= List of emperors of the Tang dynasty =

Emperor of the Tang dynasty
- 唐朝皇帝
- Imperial
- First to reign Emperor Gaozu; 618–626

Details
- Style: His Imperial Majesty (陛下); Khan of Heaven (天可汗) (Taizong → Daizong)
- First monarch: Emperor Gaozu
- Last monarch: Emperor Ai
- Formed: 618 (first establishment); 705 (restoration)
- Abolished: 690 (usurpation by Wu Zhou dynasty); 907 (final collapse)
- Residences: Taiji Palace, Chang'an; Daming Palace, Chang'an
- Appointer: Hereditary

This is a list of emperors of the Tang dynasty (618–690, 705–907) of China. Tang monarchs like Emperor Taizong of Tang were also addressed to as the Khan of Heaven (Tian Kehan) by Turkic peoples.

== List of emperors ==
The Chinese naming conventions is "Tang" (唐)+ temple name (e.g. Tang Gaozu), except for Emperors Shang and Ai, who are better known by their posthumous name.

Image	Temple name	Personal name	Reigned from	Reigned until (Note: Exact dates are extracted from the Old Book of Tang and converted to Western dates using the Calendar converter of Academia Sinica.)	Posthumous name (Note: These are just the shortened versions of the names. Gaozu's full posthumous name, for example, was actually Shényáo Dàshèng Dàguāng Xiào Huángdì (神堯大聖大光孝皇帝, "Emperor Yao the Divine, the Great Sage, the Most Radiantly Filial").)	Era name and years
	Gaozu 高祖	Li Yuan 李渊	18 June 618	4 September 626 abdicated	Emperor Shenyao 神堯皇帝	Wude (武德) 618–626
	Taizong 太宗	Li Shimin 李世民	4 September 626	10 July 649	Emperor Wenwu 文武皇帝	Zhenguan (貞觀) 627–649
	Gaozong (Note: In the late years of his reign he was influenced by Empress Wu) 高宗	Li Zhi 李治	15 July 649	27 December 683	Emperor Tianhuang 天皇大帝	Yonghui (永徽) 650–655; Xianqing (顯慶) 656–661; Longshuo (龍朔) 661–663; Linde (麟德) 664–665; Qianfeng (乾封) 666–668; Zongzhang (總章) 668–670; Xianheng (咸亨) 670–674; Shangyuan (上元) 674–676; Yifeng (儀鳳) 676–679; Tiaolu (調露) 679–680; Yonglong (永隆) 680–681; Kaiyao (開耀) 681–682; Yongchun (永淳) 682–683; Hongdao (弘道) 683
	Zhongzong (Note: Under the rule of his mother Wu Zetian) 中宗	Li Xian 李显	3 January 684	26 February 684 deposed	—	Sisheng (嗣聖) 23 January–27 February 684
	Ruizong (Note: Under the rule of his mother Wu Zetian) 睿宗	Li Dan 李旦	27 February 684	16 October 690 deposed	—	Wenming (文明) 684; Guangzhai (光宅) 684; Chuigong (垂拱) 685–688; Yongchang (永昌) 689; Zaichu (載初) 690
	Interregnum (Wu Zhou dynasty)					
	Zhongzong (second reign)	Li Xian 李显	23 February 705	3 July 710	Emperor Xiaohe 孝和皇帝	Shenlong (神龍) 705–707; Jinglong (景龍) 707–710
	none (Note: Better known for his porthumous name, Emperor Shang, or as Emperor Shao ("young").)	Li Chongmao 李重茂	5 July 710	25 July 710 (Note: Some sources give the period of his reign as 5–18 July, while others give 8–25 July.)	Emperor Shang 殤皇帝	Tanglong (唐隆) 5 July– 19 August 710
	Ruizong (second reign)	Li Dan 李旦	25 July 710	8 September 712 abdicated	Emperor Xuanzhen 玄真皇帝	Jingyun (景雲) 710–711; Taiji (太極) 712; Yanhe (延和) 712
	Xuánzong 玄宗	Li Longji 李隆基	8 September 712	12 August 756 abdicated	Emperor Zhidao I 至道皇帝	Xiantian (先天) 712–713; Kaiyuan (開元) 713–741; Tianbao (天寶) 742–756
	Suzong 肅宗	Li Heng 李亨	12 August 756	16 May 762	Emperor Wenming 文明皇帝	Zhide (至德) 756–758; Qianyuan (乾元) 758–760; Shangyuan (上元) 760–761
	Daizong 代宗	Li Yu 李豫	18 May 762	23 May 779	Emperor Ruiwen 睿文皇帝	Baoying (寶應) 762–763; Guangde (廣德) 763–764; Yongtai (永泰) 765–766; Dali (大曆 lì) 766–779
	Dezong 德宗	Li Kuo 李适	12 June 779	25 February 805	Emperor Shenwu 神武皇帝	Jianzhong (建中) 780–783; Xingyuan (興元) 784; Zhenyuan (貞元) 785–805
	Shunzong 順宗	Li Song 李誦	28 February 805	28 August 805 killed	Emperor Zhide 至德皇帝	Yongzhen (永貞) 805
	Xianzong 憲宗	Li Chu 李純	5 September 805	14 February 820 killed	Emperor Zhaowen 昭文皇帝	Yuanhe (元和) 806–820
	Muzong 穆宗	Li Heng 李恆	20 February 820	25 February 824	Emperor Ruisheng 睿聖皇帝	Changqing (長慶) 821–824
	Jingzong 敬宗	Li Zhan 李湛	29 February 824	9 January 827 killed	Emperor Ruiwu 睿武皇帝	Baoli (寶曆) 824–826
	Wenzong 文宗	Li Ang 李昂	13 January 827	10 February 840	Emperor Yuansheng 元聖皇帝	Baoli (寶曆) 826; Taihe (太和) 827–835; Kaicheng (開成) 836–840
	Wuzong 武宗	Li Yan 李炎	20 February 840	22 April 846	Emperor Zhidao II 至道皇帝	Huichang (會昌) 841–846
	Xuānzong 宣宗	Li Chen 李忱	25 April 846	7 September 859	Emperor Yuansheng 元聖皇帝	Dachong (大中) 847–859
	Yizong 懿宗	Li Cui 李漼	13 September 859	15 August 873	Emperor Zhaosheng 昭聖皇帝	Dazhong (大中) 859; Xiantong (咸通) 860–873
	Xizong 僖宗	Li Xuan 李儇	15 August 873	20 April 888	Emperor Huisheng 惠聖皇帝	Xiantong (咸通) 873–874; Qianfu (乾符) 874–879; Guangming (廣明) 880–881; Zhonghe (中和) 881–885; Guangqi (光啟) 885–888; Wende (文德) 888
	Zhaozong 昭宗	Li Ye 李曄	22 April 888	22 September 904	Emperor Shengmu 聖穆皇帝	Longji (龍紀) 889; Dashun (大順) 890–891; Jingfu (景福) 892–893; Qianning (乾寧) 894–898; Guanghua (光化) 898–901; Tianfu (天復) 901–904; Tianyou (天佑) 904
	Jingzong 景宗	Li Zhu 李柷	26 September 904	12 May 907 deposed	Emperor Ai 哀皇帝	Tianyou (天佑) 904–907

== Sources ==
- Cotterell, Arthur (2008). "Emperors and Their Reigns". The Imperial Capitals of China. New York: Overlook Press. ISBN 978-1-4683-0605-7.
- Heng, Chye Kiang (1999). "List of Selected Dynasties and Rulers". Cities of Aristocrats and Bureaucrats: The Development of Medieval Chinese Cityscapes. Singapore: Singapore University Press. ISBN 978-9971-69-223-0.
- Kroll, Paul W. (2019). "Tang Emperors' Accession Dates and Reign Titles". Critical Readings on Tang China. Vol. 1. Brill. ISBN 9789004380158.
- Twitchett, Denis (1979). "The T'ang emperors and their reign periods". The Cambridge History of China. Vol. 3. Cambridge University Press. ISBN 978-0-521-21446-9.
