= Emperor Manjushri =

Honorific title in Tibetan Buddhism

(Great) Emperor Manjushri
- འཇམ་དབྱངས་གོང་མ་ཆེན་པོ

Emperor Manjushri

The Emperor Manjushri or Great Emperor Manjushri (Tibetan: འཇམ་དབྱངས་གོང་མ་ཆེན་པོ, Wylie: ajam dbyangs gong ma chen po; Chinese: 文殊皇帝; pinyin: Wénshū Huángdì; Manchu: ᠮᠠᠨᠵᡠᠰᡳᡵᡳ
ᡥᠠᠨ, Mölendorff: Manjusiri han or Chinese: 文殊大皇帝/曼殊師利大皇帝) was an honorific title in Tibetan Buddhism given to emperors of China's Qing dynasty, notably the Qianlong Emperor.

Kublai Khan, founder of the Mongol-led Yuan dynasty, had been regarded by the Tibetan Buddhists as a reincarnation of Manjushri. The Yongle Emperor of the Ming dynasty promoted the idea that he too was the earthly manifestation of Manjushri and styled himself the wheel-turning king. The emperors of the Qing dynasty further portrayed themselves as the incarnation of Manjushri and the wheel-turning king who brings peace to the world. The title (文殊菩薩皇帝 or 文殊大皇帝) was commonly used by the Tibetans as the opening words when addressing to the Qing court during the Shunzhi period, and the Manchus referred to the Qing emperors as "Old Buddha" (佛爺).

== See also ==
- Son of Heaven
- Emperor of China
  - Ming dynasty emperors
  - Qing dynasty emperors
- Tibet under Yuan rule
- Ming–Tibet relations
- Tibet under Qing rule
- Khan of Heaven
- Bogda Khan
- Manjushri
