= List of emperors of the Jin dynasty =

List of emperors of the Jin dynasty may refer to:

- Emperors of the Western and Eastern Jin dynasties (晉朝/晋朝, Jìn Cháo; 3rd–5th century)
- Emperors of the Later Jin (後晉/后晋, Hòujìn; 10th century)
- Emperors of the Jurchen Jin dynasty (金朝, Jīn Cháo; 12th–13th century)
- Emperors of the Qing dynasty, founded by Nurachi as the Later Jin (後金/后金, Hòujīn; 17th century)
