= List of emperors of the Qing dynasty =

Emperor of the Great Qing
- 大清皇帝
- Imperial
- Standard of the Qing Emperor

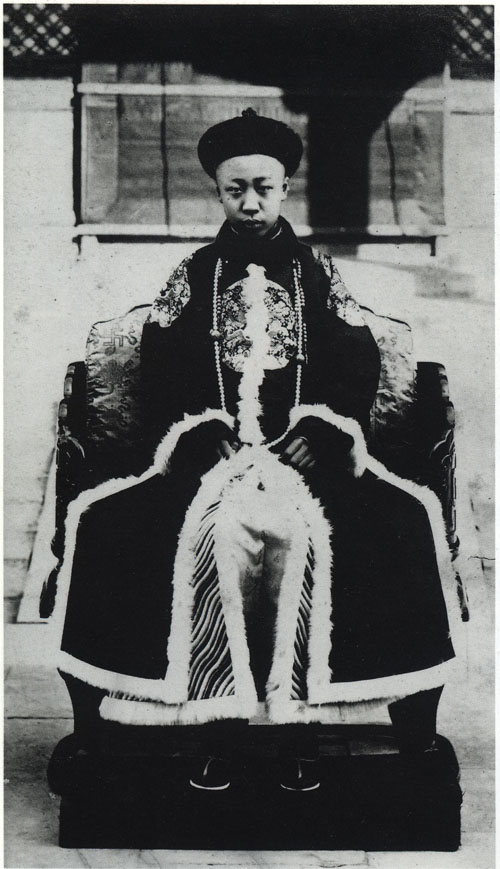
- Last to reign Xuantong Emperor; 2 December 1908 – 12 February 1912

Details
- Style: His Imperial Majesty (陛下); Bogda Khan (博格達汗); Emperor Manjushri (文殊皇帝)
- First monarch: Chongde Emperor
- Last monarch: Xuantong Emperor
- Formed: 1636
- Abolished: 12 February 1912
- Residences: Mukden Palace; Forbidden City, Beijing

The Qing dynasty (1644–1912) was a Manchu-led imperial Chinese dynasty and the last imperial dynasty of China. It was officially proclaimed in 1636 in Shenyang in what is now Northeast China, but only captured Beijing and succeeded the Ming dynasty in China proper in 1644. The Qing dynasty collapsed when the imperial clan (surnamed Aisin Gioro) abdicated in February 1912, a few months after a military uprising had started the Xinhai Revolution that led to the foundation of the Republic of China.

Nurhaci (1559–1626), khan of the Jurchens, founded the Later Jin dynasty in 1616 in reference to the Jurchen-led Jin dynasty (1115–1234) that had once ruled over northern China. His son and successor Hong Taiji (1592–1643) renamed his people "Manchu" in 1635 and changed the name of Nurhaci's state from "Great Jin" to "Great Qing" in 1636. Hong Taiji was the real founder of Qing imperial institutions. He was the first to adopt the title of "emperor" (huangdi) and founded an Imperial Ancestral Temple in the Qing capital Mukden in 1636. After the Qing captured Beijing in 1644 and appropriated the Ming Ancestral Temple, from 1648 on, Nurhaci was worshiped there as "Taizu" (太祖), a temple name usually accorded to dynastic founders. Qing emperors since Hong Taiji were also referred to as Bogda Khan by the Mongol subjects, and as "Chinese khagan" by their Turkic Muslim subjects when Qing rule extended to Xinjiang in the 18th century.

Like their Ming (1368–1644) predecessors—but unlike the emperors of earlier dynasties like the Han, Tang, and Song—Qing emperors used only one era name ("Shunzhi", "Qianlong", "Guangxu", etc.) for their entire reign, and are most commonly known by that name. Starting with Nurhaci, there were twelve Qing rulers. Following the capture of Beijing and re-enthronement as Emperor of China in 1644, the Shunzhi Emperor (r. 1643/4–1661) became the first of the ten Qing sovereigns to rule over China proper. At 61 years, the reign of the Kangxi Emperor (r. 1661–1722) was the longest, though his grandson, the Qianlong Emperor (r. 1735–1796), would have reigned even longer if he had not purposely ceded the throne to the Jiaqing Emperor (r. 1796–1820) in order not to reign longer than his grandfather. Qing emperors succeeded each other from father to son until the Tongzhi Emperor (r. 1861–1875), the 11th Qing ruler, died childless in 1875. The last two emperors were chosen by Empress Dowager Cixi from other branches of the imperial clan.

== Succession ==
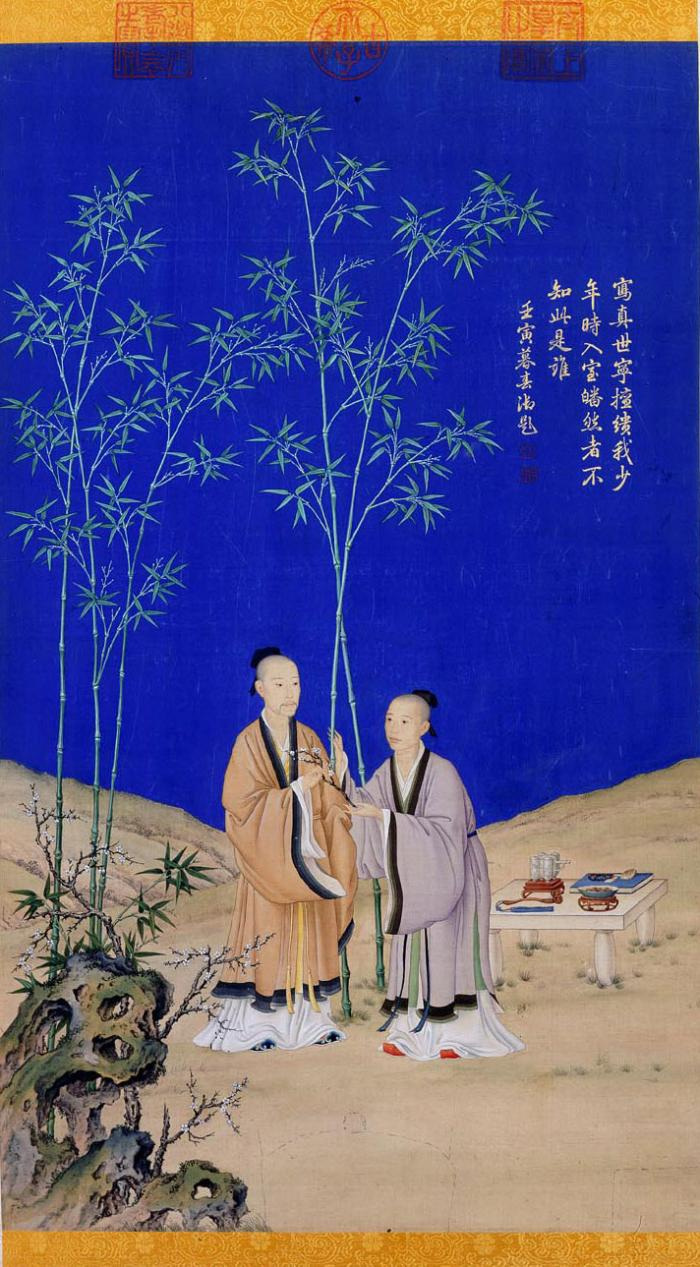
"Spring's Peaceful Message", by Giuseppe Castiglione, represents the passing of the throne from the Yongzheng Emperor (left) to his son Hongli (right), the future Qianlong Emperor. Hongli was the first Qing monarch to be chosen through the secret system that his father instated to prevent struggles over succession.

Unlike the Ming emperors, who named their eldest legitimate son heir apparent whenever possible and forbade other sons from participating in politics, the Qing monarchs did not choose their successors according to primogeniture. When in 1622 Nurhaci (1559–1626) was asked which one of his sons he had chosen to succeed him as khan of the Jurchens, he refused to answer, telling his sons that they should determine after his death who among them was the most qualified leader. His answer reflected the fact that in Jurchen society, succession as tribal chieftain was usually determined by merit, not descent. When Nurhaci died in 1626, a committee of Manchu princes selected Hong Taiji (1592–1643) as his successor. Hong Taiji's death in 1643 caused another succession crisis, because many of Nurhaci's other sons appeared to be qualified leaders. As a compromise, the Manchu princes chose Hong Taiji's four-year-old son Fulin (the Shunzhi Emperor, r. 1643–1661) as his successor, marking the adoption of father-son succession in the Qing imperial line.

The Shunzhi Emperor, who died of smallpox in 1661, chose his third son Xuanye as successor because he had survived smallpox. That child reigned as the Kangxi Emperor (r. 1661–1722), who for the first time in Qing history followed the Chinese habit of primogeniture and appointed his eldest son Yinreng (1674–1725) as heir apparent. The heir apparent was removed twice because of his extravagance and abhorrent behavior, which included an attempt to assassinate the emperor. After Yinreng was demoted for good in 1712, the emperor refused to name an heir. Because Qing policy forced imperial princes to reside in the capital Beijing, many princes became involved in politics, and the Kangxi succession became particularly contested. After the Kangxi Emperor's death in 1722, his fourth son Yinzhen (1678–1735) emerged as victor and reigned as the Yongzheng Emperor, but his legitimacy was questioned for years after his accession.

To avoid such struggles in the future, the Yongzheng Emperor designed a system by which the living emperor would choose his successor in advance and on merit, but would keep his choice secret until his deathbed. The name of the future emperor was sealed in a casket that was hidden behind a panel in the rafters of the Qianqing Palace inside the Forbidden City. As successor, the Yongzheng Emperor chose his fourth son Hongli (1711–1799), the Qianlong Emperor, who himself selected his 15th son Yongyan, the Jiaqing Emperor (r. 1796–1820). The latter chose his successor Minning (1782–1850), the Daoguang Emperor, in 1799, but only read his testament shortly before dying.

When the Tongzhi Emperor died heirless in 1875, his mother Empress Dowager Cixi was the one who selected the next emperor. But instead of making the deceased emperor adopt an heir from the generation below himself (in this case this would have been a nephew of the Tongzhi Emperor) as the rules of imperial succession dictated, she picked one from the same generation. The new emperor was Zaitian (the Guangxu Emperor; 1871–1908), the son of Prince Chun, a half-brother of Empress Dowager Cixi's late husband, the Xianfeng Emperor (r. 1850–1861). She assured her opponents that as soon as the new emperor had a son, he would be adopted into the Tongzhi Emperor's line. However, as the Guangxu Emperor died heirless too, Empress Dowager Cixi also chose his successor, Puyi, in 1908.

== Regents and empresses dowager ==
Qing succession and inheritance policies made it difficult for empresses and their relatives to build power at court, as they had in the Han dynasty for example. Threats to imperial power usually came from within the imperial clan. When the young Fulin was chosen to succeed his father Hong Taiji in September 1643, two "prince regents" were selected for him: Hong Taiji's half-brother Dorgon (1612–1650) and Nurhaci's nephew Jirgalang (1599–1655). Soon after the Manchus had seized Beijing under Dorgon's leadership in May 1644, Dorgon came to control all important government matters. Official documents referred to him as "Imperial Uncle Prince Regent" (Huang shufu shezheng wang 皇叔父攝政王), a title that left him one step short of claiming the throne for himself. A few days after his death, he received a temple name (Chengzong 成宗) and an honorific posthumous title (Yi Huangdi 義皇帝, "Righteous Emperor"), and his spirit tablet was placed in the Imperial Ancestral Temple next to those of Nurhaci and Hong Taiji. In early March 1651 after Dorgon's supporters had been purged from the court, these titles were abrogated.

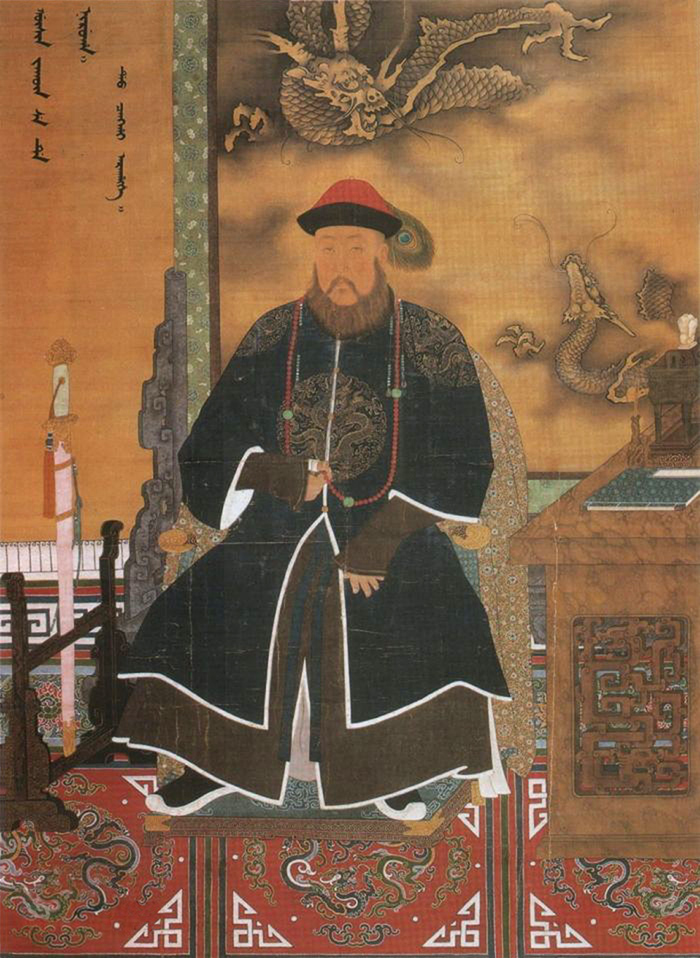
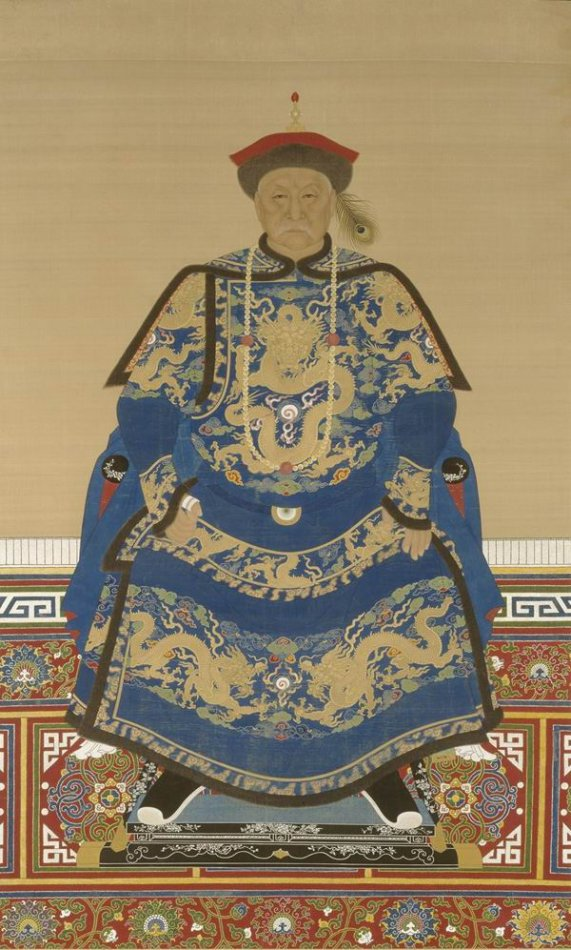
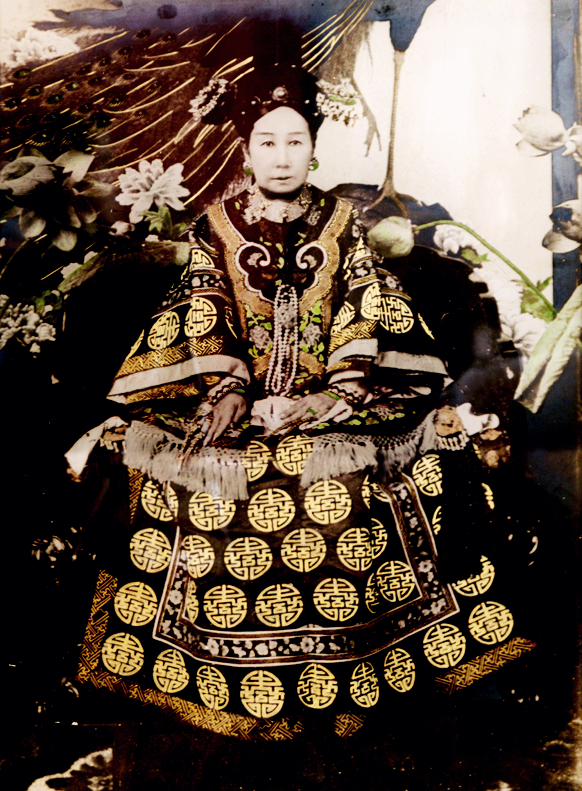
The three most powerful regents of the Qing dynasty: (from left to right) Dorgon (r. 1643–1650), Oboi (r. 1661–1669), and Empress Dowager Cixi (r. 1861–1889 and 1898–1908)

The reign of the Shunzhi Emperor ended when he died of smallpox in 1661 at the age of 22. His last will—which was tampered and perhaps even forged by its beneficiaries—appointed four co-regents for his son and successor the six-year-old Xuanye, who was to reign as the Kangxi Emperor. All four were Manchu dignitaries who had supported the Shunzhi Emperor after the death of Dorgon, but their Manchu nativist measures reversed many of the Shunzhi Emperor's own policies. The "Oboi regency", named after the most powerful of the four regents, lasted until 1669, when the Kangxi Emperor started his personal rule.

For almost 200 years, the Qing Empire was governed by adult emperors. In the last fifty years of the dynasty—from the death of the Xianfeng Emperor in 1861 to the final abdication of the child emperor Puyi in 1912—the imperial position again became vulnerable to the power of regents, empress dowagers, imperial uncles, and eunuchs. Empress Dowager Cixi (1835–1908) came to power through a coup that ousted eight regents who had been named by her husband, the Xianfeng Emperor. She controlled the government during the reigns of the Tongzhi (r. 1861–1875) and Guangxu (r. 1875–1908) emperors. From 1861 onwards, she was officially co-regent with Empress Dowager Ci'an, but her political role increased so much that within a few years she was taking charge of most government matters. She became sole regent in 1881 after the death of Empress Dowager Ci'an. With the assistance of eunuchs and Manchu princes, she remained regent until March 1889, when she finally let the Guangxu Emperor rule personally (he was then 17 years old). After she intervened to end the Hundred Days' Reform in September 1898, she had the emperor put under house arrest and held the reins of the Qing government until her death in 1908.

== Multiple appellations ==
=== Era name ===
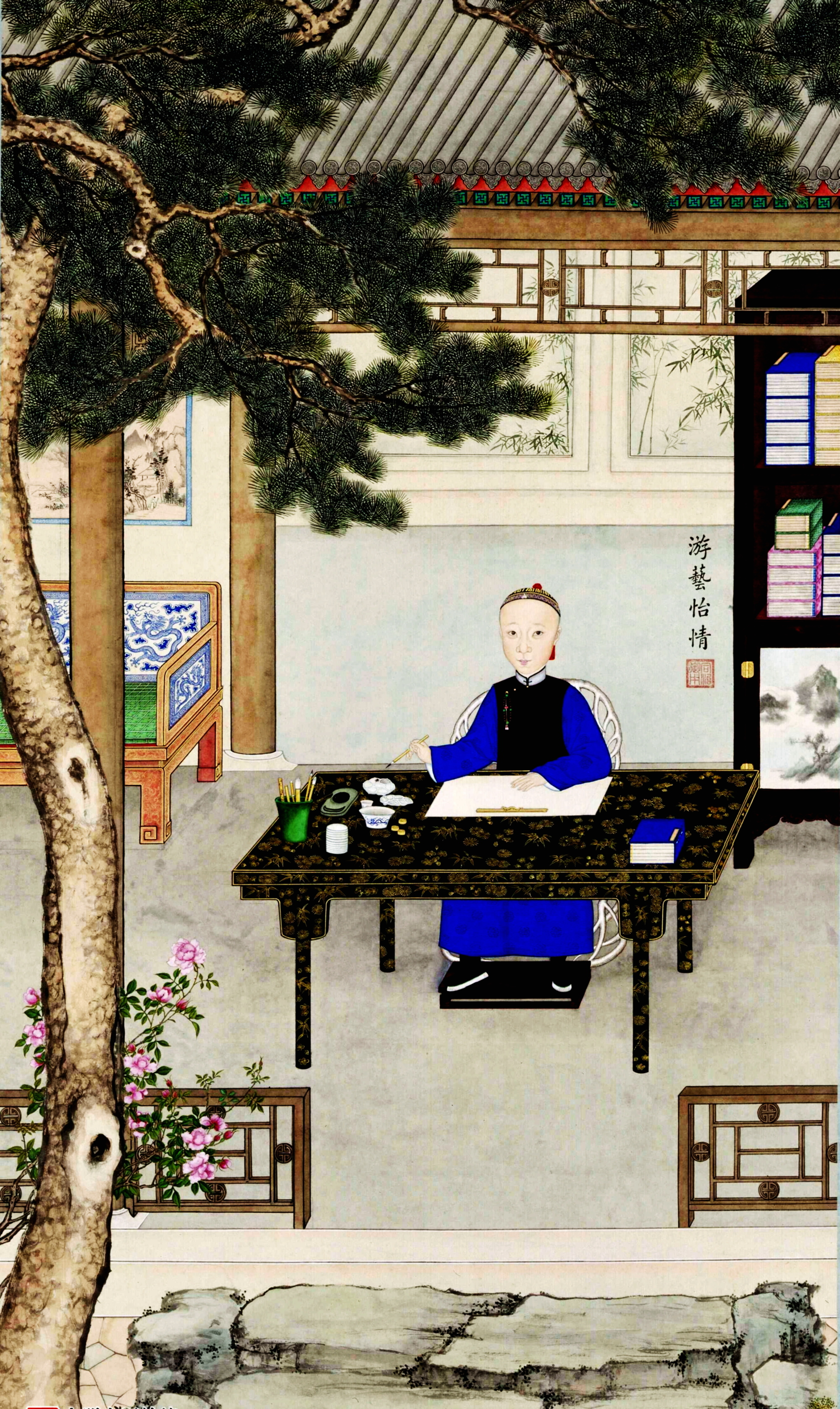
The young Zaichun ruled as the Tongzhi Emperor from 1862 until his death in 1875. The era name Tongzhi, an allusion to the Book of Documents, was chosen to reflect the new political situation after his mother Empress Dowager Cixi (1835–1908) ousted Zaichun's eight regents in a coup in November 1861.

An emperor's era name or reign name was chosen at the beginning of his reign to reflect the political concerns of the court at the time. A new era name became effective on the first day of the Chinese New Year after that emperor's accession, which fell between 21 January and 20 February (inclusively) of the Gregorian calendar. Even if an emperor died in the middle of the year, his era name was used for the rest of that year before the next era officially began.

Like the emperors of the Ming dynasty, Qing monarchs used only one reign name and are usually known by that name, as when we speak of the "Qianlong Emperor" (r. 1735–1795) or the "Guangxu Emperor" (r. 1875–1908). Strictly speaking, referring to the Qianlong Emperor simply as "Qianlong" is wrong, because "Qianlong" was not that emperor's own name but that of his reign era. For the sake of convenience, however, many historians still choose to call him Qianlong (though not "Emperor Qianlong"). The only Qing emperors who are not commonly known by their reign name are the first two: Nurhaci (r. 1616–1626), who is known by his personal name, and his son and successor Hong Taiji (r. 1626–1643), whose name was a title meaning "prince Hong". Hong Taiji was the only Qing emperor to use two era names (see table).

Reign names are usually left untranslated, but some scholars occasionally gloss them when they think these names have a special significance. Historian Pamela Crossley explains that Hong Taiji's first era name Tiancong 天聰 (abkai sure in Manchu) referred to a "capacity to transform" supported by Heaven, and that his second one Chongde 崇德 (wesihun erdemungge) meant the achievement of this transformation. The practice of translating reign names is not new: Jesuits who resided at the Qing court in Beijing in the 18th century translated "Yongzheng"—or its Manchu version "Hūwaliyasun tob"—as Concordia Recta.

An era name was used to record dates, usually in the format "Reign-name Xth year, Yth month, Zth day" (sometimes abridged as X/Y/Z by modern scholars). A Qing emperor's era name was also used on the coins that were cast during his reign. Unlike in the Ming dynasty, the characters used in Qing reign names were taboo, that is, the characters contained in it could no longer be used in writing throughout the empire.

=== Personal name ===
As in previous dynasties, the emperor's personal name became taboo after his accession. The use of xuan 玄 ("mysterious", "profound") in the Kangxi Emperor's personal name Xuanye (玄燁), for example, forced printers of Buddhist and Daoist books to replace this very common character with yuan 元 in all their books. Even the Daodejing, a Daoist classic, and the Thousand Character Classic, a widely used primer, had to be reprinted with yuan instead of xuan. When the Yongzheng Emperor, whose generation was the first in which all imperial sons shared a generational character as in Chinese clans, acceded the throne, he made all his brothers change the first character of their name from "Yin" (胤) to "Yun" (允) to respect the taboo. Citing fraternal solidarity, his successor, the Qianlong Emperor, simply removed one stroke from his own name and let his brothers keep their own.

Later emperors found other ways to diminish the inconvenience of naming taboos. The Jiaqing Emperor (r. 1796–1820), whose personal name was Yongyan (永琰), replaced the very common first character of his personal name (yong 永, which means "forever") with an obscure one (顒) with the same pronunciation. The Daoguang Emperor (r. 1820–1850) removed the character for "continuous" (綿) from his name and decreed that his descendants should henceforth all omit one stroke from their name. In accordance with Manchu practice, Qing emperors rarely used their clan name Aisin Gioro.

=== Posthumous titles ===
==== Temple name ====
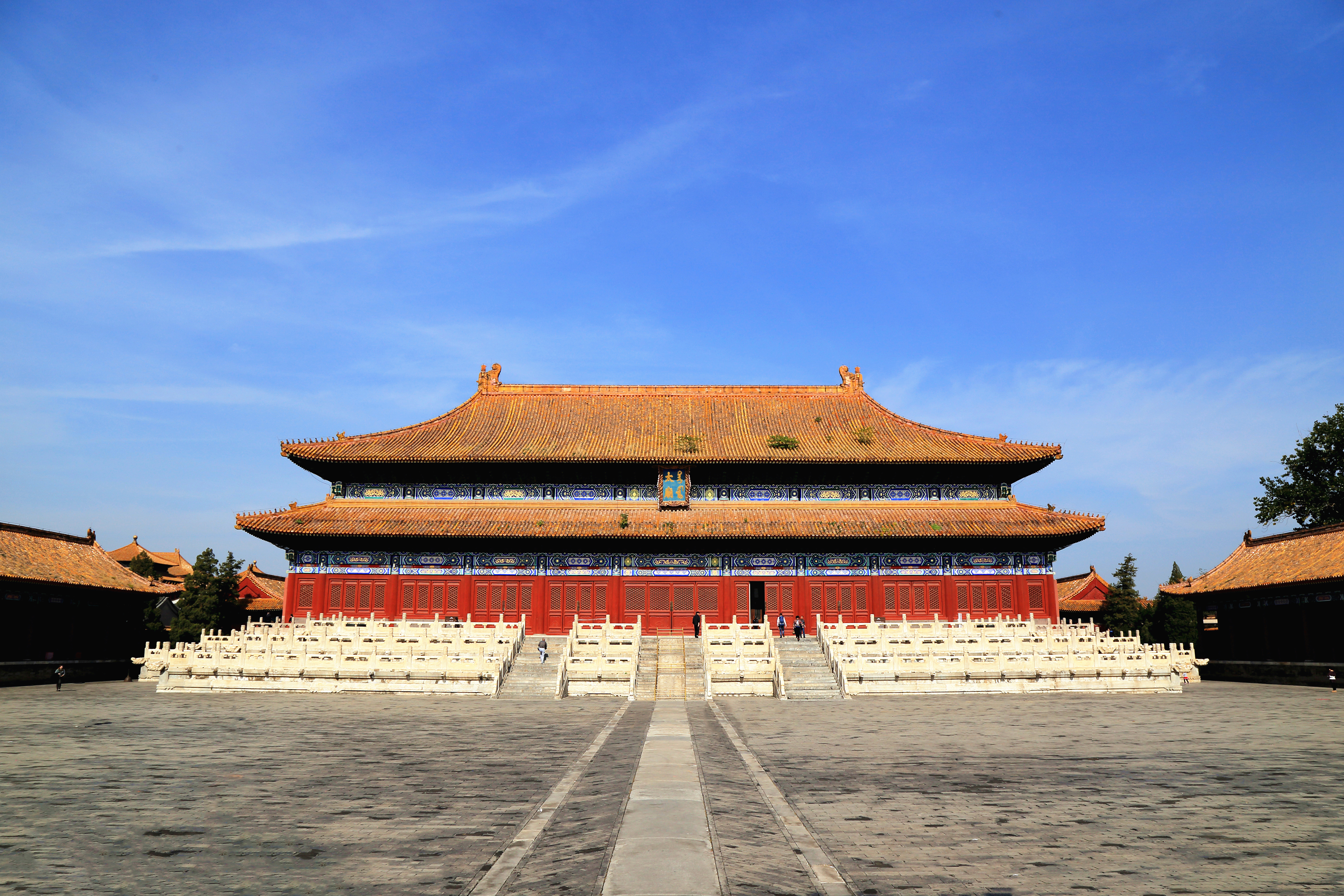
Qing emperors worshiped their ancestors' spirit tablets in the Imperial Ancestral Temple.

After their deaths, the emperors were given a temple name and an honorific name under which they would be worshiped at the Imperial Ancestral Temple. On the spirit tablets that were displayed there, the temple name was followed by the honorific name, as in "Shizu Zhang huangdi" for the Shunzhi Emperor and "Taizong Wen huangdi" for Hong Taiji. As dynastic founder, Nurhaci ("Taizu") became the focal ancestor in the main hall of the temple. The earlier paternal ancestors of the Qing imperial line were worshiped in a back hall. Historical records like the Veritable Records (traditional Chinese: 實錄; simplified Chinese: 实录; pinyin: Shílù), which were compiled at the end of each reign, retrospectively referred to emperors by their temple names.

Hong Taiji created the Qing ancestral cult in 1636 when he assumed the title of emperor. Taking the Chinese imperial cult as a model, he named his main paternal ancestors "kings" and built an Imperial Ancestral Temple in his capital Mukden to offer sacrifices to them. When the Qing took control of Beijing in 1644, Prince Regent Dorgon had the Aisin Gioro ancestral tablets installed in what had been the Ming ancestral temple. In 1648 the Qing government bestowed the title of "emperor" to these ancestors and gave them the honorific posthumous names and temple names by which they were known for the rest of the dynasty. Nurhaci was identified retrospectively as Taizu ("grand progenitor"), the usual name given to a dynasty's first emperor. This is why Nurhaci is considered as the first Qing ruler even if he was never emperor in his lifetime. Taizong was the usual name for the second emperor of a dynasty, and so Hong Taiji was canonized as Qing Taizong. The last emperor of a dynasty usually did not receive a temple name because his descendants were no longer in power when he died, and thus could not perpetuate the ancestral cult. Puyi, the last Qing monarch, reigned as the Xuantong Emperor from 1908 to 1912, but did not receive a temple name.

==== Honorific posthumous name ====
After death emperors were given an honorific posthumous title that reflected their ruling style. Nurhaci's posthumous name was originally the "Martial Emperor" (武皇帝 wǔ huángdì)—to reflect his military exploits—but in 1662 it was changed to "Highest Emperor" (高皇帝 gāo huángdì), that is, "the emperor from whom all others descend." Hong Taiji's posthumous name, the "Emperor of Letters" (M.: šu hūwangdi; Ch.: 文皇帝 wén huángdì), was chosen to reflect the way in which he metamorphosed Qing institutions during his reign.

== List of emperors ==
The emperors were usually enthroned on an auspicious day soon after the death of the previous monarch. With two exceptions (Jiaqing and Guangxu), they reigned under their predecessor's era name until the following New Year. The date that appears under "Dates of reign" indicates the first day of the lunisolar year following the death of the previous emperor, which is when the new emperor's era name came into use. The number of years indicated in the same column is the number of years in which that era name was used. Because of discrepancies between the western and the Chinese calendar, this number does not perfectly correspond to the number of years in which an emperor was on the throne.

Since posthumous titles and temple names were often shared by emperors of different dynasties, to avoid confusion they are usually preceded by the dynastic name. The Qianlong emperor, for instance, should be referred to as Qing Gaozong rather than just Gaozong. Because each emperor's posthumous name was extremely long—that of the Shunzhi Emperor, for instance, was "Titian longyun dingtong jianji yingrui qinwen xianwu dade honggong zhiren chunxiao Zhang huangdi" 體天隆運定統建極英睿欽文顯武大德弘功至仁純孝章皇帝—the table only shows the short form.

Khans of the Jin
| No. | Portrait | Emperor (Lifespan) | Reign | | Names | | | Succession | Notes |
| No. | Portrait | Emperor (Lifespan) | Reign | | Era | Post. | Temple | Succession | Notes |
|---|---|---|---|---|---|---|---|---|---|
| 1 | | Nurhaci 努爾哈赤 (1559–1626) | 17 February 1616 | 30 September 1626 | Tianming 天命; Abkai fulingga | Gaodi 高帝; Dergi | Taizu 太祖; Taidzu | (Founder of Later Jin) | Tianming was not used as an era name during Nurhaci's lifetime. His posthumous name was originally Wudi (武帝, Manchu: Horonggo), but this was changed to Gaodi in 1662. |
| 1 | | Nurhaci 努爾哈赤 (1559–1626) | 10 years and 226 days | | Tianming 天命; Abkai fulingga | Gaodi 高帝; Dergi | Taizu 太祖; Taidzu | (Founder of Later Jin) | Tianming was not used as an era name during Nurhaci's lifetime. His posthumous name was originally Wudi (武帝, Manchu: Horonggo), but this was changed to Gaodi in 1662. |
| 2 | | Hong Taiji 皇太極 (1592–1643) | 20 October 1626 | 15 May 1636 | Tiancong 天聰; Abkai sure | | | Son of Nurhaci | "Hong Taiji" means "Prince Hong" and was probably a title, not a name. In some Western historical studies, 'Hong Taiji' is erroneously called Abahai. |
| 2 | | Hong Taiji 皇太極 (1592–1643) | 9 years and 111 days | | Tiancong 天聰; Abkai sure | | | Son of Nurhaci | "Hong Taiji" means "Prince Hong" and was probably a title, not a name. In some Western historical studies, 'Hong Taiji' is erroneously called Abahai. |

Emperors of the Qing
| No. | Portrait | Emperor (Lifespan) | Reign | | Names | | | | Succession | Notes |
| No. | Portrait | Emperor (Lifespan) | Reign | | Personal | Era | Post. | Temple | Succession | Notes |
|---|---|---|---|---|---|---|---|---|---|---|
| 1 | | Hong Taiji 皇太极 (1592–1643) | 15 May 1636 | 21 September 1643 | | Chongde 崇德; Wesihun erdemungge | Wendi 文帝; Genggiyen su | Taizong 太宗; Taidzung | (Founder of Qing) | Hong Taiji declared a change of era name from Tiancong to Chongde in May 1636 when he declared himself Emperor of the newly renamed Qing dynasty. |
| 1 | | Hong Taiji 皇太极 (1592–1643) | 7 years and 227 days | | | Chongde 崇德; Wesihun erdemungge | Wendi 文帝; Genggiyen su | Taizong 太宗; Taidzung | (Founder of Qing) | Hong Taiji declared a change of era name from Tiancong to Chongde in May 1636 when he declared himself Emperor of the newly renamed Qing dynasty. |
| 2 | | Shunzhi Emperor 順治帝 (1638–1661) | 30 October 1644 | 5 February 1661 | Fulin 福臨; Fulin | Shunzhi 順治; Ijishūn dasan | Zhangdi 章帝; Eldembuhe | Shizu 世祖; Šidzu | Son of Hong Taiji | From 1643 to 1650, de facto political power was under Dorgon, the Prince Regent. The Shunzhi Emperor started his personal rule in 1651. |
| 2 | | Shunzhi Emperor 順治帝 (1638–1661) | 17 years and 121 days | | Fulin 福臨; Fulin | Shunzhi 順治; Ijishūn dasan | Zhangdi 章帝; Eldembuhe | Shizu 世祖; Šidzu | Son of Hong Taiji | From 1643 to 1650, de facto political power was under Dorgon, the Prince Regent. The Shunzhi Emperor started his personal rule in 1651. |
| 3 | | Kangxi Emperor 康熙帝 (1654–1722) | 5 February 1661 | 20 December 1722 | Xuanye 玄燁; Hiowan yei | Kangxi 康熙; Elhe taifin | Rendi 仁帝; Gosin | Shengzu 聖祖; Šengdzu | Son of Shunzhi | From 1662 to 1669, political power lay in the hands of four regents, the most powerful of which was Oboi. |
| 3 | | Kangxi Emperor 康熙帝 (1654–1722) | 61 years and 319 days | | Xuanye 玄燁; Hiowan yei | Kangxi 康熙; Elhe taifin | Rendi 仁帝; Gosin | Shengzu 聖祖; Šengdzu | Son of Shunzhi | From 1662 to 1669, political power lay in the hands of four regents, the most powerful of which was Oboi. |
| 4 | | Yongzheng Emperor 雍正帝 (1678–1735) | 27 December 1722 | 8 October 1735 | Yinzhen 胤禛; In jen | Yongzheng 雍正; Hūwaliyasun tob | Xiandi 憲帝; Temgetulehe | Shizong 世宗; Šidzung | Son of Kangxi | |
| 4 | | Yongzheng Emperor 雍正帝 (1678–1735) | 12 years and 286 days | | Yinzhen 胤禛; In jen | Yongzheng 雍正; Hūwaliyasun tob | Xiandi 憲帝; Temgetulehe | Shizong 世宗; Šidzung | Son of Kangxi | |
| 5 | | Qianlong Emperor 乾隆帝 (1711–1799) | 18 October 1735 | 9 February 1796 | Hongli 弘曆; Hung li | Qianlong 乾隆; Abkai wehiyehe | Chundi 純帝; Yongkiyaha hūwangdi | Gaozong 高宗; G'aodzung | Son of Yongzheng | In an act of filial piety to ensure that he would not reign longer than his grandfather, the Qianlong Emperor retired on 8 February 1796, the last day of that year in the Chinese calendar and took the title Emperor Emeritus (太上皇; Tàishàng Huáng'). However, de facto power remained under his control until his death in 1799. |
| 5 | | Qianlong Emperor 乾隆帝 (1711–1799) | 60 years and 115 days | | Hongli 弘曆; Hung li | Qianlong 乾隆; Abkai wehiyehe | Chundi 純帝; Yongkiyaha hūwangdi | Gaozong 高宗; G'aodzung | Son of Yongzheng | In an act of filial piety to ensure that he would not reign longer than his grandfather, the Qianlong Emperor retired on 8 February 1796, the last day of that year in the Chinese calendar and took the title Emperor Emeritus (太上皇; Tàishàng Huáng'). However, de facto power remained under his control until his death in 1799. |
| 6 | | Jiaqing Emperor 嘉慶帝 (1760–1820) | 9 February 1796 | 2 September 1820 | Yongyan 顒琰; Yong yan | Jiaqing 嘉慶; Saicungga fengšen | Ruidi 睿帝; Sunggiyen | Renzong 仁宗; Žindzung | Son of Qianlong | The first day of the Jiaqing era was also the first day of this emperor's reign, because his father retired on the last day of the previous year. Jiaqing did not hold de facto power until Qianlong's death in 1799. His personal name before his enthronement was Yongyan (永琰), but the first character was altered to the nearly homophonous 顒; yóng, as a naming taboo on the common character 永; yǒng; 'forever' was considered inconvenient. |
| 6 | | Jiaqing Emperor 嘉慶帝 (1760–1820) | 24 years and 207 days | | Yongyan 顒琰; Yong yan | Jiaqing 嘉慶; Saicungga fengšen | Ruidi 睿帝; Sunggiyen | Renzong 仁宗; Žindzung | Son of Qianlong | The first day of the Jiaqing era was also the first day of this emperor's reign, because his father retired on the last day of the previous year. Jiaqing did not hold de facto power until Qianlong's death in 1799. His personal name before his enthronement was Yongyan (永琰), but the first character was altered to the nearly homophonous 顒; yóng, as a naming taboo on the common character 永; yǒng; 'forever' was considered inconvenient. |
| 7 | | Daoguang Emperor 道光帝 (1782–1850) | 3 October 1820 | 26 February 1850 | Minning 旻寧; Min ning | Daoguang 道光; Doro eldengge | Chengdi 成帝; Šanggan | Xuanzong 宣宗; Siowandzung | Son of Jiaqing | His name had been Mianning (Chinese: 綿寧), but he changed it to Minning when he acceded the throne because a naming taboo on the common character Mian (Chinese: 綿; lit. 'cotton') would have been too inconvenient. |
| 7 | | Daoguang Emperor 道光帝 (1782–1850) | 29 years and 147 days | | Minning 旻寧; Min ning | Daoguang 道光; Doro eldengge | Chengdi 成帝; Šanggan | Xuanzong 宣宗; Siowandzung | Son of Jiaqing | His name had been Mianning (Chinese: 綿寧), but he changed it to Minning when he acceded the throne because a naming taboo on the common character Mian (Chinese: 綿; lit. 'cotton') would have been too inconvenient. |
| 8 | | Xianfeng Emperor 咸豐帝 (1831–1861) | 9 March 1850 | 22 August 1861 | Yizhu 奕詝; I ju | Xianfeng 咸豐; Gubci elgiyengge | Xiandi 顯帝; Iletu | Wenzong 文宗; Wendzung | Son of Daoguang | |
| 8 | | Xianfeng Emperor 咸豐帝 (1831–1861) | 11 years and 167 days | | Yizhu 奕詝; I ju | Xianfeng 咸豐; Gubci elgiyengge | Xiandi 顯帝; Iletu | Wenzong 文宗; Wendzung | Son of Daoguang | |
| 9 | | Tongzhi Emperor 同治帝 (1856–1875) | 11 November 1861 | 12 January 1875 | Zaichun 載淳; Dzai šun | Tongzhi 同治; Yooningga dasan | Yidi 毅帝; Filingga | Muzong 穆宗; Mudzung | Son of Xianfeng | Court officials initially chose to use the reign name Qixiang (Chinese: 祺祥), but they changed their minds and settled on Tongzhi before the beginning of the following New Year, so Qixiang was never used. |
| 9 | | Tongzhi Emperor 同治帝 (1856–1875) | 13 years and 63 days | | Zaichun 載淳; Dzai šun | Tongzhi 同治; Yooningga dasan | Yidi 毅帝; Filingga | Muzong 穆宗; Mudzung | Son of Xianfeng | Court officials initially chose to use the reign name Qixiang (Chinese: 祺祥), but they changed their minds and settled on Tongzhi before the beginning of the following New Year, so Qixiang was never used. |
| 10 | | Guangxu Emperor 光緒帝 (1871–1908) | 25 February 1875 | 14 November 1908 | Zaitian 載湉; Dzai tiyan | Guangxu 光緒; Badarangga doro | Jingdi 景帝; Ambalinggū | Dezong 德宗; Dedzung | Cousin of Tongzhi | |
| 10 | | Guangxu Emperor 光緒帝 (1871–1908) | 33 years and 264 days | | Zaitian 載湉; Dzai tiyan | Guangxu 光緒; Badarangga doro | Jingdi 景帝; Ambalinggū | Dezong 德宗; Dedzung | Cousin of Tongzhi | |
| 11 | | Xuantong Emperor 宣統帝 (1906–1967) | 2 December 1908 | 12 February 1912 | Puyi 溥儀; Pu I | Xuantong 宣統; Gehungge yoso | Mindi 愍帝 | Gongzong 恭宗 | Nephew of Guangxu | The Articles of Favourable Treatment of the Great Qing Emperor after His Abdication signed by Puyi's aunt Empress Dowager Longyu, Yuan Shikai, and the provisional government of the Republic of China in Nanking allowed Puyi to retain his title of emperor, until the "Amendment of Preferential Treatment Conditions" rescinded the title in 1924. He was temporarily restored as ruling emperor for part of July 1917. |
| 11 | | Xuantong Emperor 宣統帝 (1906–1967) | 1 July 1917 | 12 July 1917 | Puyi 溥儀; Pu I | Xuantong 宣統; Gehungge yoso | Mindi 愍帝 | Gongzong 恭宗 | Nephew of Guangxu | The Articles of Favourable Treatment of the Great Qing Emperor after His Abdication signed by Puyi's aunt Empress Dowager Longyu, Yuan Shikai, and the provisional government of the Republic of China in Nanking allowed Puyi to retain his title of emperor, until the "Amendment of Preferential Treatment Conditions" rescinded the title in 1924. He was temporarily restored as ruling emperor for part of July 1917. |
| 11 | | Xuantong Emperor 宣統帝 (1906–1967) | 3 years and 73 days | | Puyi 溥儀; Pu I | Xuantong 宣統; Gehungge yoso | Mindi 愍帝 | Gongzong 恭宗 | Nephew of Guangxu | The Articles of Favourable Treatment of the Great Qing Emperor after His Abdication signed by Puyi's aunt Empress Dowager Longyu, Yuan Shikai, and the provisional government of the Republic of China in Nanking allowed Puyi to retain his title of emperor, until the "Amendment of Preferential Treatment Conditions" rescinded the title in 1924. He was temporarily restored as ruling emperor for part of July 1917. |

== Timeline ==
Legend:

- Orange denotes Jin monarchs
- Pink denotes Qing monarchs

== See also ==
- Dynasties of China
- Qing dynasty family tree
- Son of Heaven
- Ejen
