= Celestial Empire =

Old name for China

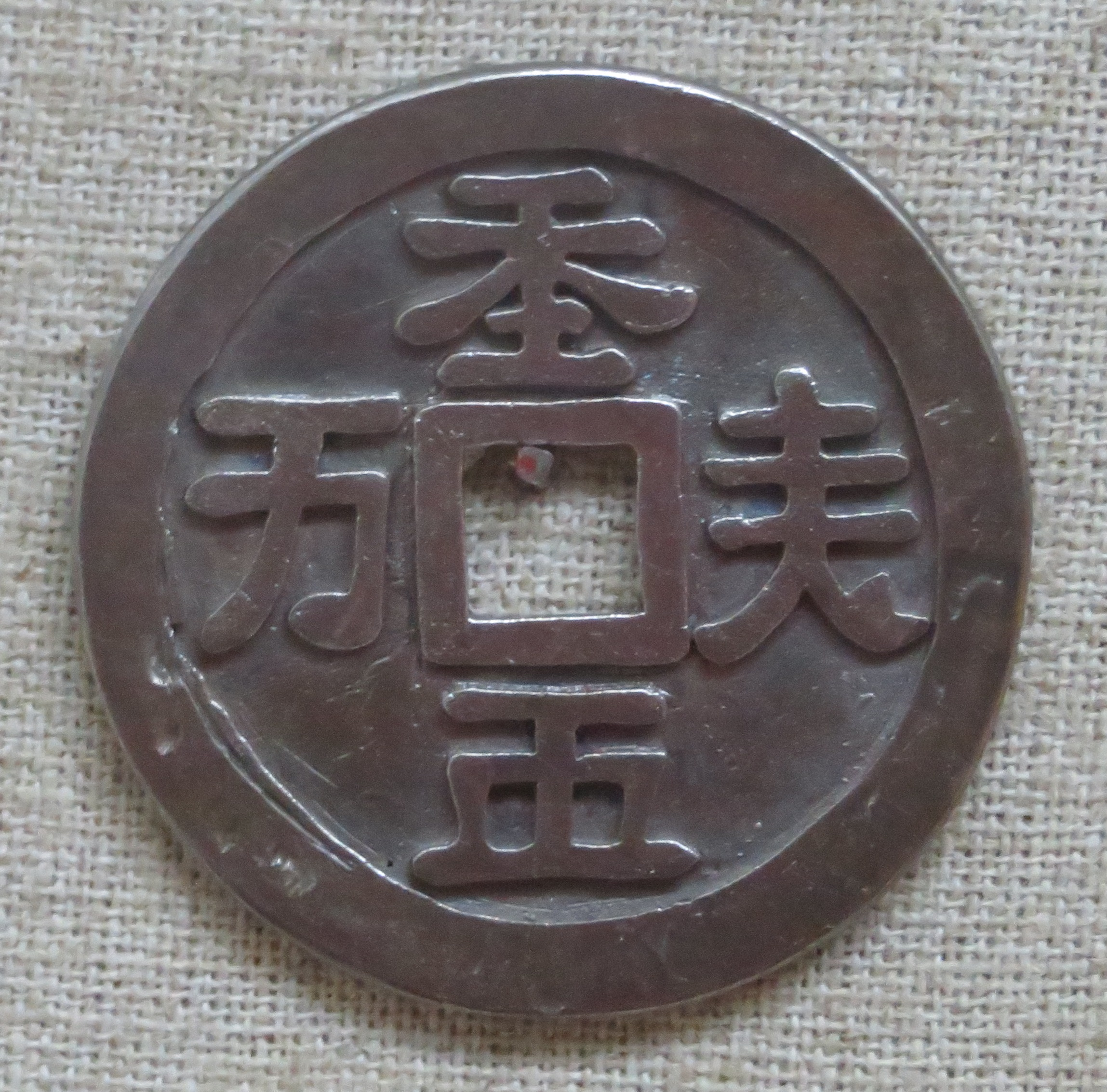
A Liao dynasty silver coin with Khitan large script characters, saying "天朝萬順"——Celestial Empire has myriad affairs successful

Celestial Empire (Chinese: 天朝; pinyin: Tiāncháo; lit. 'heavenly dynasty') is an archaic name used to refer to China or the Chinese Empire, from a literary and poetic translation of the Chinese term, one of many names for China. The name was used in reference to the status of the Emperor of China as the Son of Heaven in the Sinosphere.

Accordingly, in the 19th century, the name "Celestial" was used to refer to Chinese people. Both terms were widely used in the English-language popular mass media of the day, but fell into disuse later on. Its usage has become popular again in the present day (2015), particularly among Chinese Internet users. It is used to refer to the current Communist regime, to imply either disapproval for its political suppression and arrogance or national pride in the country's emergence as a superpower in the 21st century, depending on the context.

In modern times it has mostly fallen into disuse, but the name "Celestial Empire" still appears in various media such as articles, stories, movies and television. It is a literal translation of Tiāncháo into English as mentioned above. The origin of the name goes back to traditional Chinese religion, in which the sky is often considered the highest god, with emperors being Sons of Heaven (tianzi), born to govern the country. The emperors were also considered to be born of dragons. This was extremely significant in fostering Chinese nationalism and support for the emperor.

== Background ==
In traditional Chinese history, the Chinese ruling class tended to perceive their country as a "great central kingdom." Such trends have helped create the concept of Celestial empire, and these ideas have had a great influence on their neutralization ideas so far from generation to generation after generation. The Central Kingdom Complex was based on the understanding of China as "everything under the sky." According to Chinese studies, this concept of Chinese thought does not merely mean a glorious and powerful civilization. For them, they recognized their country as the only true civilization in all respects, including geography. Furthermore, the concept began to converge with the" noble race" to create boundaries between Chinese thought and other things. For the emperors of the central kingdom of China, the world can be roughly divided into two broad and simple categories: civilization and non-civilization, which means the people who have accepted the emperor's supremacy, the Heavenly virtue and its principle, and the people who have not accepted it.

China's neighbors were obliged to pay their respects to the 'excellent' Chinese emperors within these boundaries on a regular basis. It can be said that this was the most important element of the East Asian order, which was implicit in the name of Celestial Empire in the past. Under this order of China, the trade of goods between Empire and other dynasties took place in the form of the payment of tributes from neighboring states and the receipt of return goods from China. And this trade was sometimes more beneficial to tributaries than to China. In general, the Qing dynasty received special products from the Foreign Affairs Bureau, and the Qing dynasty received books and silk. The Chinese emperor also exercised power over the surrounding dynasty under the name of Celestial Empire.

=== Construction of Chinese nationalism ===
The sinocentric term that is ‘Celestial Empire’ had many implications for the construction of Chinese nationalism. That is, the euphemistic nature of term elevated social perception of the nation to a status of authoritative and commanding nature for citizens; thus, highlighting the terms significance in fostering Chinese nationalism during the rule of the Qing dynasty.

The presence of Western influences in China during the midst of the 19th century was noteworthy for both the formation and perception of Chinese nationalism as it eroded the traditional view of the concept of Celestial Empire; merging it with the concept of a modern statehood. The years of the mid- nineteenth century were instructive to the Celestial Empire's realization that it had lost its eminence as a prevailing world power. The defeats experienced by China within the Opium Wars (1840–1842, 1856–1860), impacted the perception of Chinese nationalism; therefore, encouraging the Qing dynasty to reconsider its nationalistic approach. Zhao Suisheng had placed an emphasis on the idea that the escalation of Chinese nationalism had an explicit correlation with the intellectual search for answers to the questions regarding China's setback due to defeat in the Opium wars. This then oversaw a complete transformation in the characterisation of the term ‘Celestial Empire’ as Chinese scholars and political leaders began to evaluate the impact of the Western world.

In 1864, prominent figures within the Qing government, including Prince Luanqi, Zhang Zhidong, Li Hongzhang, Zuo Zongtang, Zeng Guofan and Feng Guifeng launched what was known as the ‘Self-Strengthening Movement’ in order to redefine the Celestial Empire.

The Self-Strengthening Movement was then moulded through the slogans that were: “‘Learn advanced technology from the barbarians to defeat the barbarians’, ‘Self-strengthening’, as well as ‘Seek Wealth’.”

A dominant issue for the leaders of the Self-Strengthening Movement was attempting to determine the internal catalyst for the weakness of the Celestial Empire. Political leader Feng Guifeng suggested that the failure of the Celestial Empire was due to the absence of economic, political, cultural, as well as social development in China. In order to overcome the shortcomings of the Celestial Empire, Feng Guifeng prompted the insertion of Western technology to redefine Chinese nationalism. The leaders of the Self-Strengthening Movement then introduced a vital sub-movement of modernization in order to promote industry, military force, commerce, agriculture and education. This modernization measure was reflective of the strengths found within the Western world. Modern factories and schools were introduced, and Chinese students were prompted to be sent abroad to study. Western technologies were therefore introduced to China in order to redefine the Celestial Empire; therefore, uplifting Chinese nationalism.

Another component of the self-strengthening movement which was vital in redefining the Celestial empire was the application of Western training techniques to the Chinese military. The leaders of the movement appointed Foreign military officers in order train Chinese soldiers and acquaint them with Western training techniques. Military drills that were largely influenced by both Swedish and German gymnastic techniques had been integrated by the Chinese Army. Within the Xiang Army, which was commanded by Zeng Guofan, who was one of the founding leaders of the self-strengthening movement; soldiers were obligated to exercise gymnastics at least twice a day as a requirement. Li Hongzhang, another leader of the movement and the commander of the Huai Army, saw that Western military generals were hired to train Chinese soldiers to be well acquainted modern military drills and exercises.

Through the application of Western military physical exercises and techniques to improve the strength of Chinese armies, political elites and leaders of the self-strengthening movement then began to focus their attention to the promotion of Chinese people's physical strength. By promoting the physical strength of the Chinese people, the government would then be able to strengthen Chinese nationalism through this notion of ‘Celestial Empire’.

Zhang Zhidong, a significant leader of the Self-Strengthening Movement, explained the importance of enforcing Western training techniques on all Chinese civilians for the elevation of nationalism: ‘Gymnastics concerns the future of the country. If everyone is as strong as soldiers, China will be a powerful country." The introduction of Western sports and training techniques to the Chinese populace was therefore vital in the creation of a strong ‘Celestial Empire’.

The Self-Strengthening Movement served as a significant symbol to the escalation of an embryonic nationalism across China which was dedicated to reconstructing the strength of the ‘Celestial Empire’ to contest against Western powers. In the century following the introduction of the self-strengthening movement, the overarching theme of Chinese nationalism was inspired by this notion. Through the authority of this concept of embryonic nationalism, China's utilisation of advanced Western technology and skill served as a medium for the government to enhance the military power of the nation.

== History ==
China's history, which was not completely politically unified and was divided into several feudal states (the Warring States period of 476~221 BC or the Three Kingdoms period of 220~264 AD), had a great influence on the creation of the concept of Celestial Empire. Ironically, the idea of the Central Kingdom originated in the Zhou dynasty, when China had a nominal central government but was, in fact, a collection of feudal states along the Yellow River. In addition, even if China was politically unified, its territory and power declined, and during the heyday, the early days of the Han, Tang, and Qing, and the North and South Song periods, almost the smallest of the countries, during the period of the North and South Song, the territory and power declined even during the course of modern pre-modern history.

Especially during the Qing dynasty, China was ruled by the Manchurian people, a people across the border. The Manchurians sought to rule the vast Chinese territory by integrating China's traditional bureaucracy and the tribal structure of Manchuria and Mongolia. The administrative posts were open to everyone in principle, but at the top of the central bureaucracy were held by two officials whose ministries were Chinese and Manchurian. The rulers, at the same time, aimed at portraying themselves as legitimate successors following the will of heaven in the tradition of the Chinese dynasty, have developed the Chinese ideology, which serves as the basis for the Celestial Empire, not forgetting their separate ethnic identity. During the era of Celestial Empire, people were able to interact with their past by collecting calligraphy, paintings and cultural artifacts. For many, traveling to the empire was an opportunity to see various places of historical significance. Information about written traditions also greatly influenced people's lives. Young people preparing for government posts studied philosophy, history and poetry. The study of historical figures, for example, allowed candidates to reflect on past choices. Only through this tradition could they leave their own footprints in history.

By the end of the eighteenth century China's Tianxia was still safe, but it was not until the middle of the nineteenth century that China, Celestial Empire, began to realize that they were no longer the dominant forces in the world. China's defeat in the Opium War (1840–1842, 1856–1860) forced them to reassess their opponents. At this time, at the same time, Tianxia was redefined, and China's political circles and scholars began to study the outside world where they had drawn boundaries.

Since the arrival of the Western colonial power in the mid-19th century during the advent of the Celestial Empire as a modern country, sports have generally spurred and contributed to the creation of nationalism and the construction of national consciousness, which became the machine for the establishment of the Republic of China in 1912. In the turn of the 20th century, the relationship between sports and Chinese nationalism is close, and sports creates modern China in a historical context. The history of the late Qing and early republics clearly showed the close relationship between sports, nationalism and politics, reflecting the changes in Chinese society, the identity and mindset of the Chinese people. Sports had great importance not only in cultivating China's nationalism and national consciousness, but also in ultimately transforming China from heaven into a modern state. It played an important role in the strategy of restoring state power by Chinese nationalists.

=== The Qing dynasty ===
The term ‘Celestial Empire’ was officially expressed and utilized by Chinese political powers under the rule of China's last imperial dynasty, the Qing dynasty (1644–1912). The Qing dynasty exercised control over an enormous, multi-ethnic and cultural empire, which consisted of numerous ethnic groups, including the Manchus, Han Chinese, the Mongols, Uyghurs, as well as the Tibetans. Both the customs, as well as the cultural traditions of these diverse ethnic groups living under the dynasty were often assimilated into Chinese society as the dynasty expanded into new regions across China.

As the Qing rule was of predominantly Manchu descent, an ethnic minority, the notion of ‘Celestial Empire’ was familiarised in order to consolidate and affirm their power. In order to consolidate and reaffirm the legitimacy of the Manchu descended Qing, the government enforced regulations regarding hair and clothing standards in order to construct a notion of unity within the empire; becoming a part of Chinese culture. This was due to the Manchu ethnic group being viewed as foreigners to the Han Chinese ethnic groups. Under the concept of Celestial Empire, the Qing rule introduced a banner system, which was originally created as a military function, however it then became the fundamental structural framework of society under the Qing rule. This system then further allowed the Qing rule to consolidate their political power, while also becoming a staple political tool used throughout the eighteenth century to uphold the status and conceptualisation of the Celestial Empire. Chinese society under the three centuries of Qing rule oversaw a great increase in population; growing from a populace of approximately 150 million in the year 1700 to over 300 million people by the mid-19th century. The expansion of regional trade under the Qing rule saw an increase in the mass of the urban population.

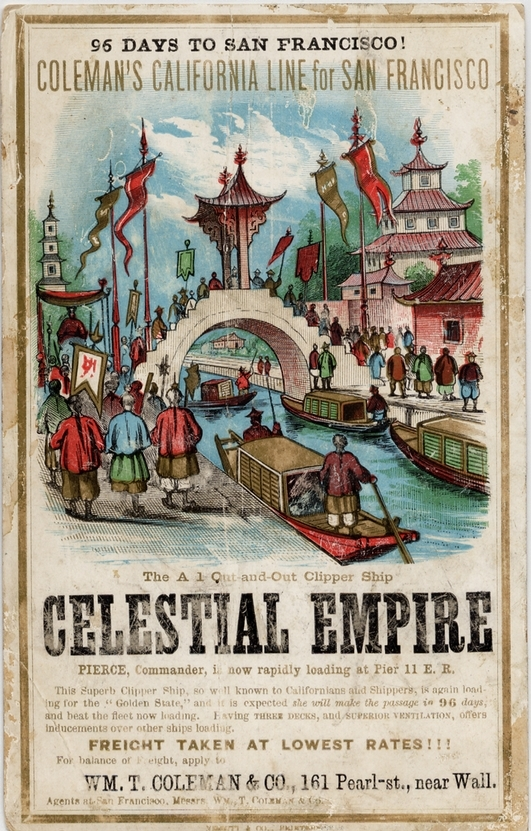
Advertisement for the American clipper ship Celestial Empire

The duration of the reign of the Qing dynasty saw the production of a multitude of different creative mediums and art forms under the concept of Celestial Empire. This concept saw the creative advancement of poetry and literature, calligraphy, paintings, as well as other cultural relics which assisted Chinese citizens living under the Qing dynasty to engage with their countries history and culture. The production of these different creative mediums offered those who travelled around the empire, an opportunity to appreciate Chinese sites of historical significance celebrated in literature produced through the Celestial empire.

== Celestial Land System ==
The term "Celestial Land System" (天朝田畝制度) means a series of systems covering land, politics, society, and military as a whole (1853) announced by the Celestial empire, Taiping Heavenly Kingdom after occupying Nanjing and setting up the capital here. The system is rich in values that Chinese Celestial emperors have pursued in history.

The land system is called Cheonjojeonmu system separately, or the entire system announced by the Taiping Heavenly Kingdom in 1853 is also called Cheonjojeonmu system. The land system is represented by the Cheonjojeonmu system as mentioned earlier. The principle of this system is that all land should be divided equally as needed in accordance with the principle of gender equality. As a result, the Taiping Heavenly Kingdom completely denied the old landlord protection system, and at the same time refused to recognize the ownership of the land, it decided to distribute a certain amount of land to farmers free of charge. Such a move by the Taiping Heavenly Kingdom caused fierce opposition from the former Qing dynasty's ruling class and the landlord class, and caused the Taiping Heavenly Kingdom to retreat from its original purpose.

The social system is represented by the Yangsama system. The Yangsama system is an active reflection of the Chinese people's idea of the Zhou dynasty as the most ideal period. Twenty-five families were set up as one group and a higher group was assigned to control one group. He was responsible for various tasks such as administration, production, distribution, religion, judicial, education, reward and punishment, past examination, and recommendation. In the Yangsama system, the government marriage system, the support of the elderly, the elderly and the child widows were all defined as social and common responsibilities based on the traditional homily. It was the first attempt by the Taiping Heaven to embody the idea of Daedong, an ideal society where China's traditional great road is realized.

The military system is represented by the single system of military and agricultural rule. In wartime, it was a system that allowed soldiers to return to the peasantry, and had the advantage of very cheap defense. By completing this system as a social system, the Taiping Heavenly Kingdom tried to build an ideal society where land was shared as much as needed, the rich and the poor did not exist, and the socially disadvantaged were protected. However, due to the resistance of the vested interests, the lack of will to implement the system, and the lack of leadership, these systems gradually become distant from the original purpose of establishment. As the kingdom of Taepyeong grew further away from its original ideal, farmers withdrew their support for the kingdom, providing a decisive cause for the collapse of the kingdom.

== Cultural features ==
When one discusses China's Celestial Empire, the map produced during the Qing dynasty, which is chosen as the most representative dynasty, serves as an indicator of the understanding and order of territory. Examples of Western teaching techniques could be seen in the Qing dynasty, but this had a considerable limited impact on traditional Chinese teaching. In their maps, geographical or artificial structures and forms were expressed in pictures, which show the influence of painting techniques. Text was also an integral part of map interpretation, which remains on the map of the entire empire based on the works of Huang Qianren (黃千人, 1694–1771).

The printing culture of the Qing dynasty inherited some of the achievements made by former Celestial emperors, but the format was not the same. Some of the finest examples of Qing printing were destroyed at the beginning of the dynasty. Landscape portrayals were also their targets, with Cheng's officials able to travel to a wide range of areas while performing their duties, and to appear in historical records, taking the opportunity to visit historic sites throughout the empire represented by poetry and prose.

These exquisite print works contrast sharply with the crude examples of printing used for mass consumption. Popular religious print works can show considerable quality and elegance, while almanacs and cheap educational prints have limited and low quality.

== See also ==
- Sinocentrism
- Tributary system of China
- Chinese expansionism
- Emperor of China
- Names of China
