= Tributary system of China =

Network of loose international relations centered on China

- Traditional Chinese: 中華朝貢體系
- Simplified Chinese: 中华朝贡体系
Transcriptions
Standard Mandarin
- Hanyu Pinyin: Zhōnghuá cháogòng tǐxì
- IPA: /ʈʂʊŋˉ xwaˊ/ /ʈʂʰɑʊˊ kʊŋˋ/ /tʰiˇ ɕiˋ/

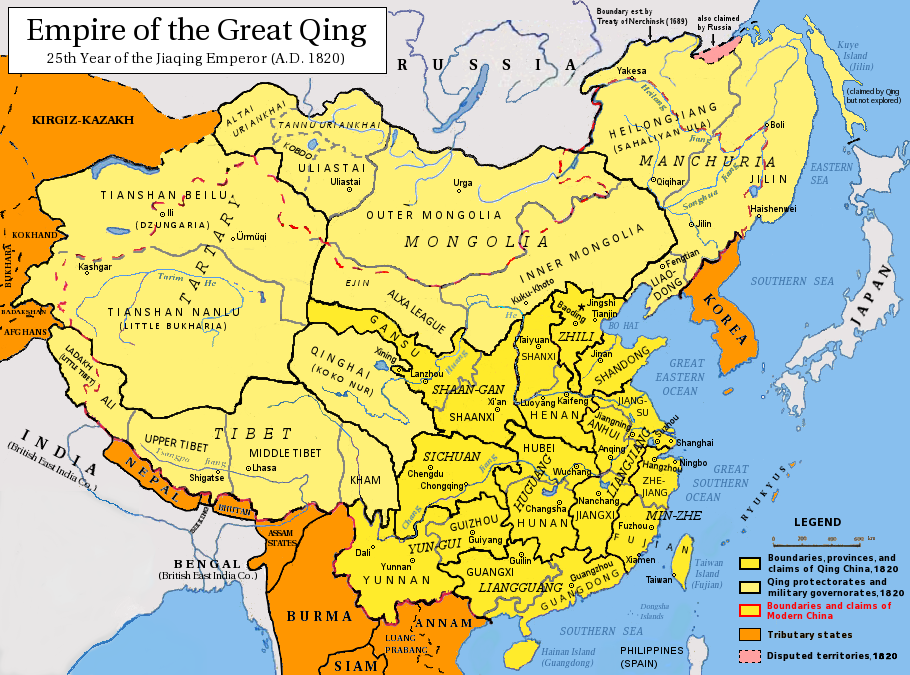
Qing China (1820) Tributary states

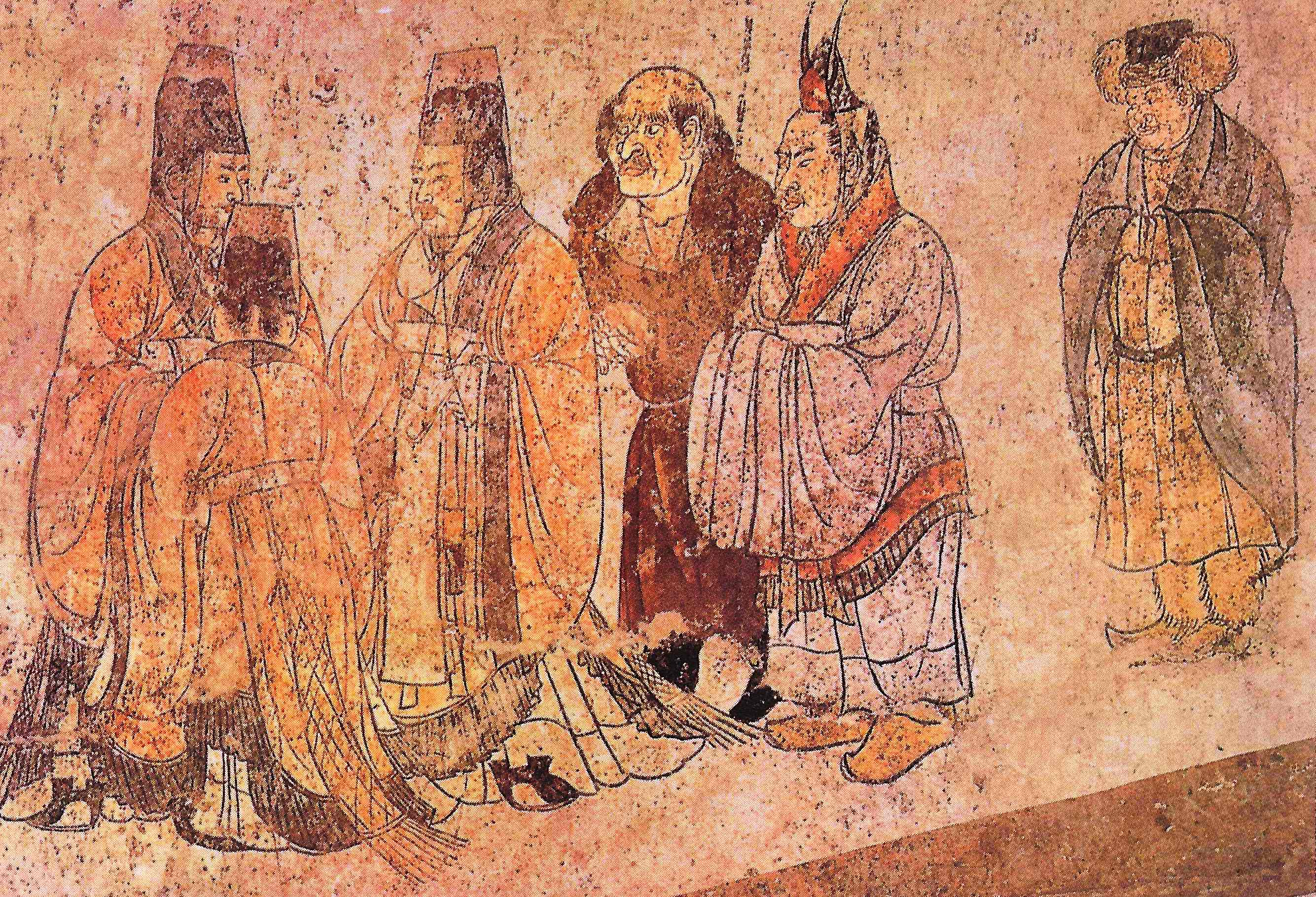
A mural from the Qianling Mausoleum in Shaanxi, 706. Foreign ambassadors are being received at court. The bald man in the middle is from the West and the man to his right is from Silla.

The tributary system of China (simplified Chinese: 中华朝贡体系; traditional Chinese: 中華朝貢體系; pinyin: Zhōnghuá cháogòng tǐxì), or Cefeng system (册封体制; 冊封體制; Cèfēng tǐzhì) at its height was a network of loose international relations centered around China which facilitated trade and foreign relations by acknowledging China's hegemonic role within a Sinocentric world order. It involved multiple relationships of trade, military force, diplomacy and ritual. The other states had to send a tributary envoy to China on schedule, who would kowtow to the Chinese emperor as a form of tribute, and acknowledge his superiority and precedence. The other countries followed China's formal ritual in order to keep the peace with the more powerful neighbor and be eligible for diplomatic or military help under certain conditions. Political actors within the tributary system were largely autonomous and in almost all cases virtually independent.

Scholars differ on the nature of China's relations with its neighbors in traditional times. Many describe a system that embodied a collection of institutions, as well as social and diplomatic conventions, that dominated China's contacts with the non-Chinese world for two millennia, until the collapse of the system around the end of the 19th century. Other scholars like Odd Arne Westad see a variety of relationships that differed in character, not an overall "tributary system". They suggest a Sinocentric system, in which Chinese culture was central to the self-identification of many elite groups in the surrounding Asian countries. By the late 19th century, China had become part of a European-style community of sovereign states and established diplomatic relations with other countries in the world following international law. While some scholars have suggested that the tributary system is a model for understanding international relations in East Asia today, other scholars have argued that the concept is misleading about relations in both early modern times and today.

== Definition ==
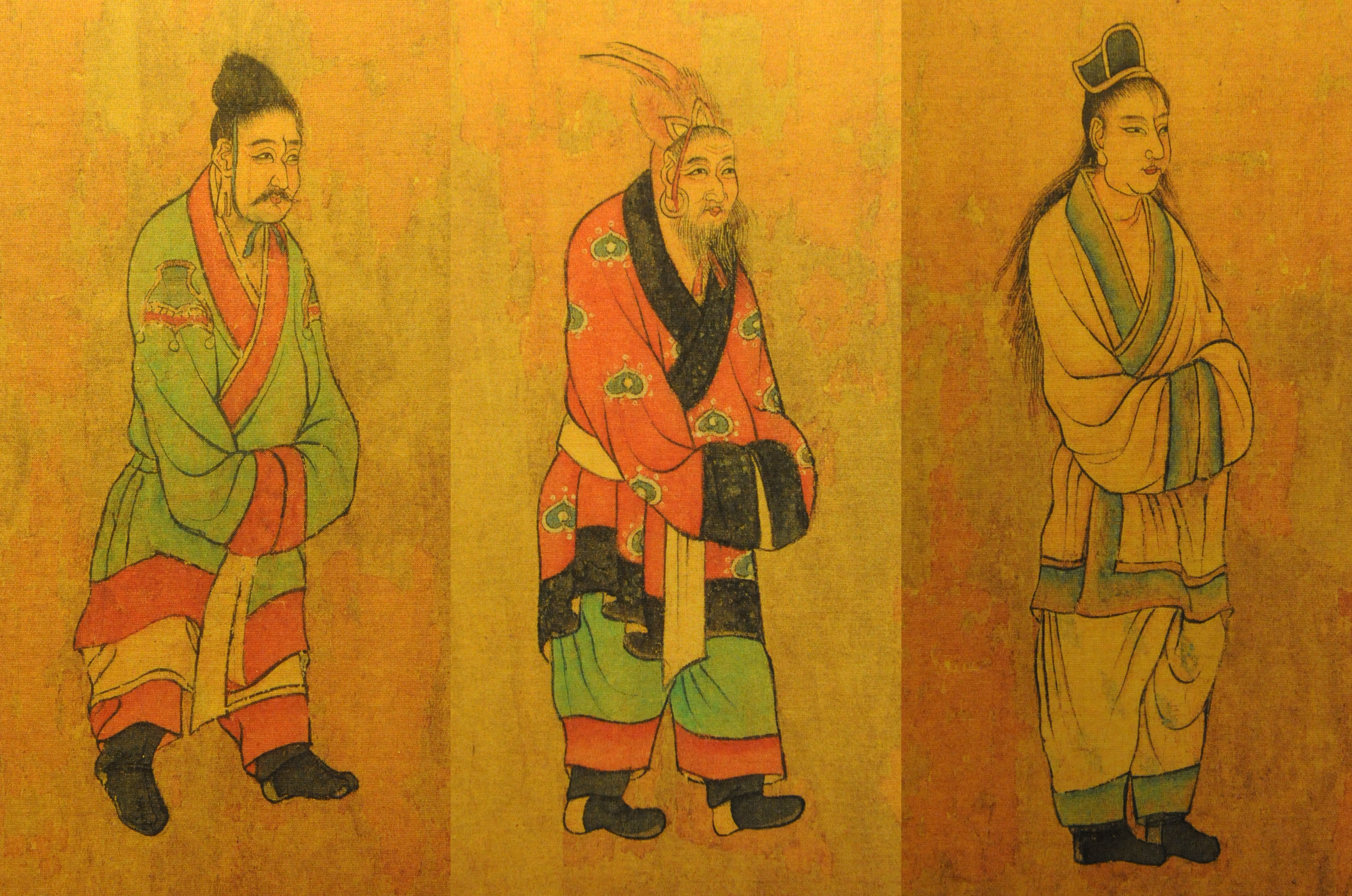
Envoys from Baekje, Goguryeo, and Silla. Painting produced 7th century AD by Yan Liben (c. 600–673)

The term "tribute system" is a Western invention. There was no equivalent term in the Chinese lexicon to describe what would be considered the "tribute system" today, nor was it envisioned as an institution or system. John King Fairbank and Teng Ssu-yu created the "tribute system" theory in a series of articles in the early 1940s to describe "a set of ideas and practices developed and perpetuated by the rulers of China over many centuries." The concept was developed and became influential after 1968, when Fairbank edited and published a conference volume, The Chinese World Order, with fourteen essays on China's pre-modern relations with Vietnam, Korea, Inner Asia and Tibet, Southeast Asia and the Ryukyus, as well as an Introduction and essays describing Chinese views of the world order. The model presents the tribute system as an extension of the hierarchic and nonegalitarian Confucian social order.

"Tribute", points out Peter C. Perdue, the historian of Qing dynasty foreign relations, is "the inadequate translation for gong, a term with multiple meanings in classical Chinese," since its "root meaning of gift giving from inferiors to superiors applied to all personal relationships...." Fairbank's concept of tribute system "turned a flexible practice with multiple meanings into an overly formalized ritual system" in which gong always had the same meanings and gong ritual was exclusively and predominately a marker of foreign relations, whereas the Qing conducted "many diverse forms of tributary ritual".

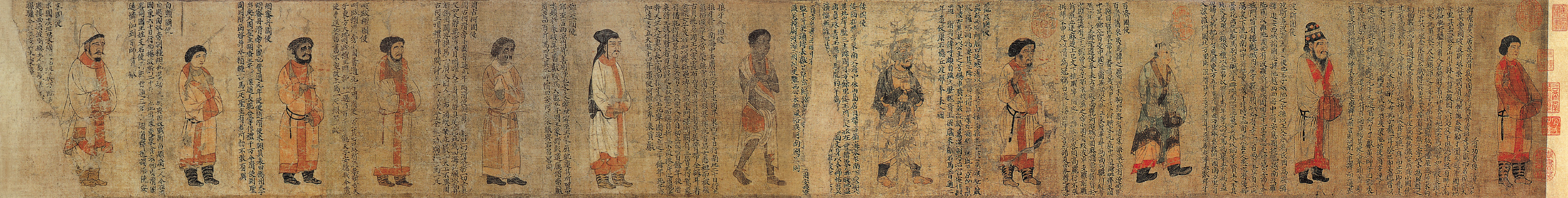
The Portraits of Periodical Offering of Liang. Song Dynasty copy of 6th-century painting in National Museum of China. Tributary envoys from right to left: Uar (Hephthalites); Persia; Baekje (Korea); Qiuci; Wo (Japan); Langkasuka (in present-day Malaysia); Dengzhi (鄧至) (Qiang) Ngawa; Zhouguke (周古柯), Hebatan (呵跋檀), Humidan (胡密丹), Baiti (白題, similar to the Hephthalite people), who dwell close to Hephthalite; Mo (Qiemo). Original attributed to Xiao Yi.

== In practice ==
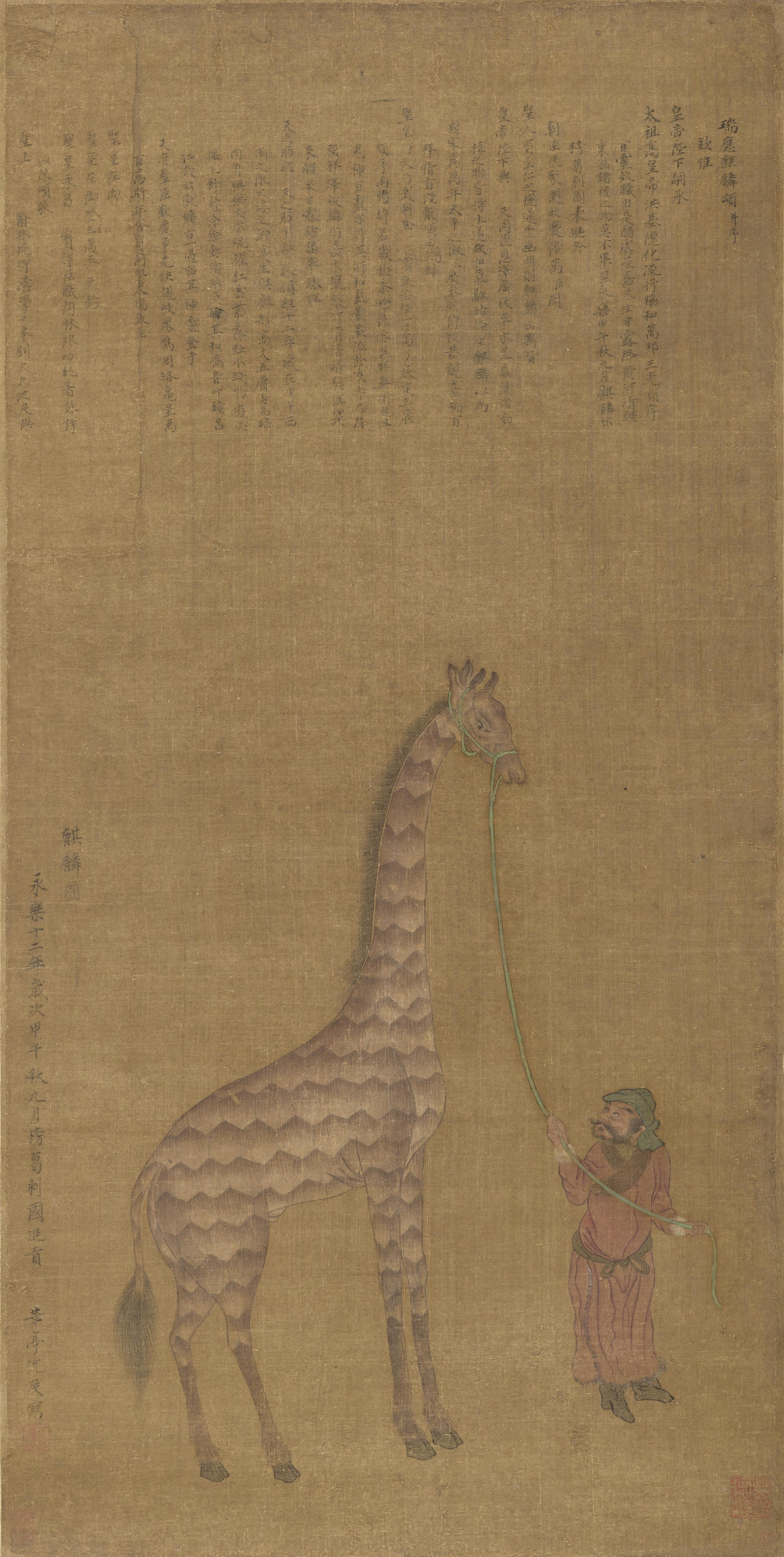
A Ming-era painting of a tribute giraffe, which was thought to be a Qilin by court officials, from Bengal

=== Legitimacy ===
The "tribute system" is often associated with a "Confucian world order", under which neighboring states complied and participated in the "tribute system" to secure guarantees of peace, investiture, and trading opportunities. One member acknowledged another's position as superior, and the superior would bestow investiture upon them in the form of a crown, official seal, and formal robes, to confirm them as king. The practice of investing non-Chinese neighbors had been practiced since ancient times as a concrete expression of the loose reign policy.

The early Ming dynasty actively sought out diplomatic relations with other states within the framework of a tributary relationship to bolster its claims to authority and superiority. In these diplomatic visits, Ming envoys would urge these states to send tributary missions to the Ming capital, asserting the Ming emperor's position as Son of Heaven above all other rulers.

The rulers of Joseon, in particular, sought to legitimize their rule through reference to Chinese symbolic authority. After the defeat of the Yuan dynasty in 1368, King Gongmin of Goryeo terminated tributary relations with the Yuan and sent tribute to the Ming. However, Goryeo also sent military forces to the Ming border region of Liaodong in 1370. After Gongmin was assassinated in 1374, his successor King U of Goryeo was dominated by a pro-Yuan court that re-established tributary relations with Northern Yuan while also sending tribute to the Ming in 1384. In 1388, Goryeo sent an army under deputy commander Yi Seong-gye to attack the Ming due to Ming demands to turn over their northeastern territory, but YI refused to carry out the invasion and instead turned back the army to remove King U from power. In 1392, Yi Seong-gye, also known as Taejo of Joseon, officially founded the state of Joseon, cut off relations with the Mongols and sent tributary envoys to the Ming founder Emperor Hongwu for recognition.

Despite Yi's willingness to become a tributary of the Ming, the Hongwu Emperor did not trust Joseon and forbade Joseon envoys from entering Ming territory by 1397. The militarist faction in Joseon planned to attack the Ming in 1398 with support from the king but their leader, Chŏng Tojŏn, was killed by one of the king's sons, Yi Pangwŏn, who later succeeded his father and became king of Joseon. He then used Neo-Confucian doctrines to solidify his rule over Joseon. Yi Seong-gye was the only king of Joseon who requested but did not receive investiture from the Ming emperor. There is no evidence that Koreans during the Ming era ever questioned the practice of sending tribute to and requesting investiture from the Ming emperor upon the enthronement of a new king. Receiving investiture from the Ming emperor was taken for granted as a source of political legitimacy for the Joseon king who was vulnerable to attacks from their subjects should he not receive recognition. Due to the Confucian outlook of contemporary Korean elites, the Ming emperor was identified as the "Son of Heaven" who embodied Confucian moral authority.

In the aftermath of the Imjin War, Seonjo of Joseon in particular sought symbolic authority from the Ming emperor due to the lack of his own political authority at home. Generals and irregular armies had formed outside of government control during the war and many had personally witnessed Seonjo fleeing from the capital upon the outbreak of the war. He downplayed the accomplishments of his own generals while attributing victory to Ming intervention. Out of fear of rebellion against his own rule, Seonjo doubled down on seeking authority from the Ming through a narrative in which he was central to the Ming's decision to send military aid against the Japanese. However most Koreans at the time understood that the Ming intervention came about from geopolitical concerns that the Japanese would have posed a threat to Ming territory if Joseon had lost the war.

On the opposite side of the tributary relationship spectrum was Japan, whose leaders could hurt their own legitimacy by identifying with Chinese authority. With the exception of Ashikaga Yoshimitsu from 1401-1408, no other modern Japanese ruler accepted official tributary status with China. As the first ruler of unified Japan during the Muromachi period, he may have sought to enhance his own status within Japan by accepting a title from the Ming to solidify his ascendance over the Japanese emperor. None of his successors adopted the same tributary relationship with China. In these politically tricky situations, sometimes a false king was set up to receive investiture for the purposes of tribute trade.

=== Autonomy ===
In practice, the tribute system only became formalized during the early years of the Ming dynasty. Actors within the "tribute system" were virtually autonomous and carried out their own agendas despite sending tribute; as was the case with Japan, Korea, Ryukyu, and Vietnam. Chinese influence on tributary states was almost always non-interventionist in nature and tributary states "normally could expect no military assistance from Chinese armies should they be invaded".

=== Tribute ===
The "tribute" entailed a foreign court sending envoys and exotic products to the Chinese emperor. Once foreign envoys reached the Chinese capital, they participated in a series of Confucian ceremonies including the kowtow. Before meeting the emperor, Chinese officials and foreign envoys gathered to practice a rehearsal ceremony. On the day of the assembly, Chinese officials and foreign envoys moved to their rehearsed positions before the emperor. An official from the Ministry of Rites led the foreign envoys to perform five bows and three sets of kneeling and bows. Afterwards, the foreign envoys would kneel before the emperor while the emperor instructed the Ministry of Rites official to provide them with drinks and meals. The emperor then gave the envoys gifts in return and permitted them to trade in China. Before departing, the envoys would perform another three sets of kneeling and bows. Presenting tribute involved theatrical subordination but usually not political subordination. The political sacrifice of participating actors was simply "symbolic obeisance". Nor were states that sent tribute forced to mimic Chinese institutions, for example in cases such as the Inner Asians, who basically ignored the trappings of Chinese government. Instead they manipulated Chinese tribute practices for their own financial benefit.

The gifts doled out by the Ming emperor and the trade permits granted were of greater value than the tribute itself, so tribute states sent as many tribute missions as they could. In 1372, the Hongwu Emperor restricted tribute missions from Joseon and six other countries to just one every three years. The Ryukyu Kingdom was not included in this list, and sent 57 tribute missions from 1372 to 1398, an average of two tribute missions per year. Since geographical density and proximity was not an issue, regions with multiple kings such as the Sultanate of Sulu benefited immensely from this exchange.

After 1435, the Ming dynasty urged foreign delegations to leave and stopped offering transport assistance for visiting missions. The size of delegations was restricted from hundreds of people to less than a dozen and the frequency of tributary missions was also reduced.

The practice of giving gifts of greater value than the tribute itself was not practiced by the Mongol-led Yuan dynasty court with Goryeo. Gifts conferred by the Yuan were worth a fraction of the tribute offered by Goryeo. Joseon paid the Qing dynasty multiple times per year and were coerced to receive hundreds of diplomatic missions, in turn granting the Qing great influence in their internal affairs, in comparison to Siam who would only send gold and silver to the Qing when requested by the court as a gift rather than a forced payment, often once every decade.

=== Culture ===
Participation in a tributary relationship with a Chinese dynasty could be predicated on cultural or civilizational motivations rather than material and monetary benefits. The Korean kingdom of Joseon did not treat the Manchu-led Qing dynasty, which invaded Joseon and forced it to become a tributary in 1636, in the same way as the Han-led Ming dynasty. Joseon continued to support the Ming in their wars against the Qing despite incurring military retaliation from the latter. The Manchus were viewed as barbarians by the Korean court, which, regarding itself as the new "Confucian ideological center" in place of the Ming, continued to use the Ming calendar and era names in defiance of the Qing, despite sending tribute missions.

According to historian Ji-Young Lee, Joseon compliance with the Ming tributary system was not merely acceptance of hegemonic practices by the most powerful state, but specifically entrenched in a Confucian worldview that was not shared with the Qing rulers, who the Koreans saw as barbarians. Lee argues that if Korean compliance with Ming hegemony was merely predicated on material interests and fear of Chinese aggression, there would have been greater acceptance of the rising Qing dynasty in the early 17th century. Instead, Joseon envoys refused to attend the Qing emperor's coronation in February 1636, resulting in their beating and imprisonment. When Na Tŏk-hyŏn was ordered by the Manchus to deliver a letter calling the Manchu ruler emperor to the Joseon king, he threw away the letter and chose not to deliver it. Subsequently, Joseon suffered two invasions by the Qing, after which it was forced to become a Qing tributary. Despite this, Joseon officials and intellectuals saw the Manchus' claim on the position of "Son of Heaven" as an attack on socially accepted norms. Joseon envoys to the Qing complained that the Manchus were no different from pigs and dogs, that the Qing emperor's head was shaven unlike previous Sons of Heaven and that the emperor forced them to meet a Tibetan priest, which the envoys described as a barbaric act that the Ming would never have subjected them to. In contrast, Joseon envoys to the Ming emperor seem to have displayed genuine fondness for the ruler. In their personal writings, Ha Gok described himself being overjoyed at seeing the emperor at a close distance, and Hong Ik-han stated that no one dared speak out of turn or make a mistake out of fear and respect. They felt disappointed when they were placed outside the Meridian Gate for the winter solstice ceremony. According to the Joseon historian Choe Bu, Joseon and the Ming were "one family".

Joseon eventually accepted Qing hegemony by sending tribute and accepting a title, but the Qing enjoyed less authority than the Ming. During the Ming dynasty, Joseon kings occasionally sent more than the necessary amount of tribute missions to "show appreciation, offer congratulations to newly enthroned emperors, pay respects to recently deceased members of the imperial family, or make special requests". These missions were voluntary and had benefits for the king's domestic political situation. Joseon kings would even turn to deceased Ming emperors and pay memorial service to them in front of a domestic audience for additional legitimacy. In contrast, Joseon missions to the Qing were kept to a minimum due to the lack of any domestic political benefit. Meanwhile Japan avoided direct contact with Qing China and instead manipulated embassies from neighboring Joseon and Ryukyu to make it falsely appear as though they came to pay tribute.

Another instance of shared cultural affiliation and attraction is Vietnam. Although tributary missions to China have been depicted in modern Vietnamese nationalist history as a cynical practice to appease China, "there is little proof of a consistent or extreme Vietnamese hatred for Chinese culture" throughout history. Instead, Vietnamese elites were generally favorable towards Chinese culture and political norms. A study of poems composed by Vietnamese envoys to China did not find any hostility held towards China but rather that they genuinely felt proud of being part of Sinic civilization. Vietnamese elites prior to French colonization were thoroughly entrenched in Chinese culture. Most Vietnamese elites up to the 19th century do not seem to have written in anything other than Classical Chinese and even criticized attempts to nativise the Chinese script to represent the Vietnamese language. Knowledge of specific Chinese texts was considered to be the equivalent of historical literacy. As late as the 20th century, important Vietnamese literature such as Ho Chi Minh's poem Vọng Nguyệt, which recites the entire history of Vietnam, was written in Classical Chinese.

Vietnamese envoys to China were heavily invested in their tradition of classical studies shared with their Chinese counterparts and sought to create a parallel Sino-Vietnamese bureaucracy in Vietnam. Similarly, Stella Xu argues that the Korean literati steeped in privilege and high culture would have felt a stronger kinship with Chinese literati than Korean peasants.

Vietnamese envoys were the primary advocates of adopting the Chinese administrative model and constantly petitioned Vietnamese emperors to implement practices they had seen at the Chinese court. Most of them were enthusiastic about visiting China and used such occasions as opportunities for sight seeing or personal exploration, sometimes to the detriment of their other tasks. In 1832, the Vietnamese emperor Minh Mạng criticized Vietnamese envoys for not bothering to describe the conditions of the people in places they had visited, and merely jotted down rough outlines of the distance between places and their names. In 1848, the Vietnamese envoy Nguyễn Siêu spent his trip to and from Beijing searching for places where the Song dynasty Neo-Confucian scholars Cheng Hao and Cheng Yi had lectured at.

In 1841, a Vietnamese envoy to the Qing court, Lý Văn Phức, found his hosts' application of the word yi (barbarian) to his lodgings, which was named "Vietnamese Barbarians' Hostel", to be objectionable. He ordered the sign be taken down, then wrote an essay in Classical Chinese emphasizing the Confucian nature of Vietnam's elite class and presented it to the Daoguang Emperor, suggesting that the Vietnamese were no more barbarian than the Manchus were. After returning to Vietnam, envoys were required to write essays on the deficiencies they had witnessed in China, possibly as a form of psychological cleansing after their trip. In 1840, one of the envoys recounted how the Qing emperor spoke different languages depending on who they were conversing with. If the person was Chinese, they spoke in Chinese, and if the person was Manchu, they spoke in Manchu. The Vietnamese emperor Minh Mạng criticized this behavior on the basis that such discrepancies would cause fear and suspicion among his officials. Earlier in 1835, Minh Mạng had proclaimed that his capital was now the new "Central Domain" and that he was the true successor of the ancient Zhou dynasty, who once ruled the Nine Provinces of ancient China. To legitimize his rule, he constructed nine bronze urns to represent the Nine Provinces and to signify his association with Zhou sovereignty. According to Lydia He Liu, the Vietnamese, Koreans, and Japanese all placed themselves at the center of the Confucian world order and treated the Qing as its periphery.

=== Rituals ===
The Chinese tributary system required a set of rituals from the tributary states whenever they sought relations with China as a way of regulating diplomatic relations. The main rituals generally included:

- The sending of missions by tributary states to China
- The tributary envoys' kowtowing before the Chinese emperor as "a symbolic recognition of their inferiority" and "acknowledgment of their status of a vassal state"
- The presentation of tribute and receipt of the emperor's "vassals' gifts"
- The investiture of the tributary state's ruler as the legitimate king of his land

After the completion of the rituals, the tributary states engaged in their desired business, such as trade.

== History ==
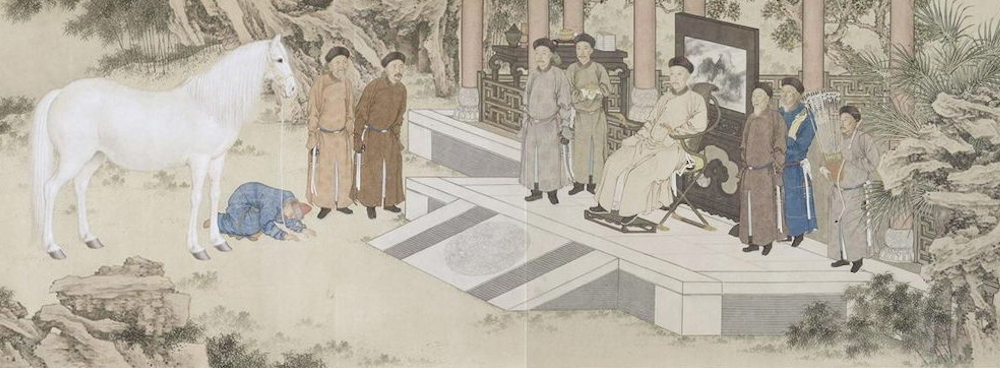
Kyrgyz deliver a white horse as a tribute to the Qianlong Emperor of China (1757), soon after the Qing conquest of Xinjiang. Soon, intensive trade started in Kulja and Chuguchak, Kyrgyz horses, sheep and goats being traded for Chinese silk and cotton fabrics.

Tributary relations emerged during the Tang dynasty, under the reign of Emperor Taizong, as Chinese rulers started perceiving foreign envoys bearing tribute as a "token of conformity to the Chinese world order".

The Ming founder Hongwu Emperor adopted a maritime prohibition policy and issued tallies to "tribute-bearing" embassies for missions. Missions were subject to limits on the number of persons and items allowed.

=== Korea ===
The Old Book of Tang and New Book of Tang recorded Silla sending women, 4 in total, all rejected, gold, silver among other things as tribute to the Tang dynasty.

If Silla indeed served China wholeheartedly by dispatching tributary ships one after another, why did King Beopheung use his own reign title? This is indeed confusing! From then on, Silla maintained this erroneous practice for many more years, even after Emperor Taizong had learned about it and reproved the Silla ambassador. Now, they eventually adopted the Tang reign title. Although a move out of necessity, we may still say that they have been able to correct their mistake

— Kim Pusik (1075–1151) writing on the nature of Silla's tributary relationship with China

Goryeo's rulers called themselves "Great King" viewing themselves as the sovereigns of the Goryeo-centered world of Northeast Asia. They maintained their own Imperial style, in their setup of government institutions, administrative divisions and own tributary system.

After the defeat of the Yuan in 1368, King Gongmin of Goryeo terminated tributary relations with the Yuan and established tributary relations with the Ming. However, Gongmin's relationship with the Ming did not replicate the same kind of close political control that Goryeo was subjected to under the Yuan. Gongmin only paid lip service to the tributary relationship with the Ming and performed rites such as memorial services to Heaven that were only meant for the Son of Heaven (emperor) rather than a king. When Emperor Hongwu sent Ming envoys to erect a tombstone in Goryeo territory to perform a memorial service signifying Goryeo's tributary status, Gongmin excused himself from attending the reception by pretending to be sick. After the Ming envoys left, Gongmin ordered for the tombstone to be dug up and thrown away. Goryeo sent military forces to the Ming border region of Liaodong in 1370 to eliminate pro-Yuan factions that dominated the area, but this also caused the Ming to grow suspicious of Goryeo's intentions. After Gongmin was assassinated in 1374, his successor, King U, was dominated by a pro-Yuan court that re-established tributary relations with Northern Yuan while also sending tribute to the Ming in 1385. Due to these actions, Emperor Hongwu grew suspicious of Goryeo's intentions and withheld investiture from both the Goryeo kings and the Joseon founder. Hongwu demanded heavy tributes reminiscent of the Mongol Yuan tributes but also forbade Goryeo from sending more than one tribute mission every three years due to fear that they were collecting intelligence on the Ming. Goryeo paid an enormous tribute to Ming in February 1385 consisting of five thousand horses, five hundred jin of gold, fifty thousand jin of silver and fifty thousand bolts of cotton fabric. At one point Hongwu declared an end to relations with Goryeo.

In 1387, the Ming defeated the Mongol chieftain Naghachu in the Liaodong region and announced their intention to lay claim to northeastern Korea, formerly Ssangsŏng Prefecture under the Yuan dynasty. Goryeo responded by sending a 50,000 strong army under deputy commander Yi Seong-gye to attack the Ming in 1388. When Yi reached Wihwa Island at the border, he refused to carry out the invasion and instead turned back the army to depose King U. In 1392, Yi Seong-gye, also known as Taejo of Joseon, officially founded the state of Joseon, cut off relations with the Mongols and sent tributary envoys to the Ming founder Emperor Hongwu for recognition.

Supporting Yi were two pro-Ming groups, the Neo-Confucian scholar-bureaucrats and his military forces. Yi felt that the campaign was ill-planned and even if they had been victorious in combat, Goryeo's internal conditions would be incapable of sustaining the victory with sufficient supplies. There were also suspicions that the campaign was an excuse to remove Yi from power due to his growing influence. A record called Haedong akpu indicates that General Ch'oe Yŏng was possibly scheming against Yi. The Neo-Confucian scholar class was also in conflict with the pro-Yuan elements at court that came to dominate King U's administration. After Yi returned to the capital, he adopted Ming attire and started using the Ming era name Hongwu. Due to the military coup, neither Yi or the Neo-Confucian scholars held strong domestic support, so they sought recognition by the Ming court to strengthen their power and restrain their opposition. When the Neo-Confucian scholar Yi Saek met with Hongwu, he requested that the Ming send an official to supervise Goryeo's domestic situation. When Yi Seong-gye officially founded Joseon in 1392, he also sought Ming recognition for his new state and him as the new ruler.

=== Japan ===
Early kings of Japan had formal diplomatic inquiries with the Jin dynasty and its successors and were appointed as "King of Wa". The Emperors of China commonly referred to the ruler of Japan as 倭寇王 wōkouwang (wakuō) meaning "King of Wa", while they themselves styled themselves as ōkimi, meaning "Great King" in relation to the Chinese emperor. Internally 天皇 tennō meaning "heavenly king" also used to put the ruler of Japan on the same level as the one of China.

The kentōshi route, the sea route from Japan to China used during the Tang dynasty

Between 607 and 839, Japan submitted and sent 19 missions to China under the Sui and Tang dynasties (a mission planned for 894 was cancelled). The nature of these bilateral contacts evolved gradually from political and ceremonial acknowledgment to cultural exchanges; and the process accompanied the growing commercial ties which developed over time. Knowledge was the principal objective of each expedition. For example: Priests studied Chinese Buddhism. Officials studied Chinese government. Doctors studied Chinese medicine. Painters studied Chinese painting. Approximately one third of those who embarked from Japan did not survive to return home.

Japan under the Ashikaga shogunate again became a tributary of China under the Ming dynasty in 1401. As a result, in 1402 or 1404, Shogun Ashikaga Yoshimitsu, who held most of the de facto power in Japan, accepted the title "King of Japan" from the Ming, despite the nominal sovereign of Japan still residing in Kyōto. Yoshimitsu, who bowed three times and while kneeling, read a Ming government document addressing him as the "king of Japan" and instructing him to adopt the Ming calendar. In 1403, Yoshimitsu sent a letter to the Ming emperor addressing himself as "Your subject, the King of Japan". He was the first and only Japanese ruler in the early modern period to accept a Chinese title. None of Yoshimitsu's successors adopted the same stance towards the Ming. The act of submission towards the Ming is viewed negatively by many modern Japanese historians. Tsuji Zennosuke and Kuroita Katsumi described Yoshimitsu's decision as a violation of Japan's national tradition, an act of disloyalty to the Japanese throne, and brought shame and disgrace to Japan. Zuikei Shuho, a contemporary of Yoshimitsu, pointed out that the word "your subject" should only be used to show allegiance to the Japanese emperor. In 1411, Yoshimitsu's successor and son, Ashikaga Yoshimochi, ended Japanese embassies to the Ming and repudiated his predecessor by stating that "ever since antiquity our country has never called itself a vassal of a foreign land". However, there were also supporters of Yoshimitsu's choice to accept official tributary status with the Ming. Arai Hakuseki, a supporter of the military class, wrote in his Tokushi yoron that Yoshimitsu increased his reputation outside Japan by being recognized as the ruler of Japan by the Ming. Haruseki believed that it was proper to use the title "King of Japan" because the shōgun was the de facto ruler rather than the Japanese emperor. Several explanations have been given for why Yoshimitsu accepted tributary relations with the Ming, including: he was not aware of the political significance of his action, he accepted tributary relations to increase trade, he accepted tributary relations to solidify his own position within Japan as its ruler rather than the Japanese emperor.

Tribute missions to the Ming resumed in 1432 under Yoshimochi's brother, Ashikaga Yoshinori, and lasted until 1549 when Japan chose to end its recognition of China's regional hegemony and canceled any further tribute missions. Membership in the tributary system was a prerequisite for any economic exchange with China. In exiting the system, Japan relinquished its trade relationship with China. Under the rule of the Wanli Emperor, Ming China quickly interpreted the Japanese invasions of Korea (1592–1598) which failed as a challenge to the Ming centered predominant worldview and order.

=== Thailand ===
Thailand was an important Chinese tributary state from the Sui dynasty (581–618), until the Taiping Rebellion of the late Qing dynasty during the mid-19th century. The Sukhothai Kingdom, the first unified Thai state, established official tributary relations with the Yuan dynasty during the reign of King Ram Khamhaeng, and Thailand remained a tributary of China until 1853.

Wei Yuan, the 19th century Chinese scholar, considered Thailand to be the strongest and most loyal of China's Southeast Asian tributaries, citing the time when Thailand offered to directly attack Japan to divert the Japanese in their planned invasions of Korea and the Asian mainland, as well as other acts of loyalty to the Ming dynasty. Thailand was welcoming and open to Chinese immigrants, who dominated commerce and trade, and achieved high positions in the government.

=== Vietnam ===
Vietnam was ruled by China for 1050 years. When Vietnam gained independence in 939, it became a tributary of China until 1885 when it became a protectorate of France with the Treaty of Huế (1884). The Lê dynasty (1428–1527) and Nguyễn dynasty (1802–1945) adopted the imperial Chinese system, with rulers declaring themselves emperors on the Confucian model and attempting to create a Vietnamese imperial tributary system while still remaining a tributary state of China.

Even though Vietnam was the only sinicized country in Southeast Asia, the Ming dynasty treated it with less respect than Korea or the Ryukyu Kingdom. The Hongwu Emperor was firmly opposed to military expeditions in Southeast Asia and only rebuked Vietnam's conquest of Champa, which had sent tribute missions to China seeking help. After the death of Emperor Hongwu, the Chinese intervened after a Vietnamese general, Le Qui Ly, usurped the Vietnamese throne.

The Malacca sultanate sent envoys to China to inform them that while returning to Malacca in 1469 from a trip to China, their ship had been driven by a storm to the coast of Vietnam and the Vietnamese killed, enslaved and castrated the survivors. The Malaccans reported that Vietnam was in control of Champa and that the Vietnamese sought to conquer Malacca, but the Malaccans did not fight back because of a lack of permission from the Chinese to engage in war. Malacca avoided reciprocating hostilities until they received a letter from the Ming dynasty, in which the Ming emperor scolded them, ordering the Malaccans to raise soldiers and retaliate if the Vietnamese attacked.

According to a 2018 study in the Journal of Conflict Resolution covering Vietnam-China relations from 1365 to 1841, "the Vietnamese court explicitly recognized its unequal status in its relations with China through a number of institutions and norms." Due to their participation in the tributary system, Vietnamese rulers behaved as though China was not a threat and paid very little military attention to it. Rather, Vietnamese leaders were clearly more concerned with quelling chronic domestic instability and managing relations with kingdoms to their south and west."

=== Ryukyu Kingdom ===
From the late 14th to early 16th centuries, the Ryukyu Kingdom served an important position in the Ming's tributary order, as they became a key intermediary for the Ming's trade with Northeast and Southeast Asia through goods funnelled into Ming-Ryukyu tribute missions. Ryukyu's intermediary role was also facilitated by Chinese diaspora communities who settled in Ryukyu and served positions in the Ryukyu court.

=== Maritime Southeast Asia ===
The Sultanate of Malacca and the Sultanate of Brunei sent tribute to the Ming dynasty, with their first rulers personally traveling to China with the Imperial fleets.

In the Philippine Islands, trade with China is believed to have begun during the Tang dynasty, and expanded during the Song dynasty; by the second millennium AD, some polities were part of the tributary system of China, among them the Sultanate of Sulu.

== Modern geopolitics ==
The Chinese tributary system was invoked by a few Chinese netizens who supported the erroneous statement made by an anchor of the state-run China Central Television (CCTV) in May 2012. She accidentally said "the Philippines belongs to Chinese sovereignty", a month after the start of the Scarborough Shoal standoff between China and the Philippines. While the original broadcast was eventually taken down, one of her online supporters claimed, "she was speaking the truth. Japan was a tributary state of China, too, and so was Korea, Vietnam, etc." A Time opinion remarked the Chinese perspective on the history of the tributary system conflicts with the perspectives by their former tributary states like Vietnam.

Criticism of the Western tributary conceptualisation of pre-modern Chinese 'diplomatic' practice has been central to certain strands of modern Chinese international relations. Criticism of John King Fairbank's theory in favour of a historical account describing a polycentric, pluralistic, and symbiotic order has for example been a staple of Ren Xiao's foundational writings on gongsheng (symbiotic) relations theory. This has contributed to the political salience of such historical debates, with such readings emphasising harmony, absence of hegemony, and unity in diversity featuring prominently in Chinese state-endorsed concepts such as the "community of common destiny for mankind (人类命运共同体)" or "harmonious world (和谐世界)" (related to Harmonious Society).

== See also ==
- Emperor of China
- List of recipients of tribute from China
- List of tributary states of China
- Ming dynasty
- List of diplomatic missions of the Qing dynasty
- Tian ("Heaven") / Shangdi ("God")
  - Tianxia ("All Under Heaven")
  - Tian Chao ("Dynasty of Heaven")
  - Tian Kehan ("Khan of Heaven")
  - Tian Ming ("Mandate of Heaven")
  - Tianzi ("Son of Heaven")
- Pax Sinica
- Tributary state
- Emperor at home, king abroad
- East Asian cultural sphere
- Little China (ideology)
- Mandala (political model)
- Hua–Yi distinction
- Guanxi
