= Bogda Khan =

Chinese royal title

Bogda Khan (Mongolian: Богд хаан, ᠪᠣᠭᠳᠠ ᠬᠠᠭᠠᠨ, "Boγda Qaγan"; Chinese: 博格達汗) was a title in the Mongolian language used by emperors of the Qing dynasty of China. It combines the title "Khan" or Khagan ("Qaγan") traditionally used among the Turco-Mongols with the term Bogda (Boγda), meaning "Holy" or "God" in Mongolian. "Bogda Khan" as a whole therefore means "Holy Khan" or "Holy Ruler".

Hong Taiji, the second khan of the Later Jin dynasty, conquered the Northern Yuan dynasty in 1635. He started to use the Mongolian title "Boγda Sečen Qaγan" (Mongolian: Богд Сэцэн хаан, ᠪᠣᠭᠳᠠ ᠰᠡᠴᠡᠨ ᠬᠠᠭᠠᠨ, Chinese: 博格達徹辰汗), and he once referred to himself as "Bogda Khan" in letters to upper-class figures in Mongolia and Tibet.

After the proclamation of the Qing dynasty in 1636, the titles of the all Qing emperors in the Mongolian language contained "Bogda Khan", so it was commonly used by ethnic Mongol subjects to refer to the Qing rulers. During the early Qing period, the Tsardom of Russia also used this title to refer to the emperors of Qing China since the Russians had contact with the Mongol subjects of the Qing dynasty before officially communicating with the Qing imperial court. For example, the Qing ruler was referred to as the "Chinese Highness Bogda Khan" (Russian: китайского бугдыханова высочества) in the Russian version of the 1689 Treaty of Nerchinsk.

During the 1911 Revolution that eventually led to the fall of the Qing dynasty, Outer Mongolia declared its independence from the Qing dynasty under the leadership of the 8th Jebtsundamba Khutuktu, who used the title Bogd Khan (as the successor of Bogda Khan) and established the Bogd Khanate.

== See also ==
- Bogdan
- Bogd Khan
- Mongolia under Qing rule
- List of emperors of the Qing dynasty
- Khan of Heaven
- Emperor Manjushri
