= Emperor Shao =

Emperor Shao literally means "the young emperor". In Chinese history, this term was used - usually as a byname - to refer to either those who became emperor at a very young age, or those emperors who ruled briefly (generally for less than 5 years). The term was first used for "former and latter young emperors" Qianshao and Houshao of Han, who ruled 188–180 BC but effectively were mere puppets of Empress Lü (by then empress dowager).

It may refer to:

- Emperor Qianshao of Han (reign: 188–184 BC), personal name Liu Gong (Qian means "Former")
- Emperor Houshao of Han (reign: 184–180 BC), personal name Liu Hong (Hou means "Later")
- Emperor Shao of Han (reign: 125), better known as the Marquess of Beixiang, personal name Liu Yi
- Emperor Shao of Han (reign: 189), better known as the Prince of Hongnong, personal name Liu Bian
- Emperor Shao of Song (reign: 422–424)
- Emperor Shao of Tang (reign: 710), the Emperor Shang of Tang (Shang also refers to the minority in age of the emperor)
- Emperor Shao of Later Jin, better known by his personal name Shi Chonggui

== See also ==
- Emperor Shang (disambiguation)
