= Khan of Heaven =

Turkic title given to the Tang dynasty

Khan of Heaven or Tian Kehan, Celestial Kha(ga)n, Heavenly Kha(ga)n, Tengri Kha(ga)n (Chinese: 天可汗; pinyin: Tiān Kèhán; Wade–Giles: T'ien K'ehan; Old Turkic: 𐱅𐰭𐰼𐰃𐰴𐰍𐰣) was a title addressed to the Emperor Taizong of Tang by various Turkic nomads. It was first mentioned in accounts on May 20, 630 and again on October 24, 646, shortly after the Eastern Turkic Khaganate and Xueyantuo were annihilated by the Tang dynasty. A later letter sent by the Tang court to the Yenisei Kirghiz Qaghan explained that "the peoples of the northwest" had requested Emperor Taizong of Tang to become the "Heavenly Qaghan".

According to Jonathan Karam Skaff, the title deviated from both Chinese and Turkic orthodoxy by bridging them through centering Heaven as the supreme deity in both cultures. The title conferred the right to rule and acknowledged the equality of Chinese and Turkic peoples within the Tang Empire.

The title remained in use by Taizong's successors until 779 AD, including Wu Zetian who assumed the title along with also the masculine form of the title emperor ("Huangdi", rather than "Nühuang" or "Huanghou", an empress) from 685 to 705. The title "Khan of Heaven" was used in two appeal letters from the Turkic hybrid rulers, Ashina Qutluγ Ton Tardu in 727, the Yabgu of Tokharistan, and Yina Tudun Qule in 741, the king of Tashkent, addressed the Emperor Xuanzong of Tang as Tian Kehan during the Umayyad expansion.

== See also ==
- Chinese Tributary System
  - Pax Sinica
- Emperor of China
  - Emperor Taizong of Tang
- Khan
  - Khagan (Great Khan)
  - Bogda Khan
- Sinocentrism
- Tang dynasty
  - Tang dynasty in Inner Asia
- Tian (Heaven) / Shangdi (God)
  - Tian Xia (All under Heaven)
  - Tian Chao (Dynasty of Heaven)
  - Tian Ming (Mandate of Heaven)
  - Tian Zi (Son of Heaven)
- Tengri
