= Land System of the Heavenly Dynasty =

Land reform program of the Taiping Heavenly Kingdom

Celestial Land System
- Simplified Chinese: 天朝田亩制度
- Traditional Chinese: 天朝田畝制度
- Enacted in: 1853

The Land System of the Heavenly Dynasty (simplified Chinese: 天朝田亩制度; traditional Chinese: 天朝田畝制度), also known as the System of the Heavenly Kingdom, Celestial Land System, Celestial Field System, and Land Programme of the Heavenly Dynasty, was a policy platform promulgated by the Taiping Heavenly Kingdom in 1853, after the capital was set in Tianjing.

The Celestial Land System was the basic program of the Taiping Heavenly Kingdom, and its basic content was about the land reform system, while referring to the central and local political systems, and also about the economic system.
