= Emperor Shang =

Emperor Shang may refer to:

- Emperor Shang of Han (105–106, r. 106)
- Emperor Shang of Tang (695–713, r. 710)
- Emperor Shang of Southern Han (920–943, r. 942), better known by his personal name Liu Bin
