= Son of Heaven =

Sacred imperial title of the Chinese emperor

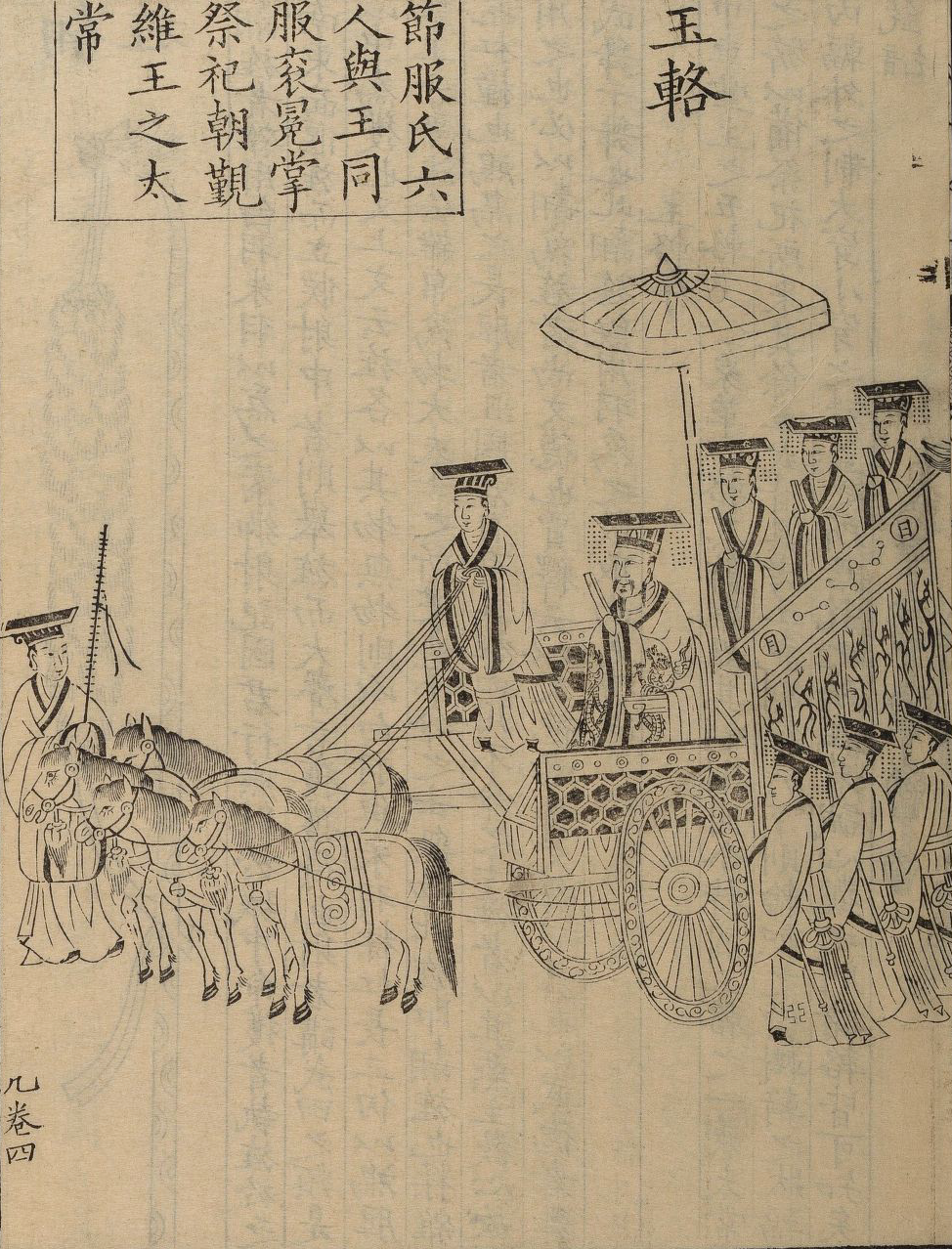
- The Son of Heaven escorted on the Yulu (玉輅), the carriage used exclusively by monarchs

Chinese name
- Chinese: 天子
Transcriptions
Standard Mandarin
- Hanyu Pinyin: Tiānzǐ
- Wade–Giles: T'ien1-tzu1
Middle Chinese
- Middle Chinese: tʰen t͡sɨ^{X}
Old Chinese
- Baxter–Sagart (2014): *l̥ˤin *tsəʔ

Vietnamese name
- Vietnamese alphabet: Thiên tử
- Chữ Hán: 天子

Korean name
- Hangul: 천자
- Hanja: 天子
Transcriptions
- Revised Romanization: Cheonja
- McCune–Reischauer: Ch'ŏnja

Japanese name
- Kanji: 天子
- Hiragana: てんし
Transcriptions
- Romanization: tenshi

Manchu name
- Manchu script: ᠠᠪᡴᠠᡳ ᠵᡠᡳ
- Möllendorff: abkai jui

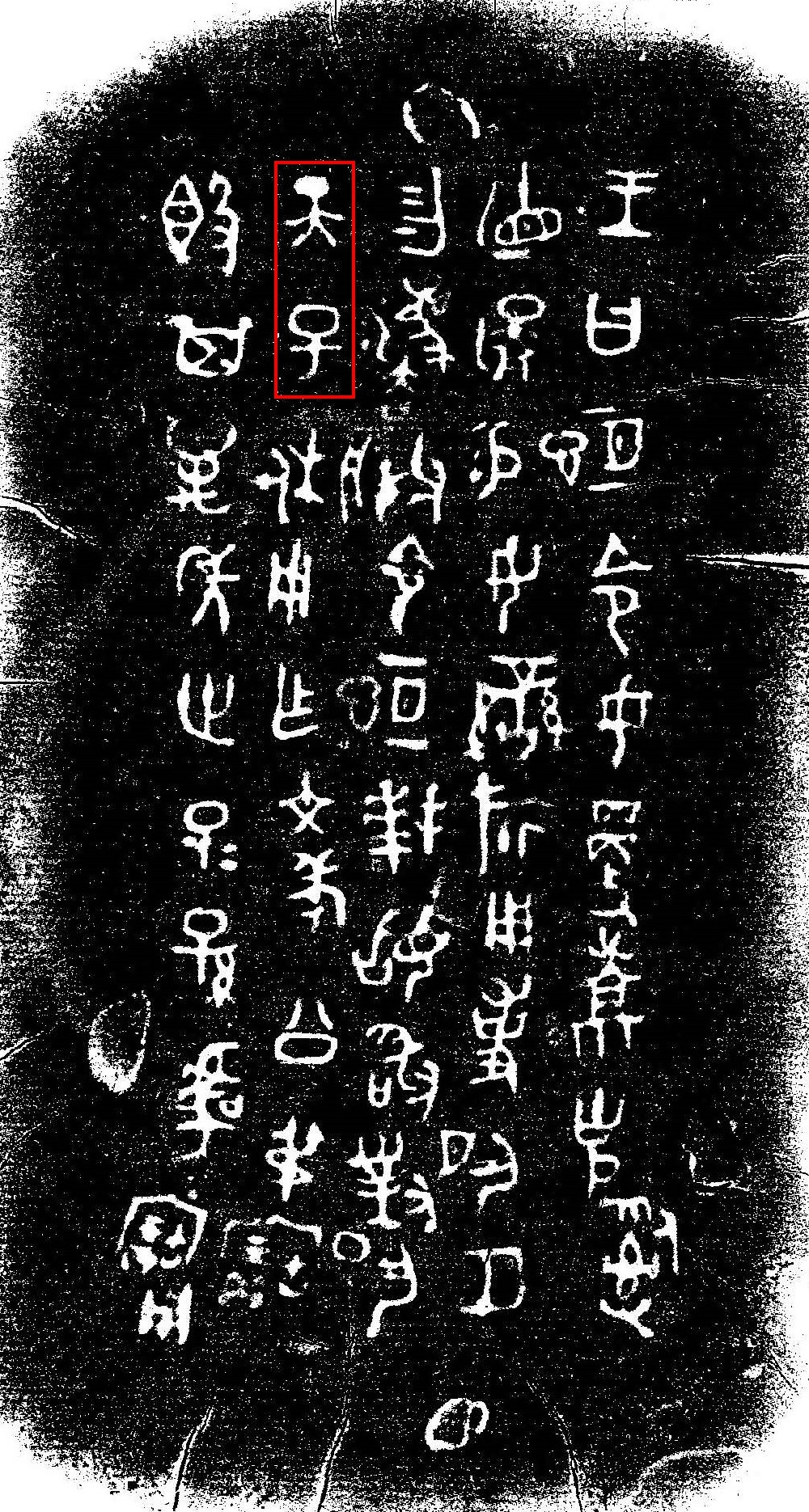
Inscription on Heng gui's lid (恒簋葢; 恆簋蓋; Héng guǐ gài), from Western Zhou period. Framed are the graphs 天子 in bronze script.

Son of Heaven, or Tianzi (Chinese: 天子; pinyin: Tiānzǐ), was the sacred monarchial and imperial title of the Chinese sovereign. It originated with the Zhou dynasty and was founded on the political and spiritual doctrine of the Mandate of Heaven. Since the Qin dynasty, the secular imperial title of the Son of Heaven was "Huangdi".

The title, "Son of Heaven", was subsequently adopted by other Sinospheric monarchs to justify their rule. The name Celestial Empire (or "Heavenly Dynasty") was also used in reference to the status of the Chinese emperor as the Son of Heaven in the Sinosphere.

The Son of Heaven was the supreme universal monarch, who ruled tianxia ("all under heaven"). His status is rendered in English as "ruler of the whole world." The title, "Son of Heaven", was interpreted literally only in China and Japan, whose monarchs were referred to as demigods, deities, or "living gods", chosen by the gods and goddesses of heaven.

== History and adoption ==
Son of Heaven was a title of the King Wu of Zhou and subsequent Chinese sovereigns.

The title "Son of Heaven" (Chinese: 天子; pinyin: Tiānzǐ; Middle Chinese: tʰen t͡sɨ^{X}; Old Chinese (B-S): *l̥ˤin *tsəʔ) is attested earliest in bronze inscriptions dated to the reign of King Kang of Zhou. This title stems from the concept of the Mandate of Heaven, created by the Zhou dynasty monarchs to justify their having deposed the Shang dynasty. They held that Heaven had revoked its mandate from the Shang and given it to the Zhou in retribution for Shang corruption and misrule. Heaven bestowed the mandate on whoever was most fit to rule. The title held the monarch responsible for the prosperity and security of his people by the threat of taking away his mandate. "Son of Heaven" was often one of several titles adopted by Sinospheric monarchs. The Emperor Taizong of Tang held the title "Son of Heaven", alongside the title "Khan of Heaven" (Tengeri Qaghan) which he had gained after defeating the Eastern Turkic Khaganate. Japanese monarchs likewise used a second title, tennō (天皇; "Heavenly Emperor"), that, like "Son of Heaven", appealed to the emperor's connection to Heaven.

The title carried widespread influence across East Asia as the ancient Chinese monarchical title, tianzi (天子), "Son of Heaven", was later adopted by the Emperor of Japan during the Asuka period. Japan sent diplomatic missions to China, then ruled by the Sui dynasty, and formed cultural and commercial ties with China. Japan's Yamato state modeled its government after the Chinese Confucian imperial bureaucracy. A Japanese mission of 607 CE delivered a message from "the Son of Heaven in the land where the sun rises ... to the Son of Heaven in the land where the sun sets." But the Japanese emperor's title was less contingent than that of his Chinese counterpart; there was no divine mandate that would punish Japan's emperor for failing to rule justly. The right to rule of the Japanese emperor, descended from the sun goddess Amaterasu, was absolute.

Based on epitaphs dating to the 4th and 5th centuries, Goguryeo had concepts of the Son of Heaven (天帝之子) and tianxia. The rulers of Goryeo used the titles of Holy Emperor-King (신성제왕, 神聖帝王) and Son of Heaven and positioned Goryeo at the center of the Haedong (海東; "East of the Sea") tianxia, which encompassed the historical domain of the "Samhan", another name for the Three Kingdoms of Korea.

The title was also adopted in Vietnam, known in Vietnamese as Thiên tử (Chữ Hán: 天子). A divine mandate gave the Vietnamese emperor the right to rule, based not on his lineage but on his competence to govern. Vietnam's adoption of a Confucian bureaucracy, presided over by Vietnam's Son of Heaven, led to the creation of a Vietnamese tributary system in Southeast Asia, modeled after the Chinese Sinocentric system in East Asia.

== See also ==
- Chinese sovereign
- Emperor of China
- Monarchy of China
- Emperor of Japan (Tennō)
- Emperor at home, king abroad
- Little China (ideology)
- Manifestation of God (Baháʼí Faith)
- Devaraja
- Divine Right of Kings
- Sinocentrism
  - Chinese Tributary System
  - Pax Sinica ("Chinese peace")
- Tian (Heaven) / Shangdi (God)
  - Tian Xia (All under Heaven)
  - Tian Chao (Dynasty of Heaven)
  - Tian Kehan (Khan of Heaven)
  - Tian Ming (Mandate of Heaven)
  - Tian Zi (Son of Heaven)
- Zhou dynasty
- Chanyu, title used by the Xiongnu's supreme leaders, prefaced with Chinese transcription 撐犁孤塗; Chēnglí gūtú which was glossed as "Son of Heaven" by Book of Han.
