= Emperor of China =

Monarchs of imperial China

- 皇帝
- Imperial
- Heirloom Seal of the Realm

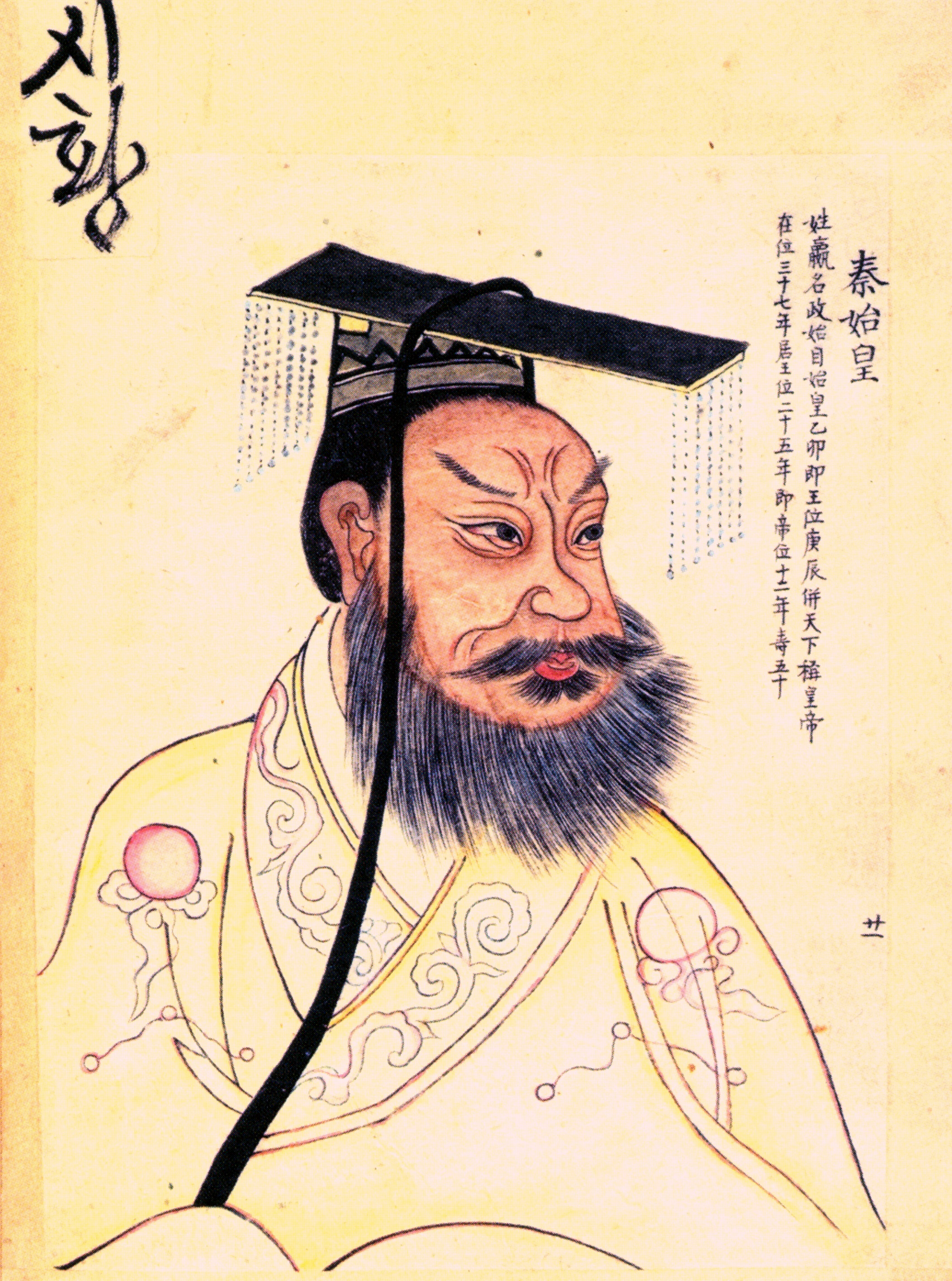
- First Emperor of China; Qin Shi Huang; 221 BCE – September 10, 210 BCE

Details
- Style: His Imperial Majesty (陛下) (Note: "His Imperial Majesty" is the common English translation of the style of Chinese monarchs with imperial ranks which is most oftenly used as an equivalent for 陛下 bìxià or "Beneath the ceremonial ramp".) and various others Son of Heaven (天子)
- First monarch: Qin Shi Huang
- Last monarch: Puyi
- Formed: 221 BC (2246–2247 years ago)
- Abolished: 12 February 1912 (114 years ago) (Note: Yuan Shikai was installed as Emperor in the short-lived Empire of China in December 1915, but abdicated after 83 days. Puyi was reinstated as Emperor for 12 days in 1917 in a failed coup attempt.)

Throughout Chinese history, "Emperor" (Chinese: 皇帝; pinyin: Huángdì) was the superlative title held by the monarchs of imperial China's various dynasties. In traditional Chinese political theory, the emperor was the "Son of Heaven", an autocrat with the divine mandate to rule all under Heaven. Emperors were often worshipped posthumously under a secular imperial cult. The lineage of emperors descended from a paternal family line constituted a dynasty, and succession in most cases theoretically followed agnatic primogeniture. The emperor of China was an absolute monarch, though in the late Qing reforms plans were made to move the emperor to a constitutional monarch.

During the Han dynasty, Confucianism gained sanction as the official political theory. The absolute authority of the emperor came with a variety of governing duties and moral obligations; failure to uphold these was thought to remove the dynasty's Mandate of Heaven and to justify its overthrow. In practice, emperors sometimes avoided the strict rules of succession and dynasties' purported "failures" were detailed in official histories written by their successful replacements or even later dynasties. The power of the emperor was also limited by the imperial bureaucracy, which was staffed by scholar-officials, and eunuchs during some dynasties. An emperor was also constrained by filial obligations to his ancestors' policies and dynastic traditions, such as those first detailed in the Ming-era Huang-Ming Zuxun (Ancestral Instructions).

== History ==
=== Origin ===
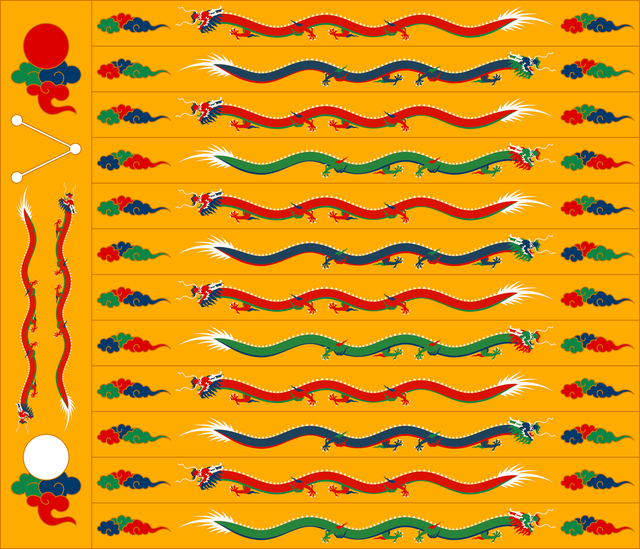
The Great Chang banner (大常/太常), also known as Banner of Celestial Bodies (辰旒), the highest ranking banner reserved for monarchs per Rites of Zhou.

During the Western Zhou dynasty (c. 1046 BC – 771 BC), Chinese vassal rulers with power over their particular fiefdoms served a strong central monarch. Following a brutal succession crisis and relocation of the royal capital, the power of the Zhou kings (王; wáng (Note: *‍ɢʷaŋ,)) waned, and during the Eastern Zhou period, the regional lords overshadowed the king and began to usurp that title for themselves. In 221 BC, after the King of Qin completed the conquest of the various kingdoms of the Warring States period, he adopted a new title to reflect his prestige as a ruler greater than the rulers before him. He called himself "Shi Huangdi", or the 'First Emperor'. Before this, Huang (皇 'August', 'sovereign' (Note: *‍ɢʷˤaŋ)) was most commonly seen as a reverential epithet for a deceased ancestor, and Di (帝, OC:*‍tˤeks) was an apical ancestor, originally referring to the deified ancestors of the Shang kings. (Note: Huang (皇) and Di (帝) were also terms applied to the Three Sovereigns and Five Emperors, mythical godly rulers and culture heroes credited with feats like ordering the sky and forming the first humans out of clay, as well as the invention of agriculture, clothing, astrology, music, etc.) In the 3rd century BC, the two titles had not previously been used together. The emperor of China, like the Zhou kings before him, and the Shang kings before them, was most commonly referred to as Tianzi (天子 'Son of Heaven'), who was divinely appointed to rule. The appellation Huangdi carried similar shades of meaning. Alternate English translations of the word include "The August Ancestor", "The Holy Ruler", or "The Divine Lord". On that account, some modern scholars translate the title as "thearch".

On occasion, the father of the ascended emperor was still alive. Such an emperor was titled as the Taishang Huang ('grand imperial sire'). The practice was initiated by Qin Shi Huang, who gave the title as a posthumous name to his own father, as was already common for monarchs of any stratum of power. Liu Bang, who established the Han dynasty, was the first to become emperor while his father yet lived. It was said he granted the title during his father's life because he would not be done obeisance to by his own father, a commoner.

Owing to political fragmentation, over the centuries, it has not been uncommon to have numerous claimants to the title of "Son of Heaven". The Chinese political concept of the Mandate of Heaven essentially legitimized those claimants who emerged victorious. The proper list was considered those made by the official dynastic histories; the compilation of a history of the preceding dynasty was considered one of the hallmarks of legitimacy, along with symbols such as the Nine Ding or the Heirloom Seal of the Realm. As with the First Emperor, it remained very common to grant posthumous titles to the ancestors of the victors.

The Yuan and Qing dynasties were founded by successful invaders of different ethnic groups. As part of their rule over China, they also went through the culturally appropriate rituals of formally declaring a new dynasty and taking on the Chinese title of Huangdi, in addition to the titles of their respective people, especially in the case of the Yuan dynasty. Thus, Kublai Khan was simultaneously khagan of the Mongols and emperor of China.

=== End of the imperial system ===
Imperial standard of the Emperor of the Great Qing.

In the 1900s, China made a series of reforms to modernise the government and military, adopting Japanese and German governance and laws. In 1911, the title of Prime Minister of the Imperial Cabinet was created to rule alongside the emperor, as part of an attempt to move China from an absolute monarchy to a constitutional monarchy.

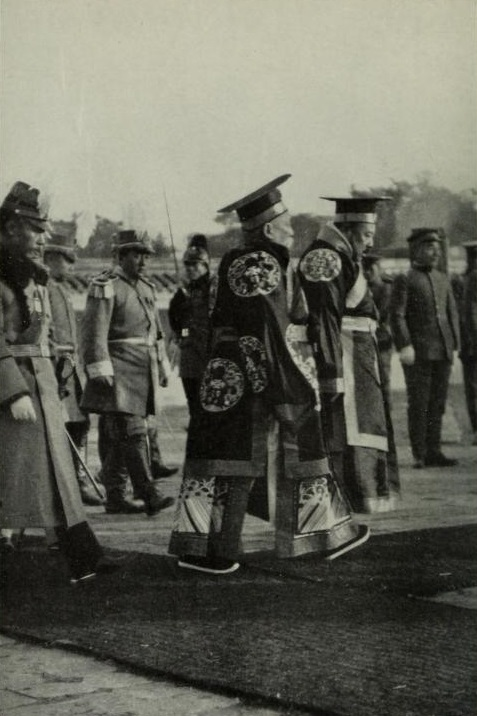
Coronation ceremony of the Hongxian Emperor in 1915.

Puyi, who had reigned as the Xuantong Emperor, abdicated on 12 February 1912, ending the Qing dynasty as well as the imperial tradition altogether, after more than 2100 years. Yuan Shikai, former President of the Republic of China, attempted to restore dynastic rule with himself as the Hongxian Emperor, however he abdicated the throne on 22 March 1916 after only 83 days, due to a revolt against his imperial rule. Puyi was briefly restored for 12 days during a coup in 1917 but was overthrown again shortly after. Although permitted to remain in the palace, he absconded to the Japanese concession in Tianjin in 1924. In 1934 he was installed as emperor of Manchukuo, a Japanese puppet state. In 1945, he was captured by the Red Army as a prisoner of war, where he was held in the Siberian city of Chita. In 1950, he was extradited to China and imprisoned in Fushun War Criminals Management Centre. He would be formally pardoned and released in 1959, working in a repair shop and as a researcher of literature and history until his death in 1967.

The current head of the House of Aisin-Gioro and hypothetical claimant to the throne is Jin Yuzhang. He has worked for various local councils on China, and has no interest in the restoration of monarchy.

== Enumeration ==
Traditional political theory holds that there can only be one legitimate Son of Heaven at any given time. However, identifying the "legitimate" emperor during times of division is not always uncontroversial, and therefore the exact number of legitimate emperors depends on where one stands on a number of succession disputes. The two most notable such controversies are whether Cao Wei or Shu Han had legitimacy during the Three Kingdoms, and at what point the Song dynasty ceased to be the legitimate dynasty in favor of the Yuan dynasty. The Qing view, reported to Europe by the Jesuits, was that there had been 150 emperors from the First Emperor to the Kangxi Emperor. Adding the eight uncontroversial emperors that followed the Kangxi Emperor would give a grand total of 158 emperors from the First Emperor to Puyi.

By one count, from the Qin dynasty to the Qing dynasty, there were a total 557 individuals who at one point or another claimed the title of Emperor, including several simultaneous claimants at various times. Some, such as Li Zicheng, Huang Chao, and Yuan Shu, declared themselves the emperors, Son of Heaven and founded their own empires as a rival government to challenge the legitimacy of and overthrow the existing emperor. Among the most famous emperors were Qin Shi Huang of the Qin dynasty, emperors Gaozu, Han Wudi as well as Guangwu of the Han, Emperor Taizong of Tang of the Tang, the Hongwu Emperor and Yongle Emperor of the Ming, and the Kangxi Emperor of the Qing.

== Power ==
The emperor's words were considered sacred edicts (圣旨; 聖旨), and his written proclamations were called 'directives from above' (上谕; 上諭). In theory, the emperor's orders were to be obeyed immediately. He was elevated above all commoners, nobility and members of the Imperial family. Addresses to the emperor were always to be formal and self-deprecatory, even by the closest of family members.

In practice, however, the power of the emperor varied between different emperors and different dynasties. Generally, in the Chinese dynastic cycle, emperors founding a dynasty usually consolidated the empire through comparative autocracy—examples include Qin Shi Huang, emperors Gaozu and Guangwu of Han, Emperor Taizong of Tang, Kublai Khan of the Yuan, and the Kangxi Emperor of the Qing.

The usual method for widespread geographic power consolidation was to involve the whole family. From generation to generation, the bonds weakened between the branches of family established as local rulers in different areas. After a sufficient period of time, their loyalty could no longer be assured, and the taxes they collected sapped the imperial coffers. This led to situations like the reign of Emperor Wu of Han, who disenfranchised and annihilated the nobilities of virtually all imperial relatives whose forebears had been enfeoffed by his own ancestor, Gaozu.

Apart from a few very energetic monarchs, the emperor usually delegated the majority of decision making to the civil bureaucracy (chiefly the chancellery and the Central Secretariat), the military, and in some periods the censorate. Paranoid emperors, like Emperor Wu of Han and the Ming's Hongwu Emperor, would cycle through high government officials rapidly, or simply leave top-ranking posts vacant, such that no one could threaten their power. During other reigns, certain officials in the civil bureaucracy wielded more power than the emperor himself.

Unlike Japanese emperors whom all belonged to a single dynasty, which could not be deposed through a change in the Mandate of Heaven due to being traditionally descended from Shinto goddess Amaterasu, Chinese dynasties could be deposed. Though Chinese emperors often developed imperial cults and fostered a cult of personality around themselves, they seldom claimed divine descent, for example Hongwu of Ming was born into a peasant family prior to seizing the throne.

The emperor's position, unless deposed in a rebellion, was always hereditary, usually by agnatic primogeniture. As a result, many emperors ascended the throne while still children. During minority reigns, the Empress Dowager, the emperor's mother, would usually possess significant political power, along with the male members of her birth family. In fact, the vast majority of female rulers throughout Chinese Imperial history came to power by ruling as regents on behalf of their sons; prominent examples include Empress Lü Zhi of the Han, as well as the empress dowagers Cixi and Ci'an during the Qing, who for a time ruled jointly as co-regents. Where Empresses Dowager were too weak to assume power, or her family too strongly opposed, court officials often seized control. Court eunuchs had a significant role in the power structure, as emperors often relied on a few of them as confidants, which gave them access to many court documents. In a few places, eunuchs wielded vast power; one of the most powerful eunuchs in Chinese history was Wei Zhongxian during the Ming. Occasionally, other nobles seized power as regents.

The actual area ruled by the emperor of China varied from dynasty to dynasty. In some cases, such as during the Southern Song dynasty, political power in East Asia was effectively split among several governments; nonetheless, the political fiction that there was but one ruler was maintained.

== Heredity and succession ==
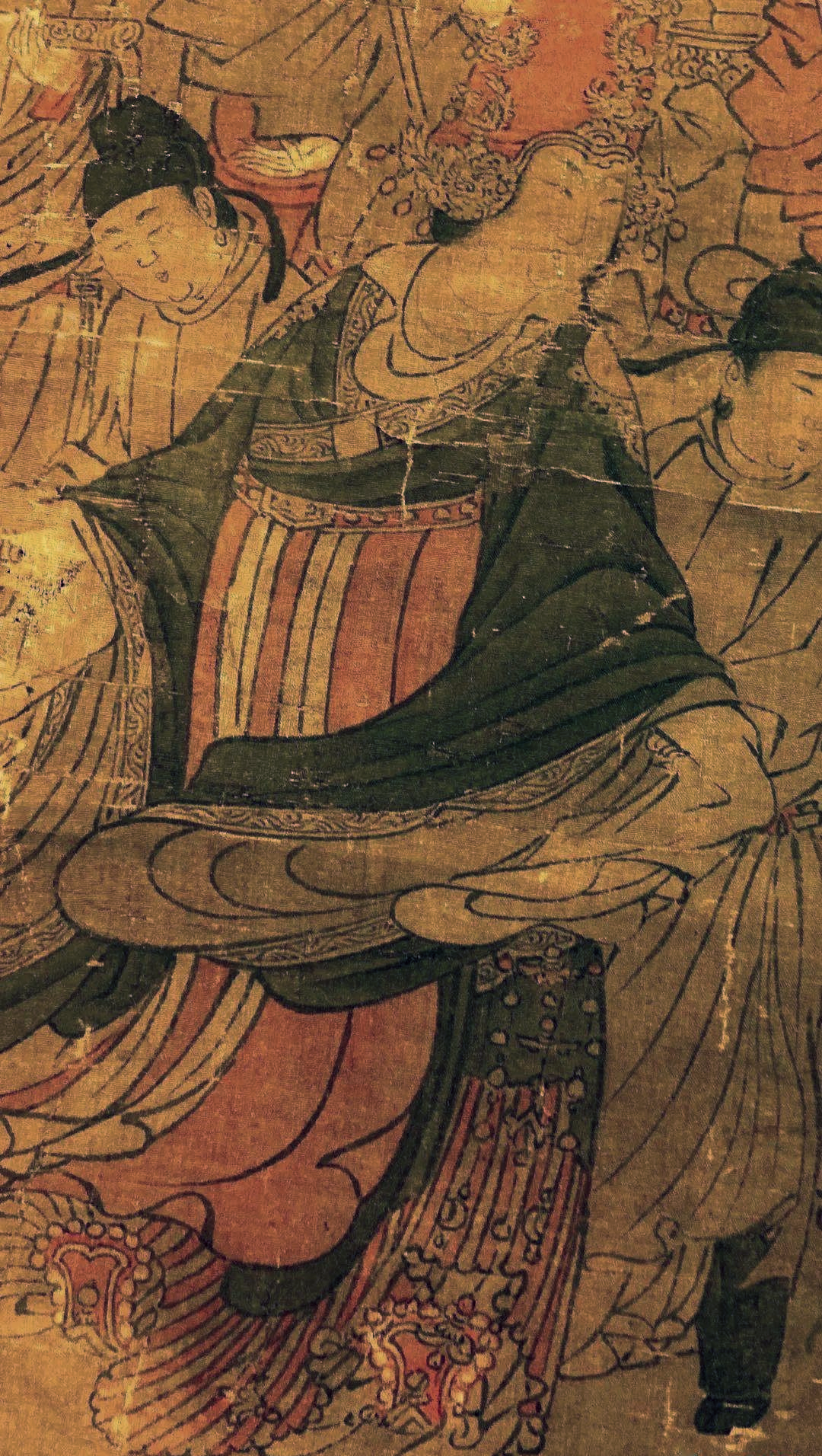
Wu Zetian, the only woman emperor in 3,000 years of Chinese dynastic history considered legitimate

The title of emperor was hereditary, traditionally passed on from father to son in each dynasty. There are also instances where the throne is assumed by a younger brother, should the deceased emperor have no male offspring. By convention in most dynasties, the eldest son born to the Empress consort (嫡长子; 嫡長子) succeeded to the throne. In some cases when the empress did not bear any children, the emperor would have a child with another of his many wives (all children of the emperor were said also to be the children of the empress, regardless of birth mother). In some dynasties the succession of the empress' eldest son was disputed, and because many emperors had large numbers of progeny, there were wars of succession between rival sons. In an attempt to resolve after-death disputes, the emperor, while still living, often designated a crown prince (太子). Even such a clear designation, however, was often thwarted by jealousy and distrust, whether it was the crown prince plotting against the emperor, or brothers plotting against each other. Some emperors, like the Yongzheng Emperor, after abolishing the position of Crown Prince, placed the succession papers in a sealed box, only to be opened and announced after his death.

Unlike, for example, the Japanese monarchy, Chinese political theory allowed for a change in the ruling house. This was based on the concept of the "Mandate of Heaven". The theory behind this was that the Chinese emperor acted as the "Son of Heaven" and held a mandate to rule over everyone else in the world; but only as long as he served the people well. If the quality of rule became questionable because of repeated natural disasters such as flood or famine, or for other reasons, then rebellion was justified. This important concept legitimized the dynastic cycle or the change of dynasties. This principle made it possible even for peasants to found new dynasties, as happened with the Han and Ming dynasties, and for the establishment of conquest dynasties such as the Mongol-led Yuan dynasty and Manchu-led Qing dynasty. It was moral integrity and benevolent leadership that determined the holder of the "Mandate of Heaven".

There has been only one lawful female emperor in Chinese history, Wu Zetian, who briefly replaced the Tang dynasty with her own Wu Zhou dynasty. Many women, however, did become de facto leaders, usually as empress dowager. Prominent examples include Empress Lü of the Han, Empress Liu of the Song, and Empress Dowager Cixi of the Qing.

== Styles, names and forms of address ==
As the emperor had, by law, an absolute position not to be challenged by anyone else, his subjects were to show the utmost respect in his presence, whether in direct conversation or otherwise. When approaching the imperial throne, one was expected to kowtow before the emperor. In a conversation with the emperor, it was considered a crime to compare oneself to the emperor in any way. It was taboo to refer to the emperor by his given name, even for the emperor's own mother, who instead was to use Huangdi (皇帝), or simply Er (儿; 兒 'son', for a male emperor). The given names of all the emperor's deceased male ancestors were forbidden from being written, and were avoided (避諱) by the use of synonyms, homophones, or leaving out the final stroke of the taboo character. This linguistic feature can sometimes be used to date historical texts, by noting which words in parallel texts are altered.

The emperor was never to be addressed as you. Instead, one used Bixia (陛下 'bottom of the steps'), corresponding to "Your Imperial Majesty" and originally referring to his attendants, Huangshang (皇上 'imperial highness', Shengshang (圣上; 聖上 'holy highness') or Tianzi (天子 'Son of Heaven'). The emperor was also alluded to indirectly through reference to the imperial dragon symbology. Servants often addressed the emperor as Wansuiye (万岁爷; 萬歲爺 'lord of ten thousand years'). The emperor referred to himself as zhen (朕), the original Chinese first-person singular pronoun arrogated by Qin Shi Huang, functioning as an equivalent to the royal we. This pronoun has also been historically used by Japanese emperors. In front of subjects, the emperor may also refer to themselves self-deprecatingly as Guaren (寡人 'the morally-deficient one') or Gu (孤 'lonely one').

In contrast to the Western convention of using a regnal or personal name (e.g. George V) to refer to a sovereign, the emperor was referred to in the third person simply as Huangdi Bixia (皇帝陛下 'His Majesty the Emperor') or Dangjin Huangshang (当今皇上; 當今皇上 'present emperor above'). Under the Qing, the emperor was usually styled 'His Imperial Majesty the Emperor of the Great Qing Dynasty, Son of Heaven, Lord of Ten Thousand Years', though this varied considerably. In historical texts, the present emperor was almost universally referred to as Shang (上).

Generally, emperors also ruled with an era name (年号; 年號; nián hào). Since the adoption of era names by Emperor Wu of Han and up until the Ming dynasty, the sovereign conventionally changed the era name semi-regularly during his reign. During the Ming and Qing dynasties, emperors simply chose one era name for their entire reign, and people often referred to past emperors with that title. In earlier dynasties, the emperors were known with a temple name given after their death. Most emperors were also given a posthumous name which was sometimes combined with the temple name (e.g. Emperor Shengzu Ren 圣祖仁皇帝; 聖祖仁皇帝 for the Kangxi Emperor). The passing of an emperor was referred to as Jiabeng (驾崩; 駕崩 'collapse of the imperial chariot') and an emperor that had just died was referred to as Daixing Huangdi (大行皇帝 'the emperor of the great journey').

== Consorts and children ==
In Imperial China, child marriage was the norm. The imperial family was made up of the emperor and the empress (皇后) as the primary consort and Mother of the Nation (国母; 國母). In addition, the emperor would typically have several other consorts and concubines (嫔妃; 嬪妃), ranked by importance into a harem, in which the Empress was supreme. However having concubines was not always the case as both Emperor Fei of Western Wei and Hongzhi Emperor were known to be monogamous. Every dynasty had its set of rules regarding the numerical composition of the harem. During the Qing dynasty, for example, imperial convention dictated that at any given time there should be one Empress, one Imperial Noble Consort, two Noble Consort, four Consort and six Concubine, plus an unlimited number of Noble Lady, First Class Attendant and Second Class Attendant. Although the emperor had the highest status by law, by tradition and precedent the empress dowager (皇太后) or in some cases, the grand empress dowager (太皇太后) usually received the greatest respect in the palace and was the decision maker in most family affairs. At times, especially when a young emperor was on the throne, the Grand Empress Dowager or Empress Dowager was the de facto ruler. The emperor's children, the princes (皇子) and princesses (公主), were often referred to by their order of birth—e.g. Eldest Prince or Third Princess. Princes were often given titles of peerage once they reached adulthood. The emperor's brothers and uncles served in court by law, and held equal status with other court officials (子). The emperor was always elevated above all others despite any chronological or generational superiority.

== Ethnicity ==
Recent scholarship is wary of applying present-day ethnic categories to historical situations. Most Chinese emperors have been considered members of the Han ethnicity, but there were also many Chinese emperors who were of non-Han ethnic origins. The most successful of these were the Khitans of the Liao dynasty, the Jurchens of the Jin dynasty (1115–1234), who later ruled the Qing dynasty as the Manchus, and the Mongols of the Yuan dynasty. The orthodox historical view sees these as dynasties as sinicized polities as they adopted Han culture, claimed the Mandate of Heaven, and performed the traditional imperial obligations such as annual sacrifices to Heaven for rain and prosperity. The revisionist New Qing History school, however, argues that the interaction between politics and ethnicity was far more complex and that elements of these dynasties differed from and altered "native Chinese" traditions concerning imperial rule.

== See also ==
- Chinese emperors family tree
  - Ancient – Early – Middle – Late
- Tributary system of China
- List of Chinese monarchs
- Dragon Throne
- Taishang Huang – an honorific for a retired emperor
- Celestial Empire
- Chinese Empire
- Khan of Heaven
- Emperor at home, king abroad
