= Self-revolution =

Chinese Communist Party slogan

Self-revolution (Chinese: 自我革命; pinyin: Zìwǒ gémìng) is a Chinese Communist Party (CCP) term to refer to a process in which the CCP is to remain "pure" and dynamic by rooting out corruption and ineffectual officials from its ranks. It was first proposed by CCP general secretary Xi Jinping in 2015.

== History ==
The term was first used by Chinese Communist Party general secretary Xi Jinping in 2015 during a speech to the Central Leading Group for Comprehensively Deepening Reform, calling on the leading group to "dare to self-revolutionize" (勇于自我革命). The phrase was also used in Xi's speech at the 95th anniversary of the CCP in 2016, as well as his political report to the 19th Party National Congress in 2017. At a meeting of the Central Commission for Discipline Inspection in 2021, Xi "put forward the goal and tasks of the Party’s self-revolution, and discussed the requirements for realizing self-purification, self-improvement, self-innovation, and self-improvement".

The sixth plenary session of the 19th Central Committee adopted the Resolution on the Major Achievements and Historical Experiences of the Party's 100 Years of Struggle, which put forward the concept as "the second answer" to escaping China's historical cycles of dynastic rise and falls; the first answer was given by Mao Zedong in 1945, who said "It is called democracy. As long as the public maintains their oversight of the government, the government will not slacken in its efforts".

== Description ==
Self-revolution is described as a process for the CCP to maintain "purity" and "eternal youth". It has been likened to "turning the blade inward to scrape away the poison" (勇于刀刃向内、刮骨疗毒) and "taking up the scalpel to remove our own tumors" (拿起手术刀来革除自身的毒瘤). At a meeting of the CCDI in 2022, Xi explained the concept:

Self-revolution is to strengthen the Party's foundation, detoxify and sterilize, make tough decisions, eliminate corruption and promote tissue regeneration, constantly eliminate the viruses that erode the Party's healthy body, constantly improve its own immunity, and prevent the Party from collapsing when its leaders die.

At the third session of the 20th Central Commission for Discipline Inspection in 2024, Xi put forward the Nine Requirements for realizing self-revolution. The Nine Requirements as defined by Xi are:

1. "Requiring upholding the centralized and unified leadership of the Party Central Committee as the fundamental guarantee."
2. "Requiring leading a great social revolution as the fundamental purpose."
3. "Requiring taking Xi Jinping Thought on Socialism with Chinese Characteristics for a New Era as our fundamental guideline."
4. "Requiring that the strategic goal is to break free from the historical cycle."
5. "Requiring that main focus be on solving the unique problems of large parties."
6. "Requiring taking improving the system of comprehensively and strictly governing the Party as an effective approach."
7. "Requiring focusing on forging a strong organization and building a highly competent team."
8. "Requiring rectifying conduct, enforcing discipline, and combating corruption as an important starting point."
9. "Requiring taking the combination of self-supervision and people's supervision as a powerful driving force."

== Analysis ==
Wang Junwei, a scholar at the Institute of Party History and Literature, said escaping China's historical cycles of dynastic rise and falls was "a difficult problem that has not been solved by China's feudal dynasties in for thousands of years". He added that the dissolution of the Soviet Union was a "painful lesson warns us that if the Marxist ruling party lacks the spirit of self-revolution… it will eventually be unable to escape the same tragic end".

Neil Thomas and Wang Shengyu of the Asia Society Policy Institute argue that self-revolution's goal is a way to make the CCP durable in the long-term: "If self-revolution succeeds, and it well might, it could make the CCP a more effective and durable institution—one capable of ruling China indefinitely irrespective of who is at the helm. In that sense, self-revolution is Xi's effort to render China's succession concerns moot".

== See also ==
- Anti-corruption campaign under Xi Jinping
