= Chinese modernization =

Chinese Communist Party slogan

Chinese modernization (Chinese: 中国式现代化), also called Chinese-style modernization or the Chinese path to modernization, is a Chinese Communist Party (CCP) political slogan that promotes the CCP's economic and political development model and contrasts with what the CCP terms "Western-style development."

== History ==
The term dates back to 1979, when Chinese leader Deng Xiaoping, who mentioned it during a March 1979 speech about the Four Cardinal Principles.

It became a standalone phrase in its own right under CCP general secretary Xi Jinping when, in April 2021, the People's Daily launched several articles on "dissecting Chinese-style modernization", leading rest of the Chinese state media to do the same. Wang Huning, the top political theorist under Xi, is considered to have been involved in developing the term.

The term featured prominently in a 2021 historical resolution of the CCP. The resolution said that Chinese-style modernization would further drive the "great rejuvenation of the Chinese nation." The term appeared 11 times at Xi's political report to the 20th CCP National Congress, held in October 2022. The term also was featured prominently at the first session of the 14th National People's Congress in March 2023.

== Overview ==
The term has been seen as an effort by Xi to focus on strengthening China's position in the world. It has also been used by Chinese leaders to envision a new type of development in the world; Xi said that Chinese-style modernization "breaks the myth of 'modernization equals Westernization'". According to Xi, Chinese-style modernization has "five characteristics" (五个特征), "nine basic demands" (九个本质要求), and "five major principles" (五个重大原则):

Characteristics and basic demands of Chinese-style modernization
Characteristics	Basic demands	Major principles
1. Huge population 2. Common prosperity for all 3. Material and cultural-ethical advancement 4. Harmony between humanity and nature 5. Peaceful development	1. Upholding the leadership of the Chinese Communist Party; 2. Adherence to socialism with Chinese characteristics 3. Pursuing high-quality development 4. Developing whole-process people's democracy 5. Enriching the people's cultural lives 6. Achieving common prosperity for all 7. Promoting harmony between humanity and nature 8. Building a human community with a shared future 9. Creating a new form of human advancement	1. Upholding and strengthening the Party's leadership 2. Adhering to the path of socialism with Chinese characteristics 3. Adhering to a people-centered development philosophy 4. Adhering to reform and opening up 5. Adhering and carrying forward a fighting spirit

In particular, achieving common prosperity is considered one of the key tenets of Chinese-style modernization under Xi; Zhang Zhanbin, an official at the CCP Central Party School wrote to the People's Daily that understanding the role of common prosperity is crucial to "clearly recognizing the major differences between Chinese-style modernization and the Western modernization path." Xi has stated that "Chinese modernization is socialist modernization", and that the leadership of the CCP is vital for Chinese-style modernization. He stated that without Party leadership, Chinese-style modernization "will veer off course, lose its soul, or even bring about catastrophic mistakes."

== See also ==
- China's peaceful rise
