= 20th National Congress of the Chinese Communist Party =

2022 Chinese Communist Party conference

- The flag of the Chinese Communist Party
- Begins: 16 October 2022
- Ends: 22 October 2022
- Locations: Great Hall of the People, Beijing, China
- Previous event: 19th National Congress of the Chinese Communist Party (2017)
- Participants: 2,296 delegates
- Major events: Election of the 20th Central Committee and 20th Central Commission for Discipline Inspection
- Leader: Xi Jinping (General Secretary of the Chinese Communist Party)
- Website: english.news.cn/special/cpc20/index.html

20th National Congress of the Chinese Communist Party
- Simplified Chinese: 中国共产党第二十次全国代表大会
- Traditional Chinese: 中國共產黨第二十次全國代表大會
Transcriptions
Standard Mandarin
- Hanyu Pinyin: Zhōngguó Gòngchǎndǎng Dìèrshícì Quánguó Dàibiǎo Dàhuì

Abbreviation
- Chinese: 二十大
Transcriptions
Standard Mandarin
- Hanyu Pinyin: èrshí dà

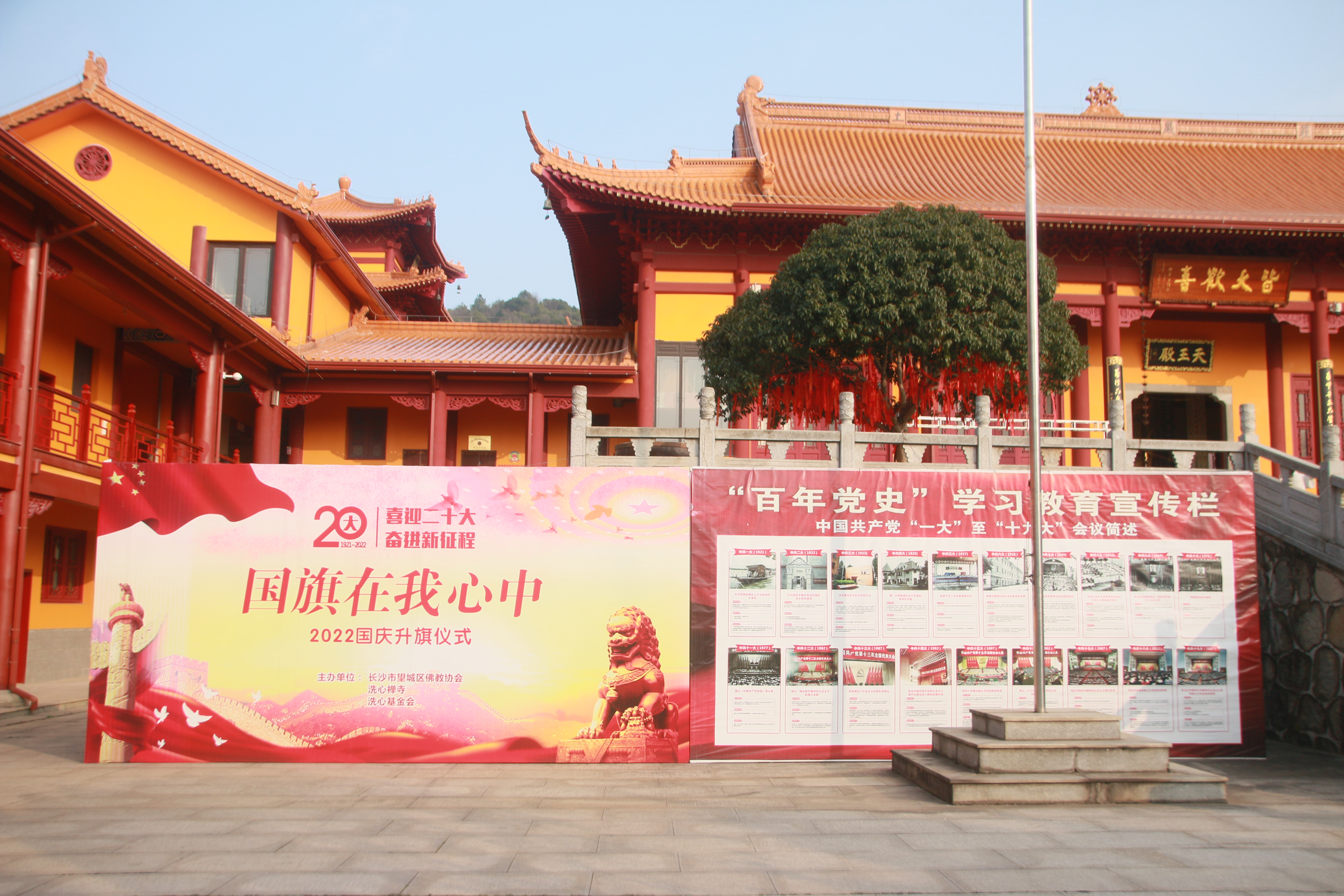
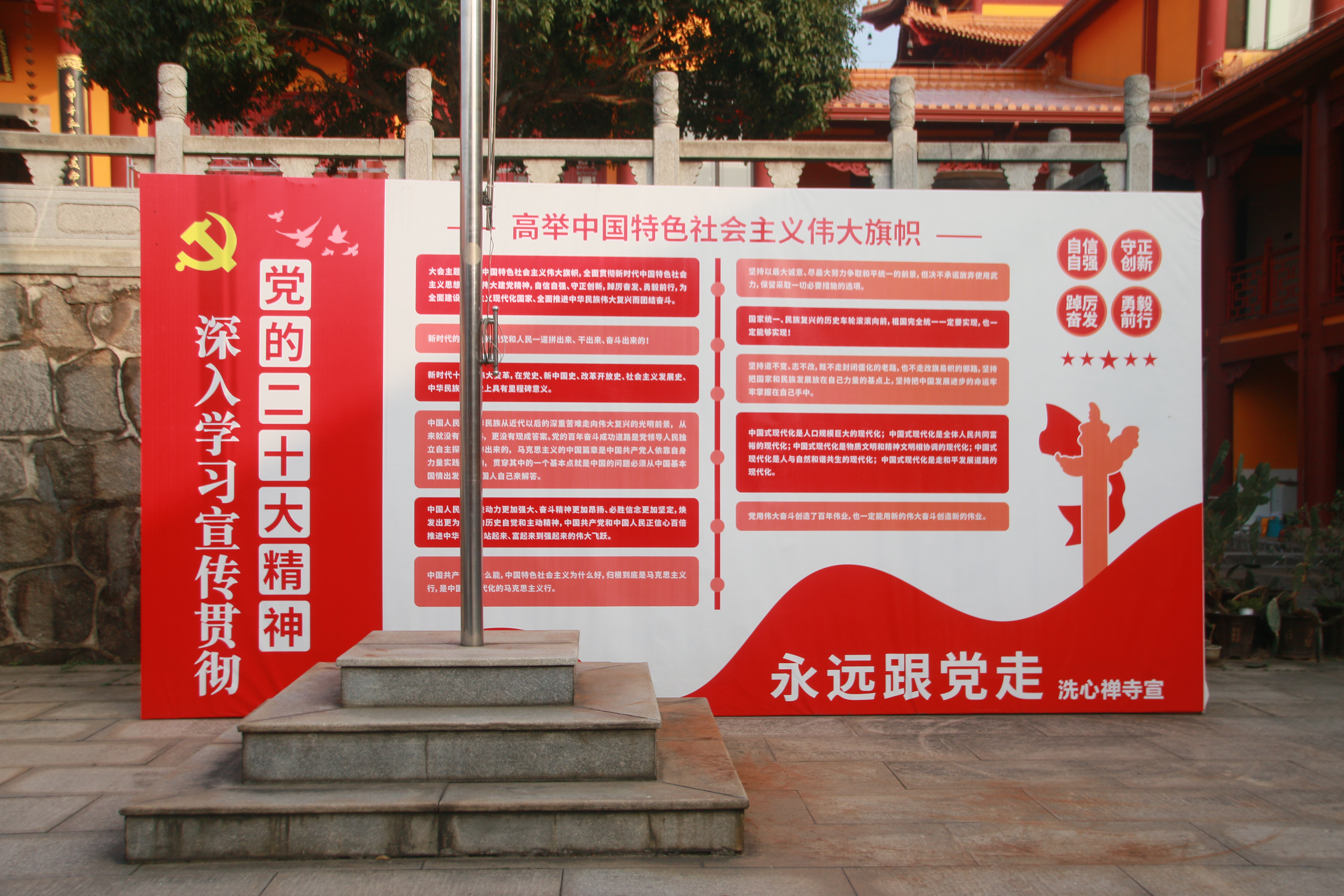
Publicity boards of the 20th National Congress in Xixin Chan Temple.

The 20th National Congress of the Chinese Communist Party was held in the Great Hall of the People, Beijing from 16 to 22 October 2022. The National Congress is the highest organ of the party, and is stipulated to be held every five years. The conference had 2,296 delegates and 83 specially invited delegates.

Preparations for the National Congress and election for the delegates began in November 2021, while the Congress opened in October 2022. During the National Congress, General Secretary Xi Jinping delivered the political report of the outgoing 19th Central Committee. The National Congress endorsed the amendments to the CCP constitution, membership list of the Central Commission for Discipline Inspection and elected the 20th Central Committee. The day after the closing of the Congress, the new Central Committee's first plenary session was held at which the Central Committee approved the composition of the Secretariat, and soon after, the members of the Politburo and its Standing Committee, the party's most powerful decision-making body. Xi Jinping secured a third term as CCP general secretary after the Congress.

== Background and preparation ==
Preparations for the 20th Chinese Communist Party National Congress began in 2021 and ended with a plenary session of the 19th Central Committee, a few days prior to the 20th National Congress. In November 2021, the 19th Central Committee decided in its sixth plenary session that the 20th National Congress would be held in the second half of 2022. Elections for the delegates of the 20th Chinese Communist Party National Congress started in November 2021, as well as receiving and amending party documents, with the CCP Central Committee determining the Congress would have 2,300 delegates to be elected by 38 electoral units across China. The CCP Organization Department then convened a meeting to make arrangements for the election of delegates to the 20th National Congress.

Starting from April 2022, CCP General Secretary Xi Jinping instructed that the 20th National Congress be the first national congress in the history of the CCP to solicit opinions online. On 17 April 2022, the Guangxi delegates voted to determine the delegates from the region to the 20th National Congress, with Xi being elected unanimously. The communique of the meeting used the phrase "forever support the leader, defend the leader, and follow the leader", while Liu Ning, the Party Secretary of Guangxi, said the election "reflects the common aspirations and strong desire of hundreds of millions of people to follow the leader of the great rejuvenation of the Chinese nation and create a better future". Subsequently, the Guangxi authorities printed a large number of "red books" on Xi Jinping Thought, namely Xi Jinping Thought on Socialism with Chinese Characteristics for a New Era: A Study for All, for CCP and government officials, enterprise employees, students, farmers, and others to read.

In May 2022, the CCP General Office issued a set of regulations warning retired members not to make any 'negative' political comments or engage in discussion of the party's policies in the run-up to the 20th National Congress and that violations of the disciplinary rules will be 'dealt with seriously'. On 30 August, the Politburo held a meeting for preparatory work for the seventh plenary session of the 19th Central Committee and the 20th National Congress, which put the dates for the plenary session and the Congress on 9 October and 16 October respectively. On 9 September, the Politburo held a meeting to study the draft report of the 19th CCP Central Committee ad the 19th Central Commission for Discipline Inspection to the Congress, as well as the draft amendment to the National Congress. The meeting also reviewed the report of the Politburo on the implementation of the Eight-point Regulation of the CPC Central Committee and the report on the work of rectifying formalism and reducing the burden on the grassroots. A total of 2,296 delegates were elected to represent the Chinese Communist Party (CCP)'s 96.7 million members by 25 September 2022.

In September, unsubstantiated rumors of a coup spread throughout social media, but were quashed after Xi Jinping appeared days later. On 13 October, three days prior to the opening of the CCP National Congress, the Beijing Sitong Bridge protest took place. This protest against Xi Jinping and his policies was rare as it came just days before the start of the Congress, a period during which the authorities imposed extremely tight control over protests and dissent. Similar protest slogans subsequently appeared in other cities in China and around the world. Some people shared these messages as graffiti or via AirDrop.

From 9 to 12 October, the 19th Central Committee held its seventh plenary session, where Xi delivered a work report to the plenary session on behalf of the Politburo while Wang Huning explained to the plenary session the draft of the CCP Constitution. The plenary session discussed and adopted the reports of the 19th Central Committee and the 19th Central Commission for Discipline Inspection to the 20th National Congress, and set 16 October as the opening session of the Congress. On 15 October, a preparatory meeting of the party congress was presided by CCP general secretary Xi Jinping, which elected the Presidium of the 20th Chinese Communist Party National Congress and the Qualification Review Committee. In the meeting, it was decided that Wang Huning would serve as the secretary-general of the party congress. On the same day, the presidium of the National Congress, chaired by Wang Huning, held its first session.

== The Congress ==
=== 16 October ===
On 16 October, Premier Li Keqiang announced the opening of the conference. Subsequently, Xi gave the political report titled "Hold High the Great Banner of Socialism with Chinese Characteristics and Work Together for the Comprehensive Construction of a Modern Socialist Country" on behalf of the 19th Central Committee. The speech lasted for around 104 minutes, roughly half of his speech in the 19th Congress. During the speech, Xi said:

Marxism is the fundamental guiding ideology upon which our party and our country are founded and thrive. Our experience has taught us that, at the fundamental level, we owe the success of our party and socialism with Chinese characteristics to the fact that Marxism works, particularly when it is adapted to the Chinese context and the needs of our times. The sound theoretical guidance of Marxism is the source from which our party draws its firm belief and conviction and which enables our party to seize the historical initiative. . . . With new changes and practical demands emerging both in and outside of China since the 18th National Congress, there was an urgent need for us to provide in-depth theoretical and practical answers to a series of epochal questions on the cause of the party and the country as well as the party’s governance of China. With the courage to make theoretical explorations and innovations, our party has, from an entirely new perspective, deepened its understanding of the laws that underlie governance by a communist party, the development of socialism, and the evolution of human society. It has achieved major theoretical innovations, which are encapsulated in the Thought on Socialism with Chinese Characteristics for a New Era.

He criticized the state of the CCP before he took office, summarizing that period:

Great achievements had been secured. . . . At the same time, however, a number of prominent issues and problems—some of which had been building for years and others which were just emerging—demanded urgent action. Inside the party, there were many issues with respect to upholding the party’s leadership, including a lack of clear understanding and effective action as well as a slide toward weak, hollow, and watered-down party leadership in practice. Some party members and officials were wavering in their political conviction. Despite repeated warnings, pointless formalities, bureaucratism, hedonism, and extravagance persisted in some localities and departments. Privilege-seeking mindsets and practices posed a serious problem, and some deeply shocking cases of corruption had been uncovered.

Xi also said in his report:

Ten years ago ... There were many problems of having a vague understanding of upholding the party's leadership and lack of action, and there were many problems of weakening, falsifying, and diluting the implementation of the party's leadership, and some party members and cadres had shaken their political beliefs ... some people lacked confidence in the socialist political system with Chinese characteristics ... money worship and hedonism, wrong thoughts such as extreme individualism and historical nihilism appeared from time to time, and online public sphere was chaotic, which seriously affected people's thinking and social public opinion environment ... there were many weaknesses in the modernization of national defense and the military; the institutional mechanisms for implementing "one country, two systems" in Hong Kong and Macau was not perfect; national security was facing severe challenges, and so on. At that time, many people in the party and society were worried about the future of the party and the country.

Xi defended China's zero-COVID approach to the COVID-19 pandemic, said that Hong Kong had "a major transition from chaos to governance", advocated for Taiwan's "peaceful reunification" but vowed to not renounce the use of force, advocated for "common prosperity," and denounced corruption. Xi reaffirmed China's socialist market economy, including the "Two Unwaverings," meaning support for both state ownership and the private sector economy. He also spoke of enacting policies to boost China's birth rate, which is among the lowest in the world. Additionally, he emphasized China's national security, including food, energy, and supply chain safety. Xi outlined the "Chinese path to modernization", mentioning the slogan 11 times. On China's position on the world stage, he said that "China's international influence, appeal and power to shape the world has significantly increased". Overall, the speech was said to be showing continuity rather than change.

=== 17–22 October ===
The second meeting of the Presidium was held on 18 October, presided by Xi. The meeting decided to submit draft resolutions on the 19th Central Committee's and 19th CCDI's reports as well as the amendment to the CCP Constitution. It also adopted proposed lists of preliminary nominees for the 20th Central Committee and the 20th CCDI. The draft name lists for both were approved during the third meeting of the Presidium, held on 21 October. On 22 October, the National Congress adopted the work reports of the 19th Central Committee and the 19th Central Commission for Discipline Inspection. It also adopted the proposed amendments to the CCP Constitution, and elected members of the 20th Central Committee and the 20th Central Commission for Discipline Inspection. Official voting results showed that all proposals passed unanimously with no abstentions or negative votes. The National Congress concluded that day.

At the closing ceremony on 22 October, Hu Jintao, the former General Secretary of the CCP and President, who had been sitting next to Xi, was pulled from his seat and escorted out of the hall by two men in suits and with name badges. This incident occurred before the votes that day, and Hu was absent from the voting due to this incident. Xinhua News Agency, China's official press agency, stated that Hu was not feeling well, while foreign news speculated whether Hu was genuinely sick or whether this was a deliberate political signal by Xi. The incident was not broadcast in China and both Hu's and Hu's son's names were blocked by Chinese censors. Academics Steve Tsang and Olivia Cheung write that the ban on images and reporting of the incident suggests that Xi did not intend to humiliate Hu.

=== First plenary session ===
Xi Jinping and other members of the 20th Politburo Standing Committee meeting the press, October 2022

The first plenary session of the 20th Central Committee, to elect the central party leadership, was held immediately after the Congress, CCP General Secretary Xi Jinping was appointed for an unprecedented third term as party leader. The newly elected members of the 20th Politburo Standing Committee in addition to Xi were, in their orders of precedence:

- Li Qiang (born 1959) – seen as a close ally of Xi, Li has been the Party secretary of Shanghai since 2017 and has since succeeded Li Keqiang as Chinese premier in 2023. Seen as business-friendly, he nonetheless gained criticism for his handling of the two-month lockdown of Shanghai due to a coronavirus outbreak.
- Zhao Leji (born 1957) – previously the 6th-ranking member of the PSC and secretary of the CCDI, Zhao has since succeeded Li Zhanshu as the chairman of the Standing Committee of the National People's Congress.
- Wang Huning (born 1955) – previously the 5th-ranking member of the PSC and first-ranking member of the CCP Secretariat, Wang has since succeeded Wang Yang as the chairman of the Chinese People's Political Consultative Conference. Seen as a close advisor of Xi, he is considered to be behind the ideological concepts of Xi and previous CCP general secretaries Jiang Zemin and Hu Jintao.
- Cai Qi (born 1955) – serving as the Party secretary of Beijing since 2017, Cai became the first-ranking member of the CCP Secretariat. He is considered to be a close ally of Xi.
- Ding Xuexiang (born 1962) – serving as the director of the CCP General Office, Ding was effectively Xi's chief of staff since 2017. He is a close ally of Xi and has since succeeded Han Zheng as the first vice premier.
- Li Xi (born 1956) – serving as the CCP committee secretary of Guangdong since 2017, Li became the secretary of the CCDI, succeeding Zhao Leji. He is considered to have connections to Xi.

The new PSC was filled almost completely with people close to Xi, with four out of the seven members of the previous PSC including Premier Li Keqiang and CPPCC Chairman Wang Yang stepping down. The only remaining members of the previous PSC except Xi were Zhao Leji and Wang Huning, though their ranking and positions changed. Reuters remarked that the retirement of Wang Yang and Li Keqiang, as well as the demotion of vice premier Hu Chunhua from the Politburo meant the wipeout of Tuanpai, while Willy Wo-Lap Lam wrote that there were no representatives from the Tuanpai or the Shanghai clique, leading to a total dominance of Xi's own faction.

== Policy changes ==
=== Party Constitution amendments ===
The Congress saw several amendments to the CCP Constitution. The additions included stating the CCP will "resolutely oppose and contain Taiwan independence, and to promote peace and fair and just development". Other additions included developing a "fighting spirit" and strengthening fighting ability, as well as additions of goals related to Xi, including gradually achieving common prosperity, promoting Chinese-style modernization and developing a "broader, fuller and more robust" whole-process people's democracy. The status of Xi and the CCP were further strengthened with the amendments, with the amended constitution declaring the party to be the "supreme political leadership force" and calling for safeguarding the status of Xi Jinping as the core of the CCP and safeguarding the centralized authority of the party.

=== Economy ===
The Congress emphasized that the CCP's economic agenda should focus on quality of growth, rather than solely quantity, consistent with principles of security and common prosperity. The importance of growing the digital economy was also emphasized. The 20th National Congress further highlighted ecological civilization as a core developmental goal of the CCP.

== Reaction ==
=== Countries ===
- North Korea: The Workers' Party of Korea general secretary Kim Jong Un sent a congratulatory letter to Xi Jinping on the Party Congress and his reelection as CCP general secretary, saying the Congress represented a "significant landmark" for the CCP and the Chinese people "in propelling the historic process of the Chinese nation's great prosperity under the banner of the socialist idea with the Chinese characteristics in the new era", and saying he hoped to further develop their ties.
- Russia: President Vladimir Putin congratulated Xi on his reelection, saying the Congress "fully confirms your high political authority, as well as the unity of the party you lead", and saying that he was confident Xi's reelection would "strengthen China's position in the international arena".
- Taiwan: Shortly after Xi Jinping's opening speech in which he stated that the People's Republic of China would never renounce the option of conducting military operations against Taiwan, the Office of the President of Taiwan issued a statement in which it said it would not compromise on either its sovereignty or democracy. The Kuomintang, on the other hand, congratulated Xi Jinping on his reelection as CCP general secretary.
- Vietnam: The Communist Party of Vietnam general secretary Nguyễn Phú Trọng sent a congratulatory message to Xi, saying he had full confidence that under the leadership of Xi, "the entire Party and all Chinese people will definitely fulfill the goals set forth by the 20th National Congress, soon successfully realize the basic goal of completing socialist modernization, and move towards building China into a modern, prosperous, democratic, civilized, harmonious and beautiful socialist country". He also praised Xi for his "great contributions to the Vietnam-China relationship for the benefit of the people of the two countries". Nguyễn later visited China from 30 October to 2 November, becoming the first foreign leader to visit China after the National Congress.

=== Stock markets ===
Stocks related to Chinese corporations suffered major losses on 24 October, with the Hang Seng Index falling 6%, its worst daily decline since the 2008 financial crisis. The Shanghai Stock Exchange only declined by 2% after the meeting. The renminbi also nearly fell to a rate of 7.31 to the dollar. The Golden Dragon China Index, an index of multiple Chinese companies listed on American exchanges, fell 14% in its worst daily drop since 2004, before partially rebounding a day later.

== See also ==
- General secretaryship of Xi Jinping
- Succession of power in China
