= Resolution on Certain Questions in the History of Our Party =

Chinese Communist Party document

The Resolution on Certain Questions in the History of Our Party (Chinese: 关于若干历史问题的决议) is a document adopted by the 6th Central Committee of the Chinese Communist Party (CCP) on its Seventh Plenary Session on 20 April 1945. A seven-member special committee consisting of Liu Shaoqi, Zhou Enlai and others was responsible for drafting and revising it. The document summarized the lessons of political movements since the founding of the CCP, especially the period from the Fourth Plenary Session of the 6th Central Committee to the Zunyi Conference.

== Drafting ==
The Resolution was formed against the backdrop of the Yan'an Rectification Movement, which was launched by Mao Zedong after the fall of 1942. At the enlarged meeting of the Politburo in March 1943, Mao Zedong was elected Chairman of the CCP, officially ascending to Party's leadership. Afterwards, Mao instructed to review the history of the CCP since 1928. On May 21, 1944, the first plenary meeting of the enlarged Seventh Plenary Session of the 6th Central Committee was held in Yan'an. Mao Zedong delivered a work report on behalf of the Politburo, proposing six principles and guiding opinions on handling the party's historical issues. Then, the Preparatory Committee for the Resolution on Certain Questions in the History of Our Party, chaired by Ren Bishi and attended by Liu Shaoqi, Kang Sheng, Zhou Enlai, Zhang Wentian, Peng Zhen, Gao Gang, and Bo Gu, began to draft the Resolution based on Mao's Draft on Historical Issues written in 1942. On April 20, 1945, the Eighth Plenary Session approved the Resolution on Certain Questions in the History of Our Party and included the resolution in the 1945 volume of the Selected Documents of the CPC Central Committee.

At the eighth meeting of the plenary session, Ren Bishi spoke on behalf of the presidium of the plenary session, saying that the historical resolution mainly addressed the issues from the Fourth Plenary Session of the 6th Central Committee to the Zunyi Conference; the principle for resolving historical issues was to analyze the content and root causes of the mistakes, rather than focusing on individual responsibility.

== Content ==
The resolution meant to summarize the lessons of political movements under the CCP since its founding especially the period from the Fourth Plenary Session of the 6th Central Committee to the Zunyi Conference. The resolution drew conclusions on a number of historical issues in the 20 years since the founding of the CCP, including Chen Duxiu's "rightist opportunism", Qu Qiubai and Li Lisan's "leftist blind activism", and Wang Ming's "leftist dogmatism". According to the document, each of the leftist and rightist deviation were not accidental, but the product of certain social and historical conditions.

== See also ==
- Ideology of the Chinese Communist Party
- Resolution on Certain Questions in the History of Our Party since the Founding of the People's Republic of China
- Resolution on the Major Achievements and Historical Experience of the Party over the Past Century
