= Chinese Empire =

Name for Imperial China

Approximate territorial extent of various dynasties and states in China from 2070 BC to 1820 AD.

The Chinese Empire (traditional Chinese: 中華帝國; simplified Chinese: 中华帝国; pinyin: Zhōnghuá Dìguó), or the Empire of China, refers to the realm ruled by the Emperor of China during the era of Imperial China. The term was coined by western scholars to describe the Ming and Qing dynasties, and it may also refer to imperial Chinese dynasties in general. Another term was the "Celestial Empire", in reference to the status of the emperor as the Son of Heaven. In 221 BC, China was unified under an emperor for the first time, and various imperial dynasties ruled China for a total of two millennia since then, including the Qin, Han, Jin, Sui, Tang, Song, Yuan, Ming, and Qing, among others.

== Etymology and usage ==
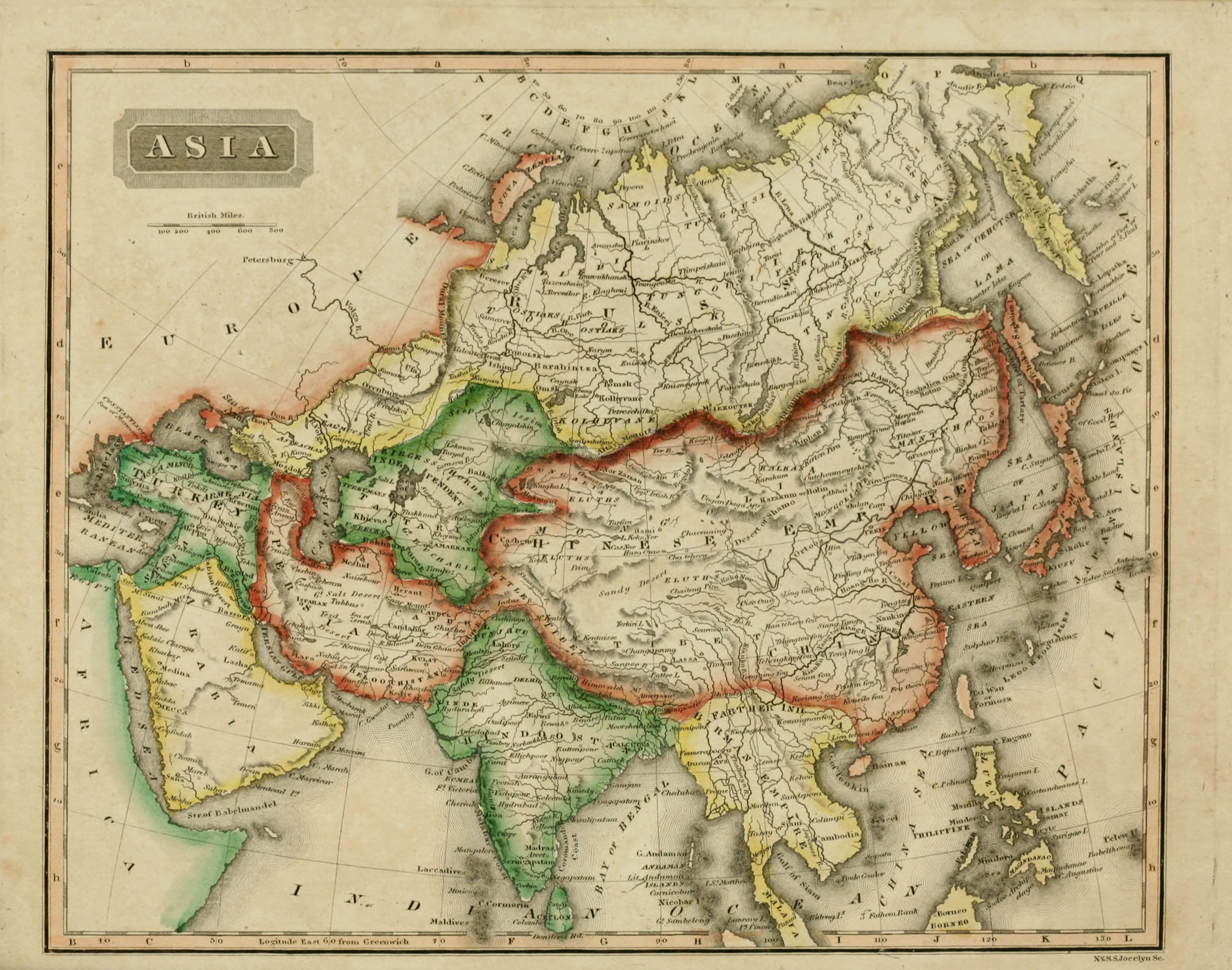
A 1825 map showing the Chinese Empire and other Asian regions.

A 1840 map showing the Chinese Empire and Japan.

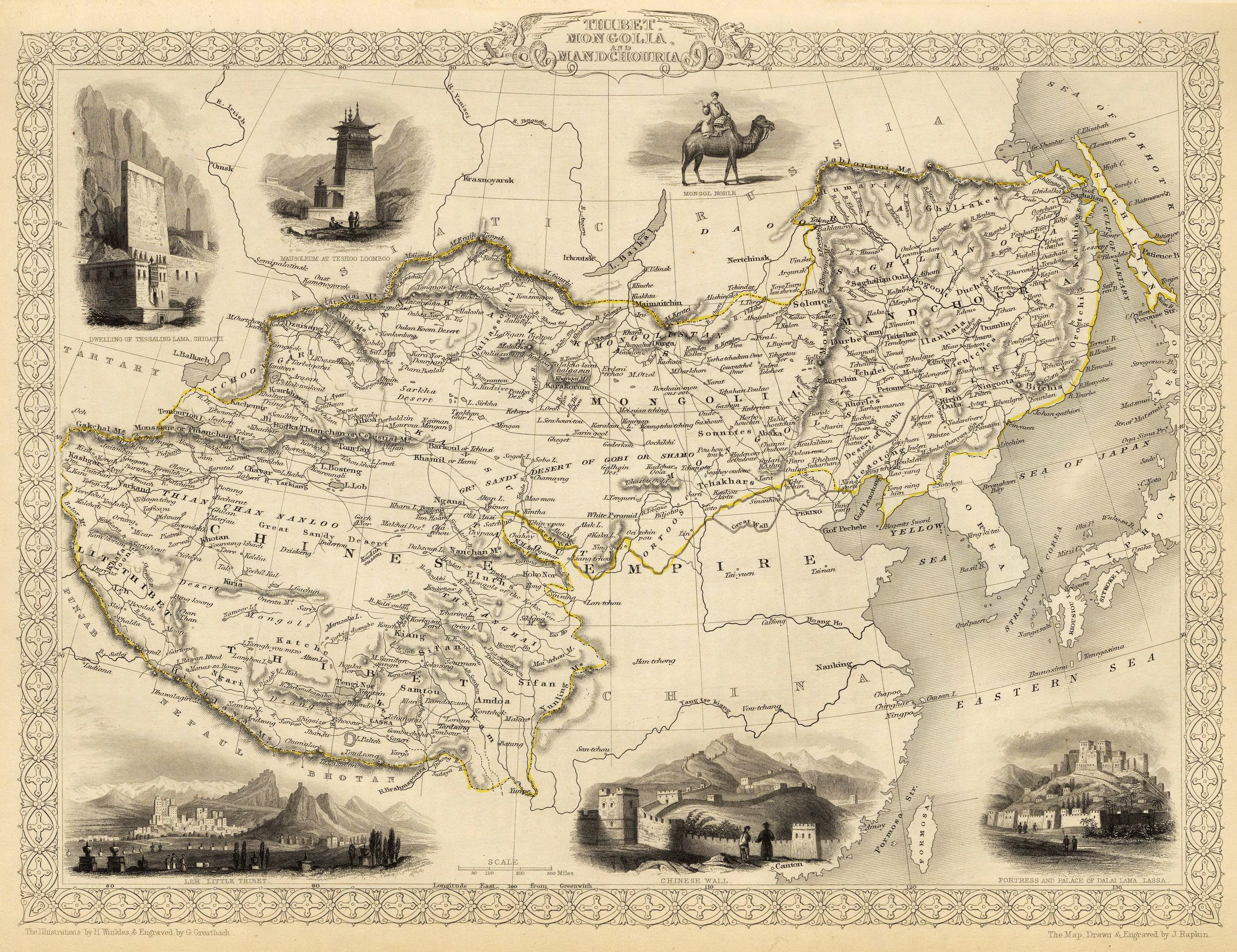
A 1851 map showing the Inner Asian dependencies of the Chinese Empire.

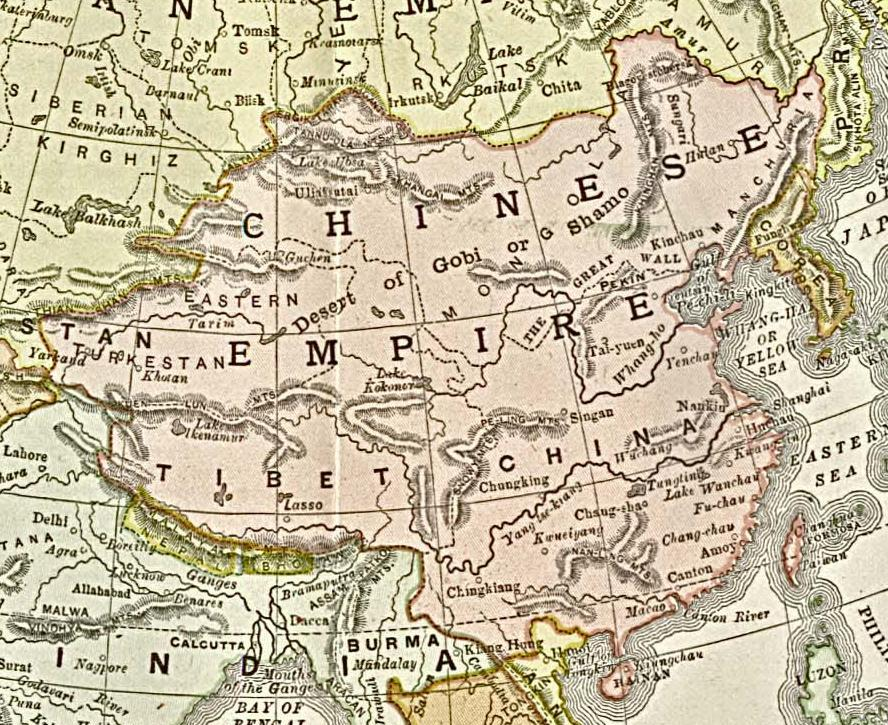
A 1890 map showing Qing China (labeled "Chinese Empire").

The word "China" has been used in English since the 16th century. China was previously known to Europeans as Cathay, as used in Marco Polo's book on his travels in the 13th century (during the Yuan dynasty), and it took a while for most Europeans to be convinced that Cathay referred to China or North China. The term "Chinese Empire" first appeared in the 16th century (late Ming dynasty), and its usage increased during the following Qing dynasty.

=== Ming dynasty ===
As European explorers came into direct contact with the Ming dynasty (1368–1644) of China during their voyages in the early 16th century, the European intellectual community began to update its concept of the Chinese political system. Initially however the vast majority of them considered Ming China a kingdom rather than an empire. It appeared that it was Maximilianus Transylvanus who first considered China an empire in his work. In 1585, Juan González de Mendoza pointed out that Ming China was at the imperial level based on the multi-level system of the tribute system. Afterwards, Europeans like Matteo Ricci, Álvaro Semedo, Martino Martini and Philippe Couplet gradually constructed the name "Chinese Empire" by comparing the empire-kingdom level, translating European and Chinese concepts and constructing genealogies. However, popular adoption was a slow process. Even the 1615 book De Christiana expeditione apud Sinas by Matteo Ricci (one of the founding figures of the Jesuit China missions) more often referred to Ming China as a kingdom than an empire. By the last decade of the Ming dynasty though, an increasing number of Europeans began to refer to the Ming dynasty as "Chinese Empire".

=== Qing dynasty ===
With the transition from Ming to Qing, Europeans began to apply the name "Chinese Empire" to the Qing dynasty (1644–1912). "Chinese Empire" (or "Empire of China") was commonly used during the Qing period, most notably in the western maps and international treaties. The Tsardom of Russia began official communications with the Qing dynasty in the 1650s, and Russian documents from that period referred to Qing China as "Empire of China", "Chinese state" or the state of Bogda. In the 1689 Treaty of Nerchinsk, the authoritative Latin text used the name "Imperii Sinici" (meaning "Chinese Empire") to refer to the Qing realm. George Macartney, the first envoy of Great Britain to China in 1793, had famously said "the Empire of China is an old, crazy, first-rate Man of War, which a fortunate succession of able and vigilant officers have contrived to keep afloat for these hundred and fifty years past..." shortly after his mission to China. While the Qing dynasty tried to maintain the traditional Chinese tributary system, by the second half of the 19th century it had become part of a European-style community of sovereign states. In the process, Qing dynasty's geographical boundaries were redefined by western powers and Japan through diplomacy and warfare. The Qing administration made an effort to effectively manage its borders while modernizing itself, and its dependencies in Inner Asia (collectively known as Chinese Tartary at that time) were internalized and integrated into China's imperial dominion as accepted by the western countries. Throughout the 19th century, western cartographers commonly included Manchuria, Mongolia, Xinjiang (Chinese Turkestan), and Tibet, along with China proper separated by lines, as part of the "Chinese Empire" in published maps. In the last decade of the Qing dynasty, maps published in China caught up with Western cartography, and China's Inner Asian frontiers were enclosed by fixed international boundaries and not separated from China proper by special demarcations.

=== Continuous or separate empire(s) ===
While the term "Chinese Empire" may be used to specifically mean the Ming or the Qing dynasties during the existence of these dynasties, it was often used in a sense to refer to a continuous empire ruled by various dynasties in Chinese history, as the traditional Chinese historiography conceives its history in terms of an unbroken sequence of dynasties (see dynastic cycle). For example, when Juan González de Mendoza talked about ancient China in his work in the late 16th century, he clearly stated in three places that the first (mythical) sovereign of China, the Yellow Emperor, made the Chinese kingdom an empire; since China was already an empire during the time of the Yellow Emperor, all dynasties from then on were regarded as the continuation of the "empire". According to Matteo Ricci's view of "imperial power transfer", the name of the empire had not changed since ancient times, but it often had other names due to different ruling families; for instance, the name of "German Empire" would never change, but when the Austrian family ruled, it could also be called "Austrian Empire". Likewise, according to the newspaper New York Herald published in 1853, "during four thousand and sixty years, twenty-one dynasties have swayed the destines of the Chinese Empire, embracing, besides the present sovereign, two hundred and twenty Emperors, whose average reigns have been nearly nineteen years each".

On the other hand, modern scholars usually consider the imperial dynasties separate states or empires rather than a single continuous empire, especially since the end of Imperial China. Meanwhile, the English term "Emperor" nowadays generally corresponds to the Chinese term Huangdi (皇帝), also referred to as Emperor of China. For example, the Qin dynasty, which was the first to use the title Emperor or Huangdi, has been referred to as "the first Chinese Empire" in modern sources. On the other hand, the Qing dynasty is regarded as the last Chinese Empire. The dynasties in between them are similarly regarded as empires instead of a single continuous empire, and terms such as "Sui-Tang transition" and "Ming-Qing transition" were introduced in the second half of the 20th century to highlight the changes during transitions of these periods, While imperial dynasties are no longer considered a single empire, some dynasties may be grouped together by some scholars, such as the Qin and the Han dynasty that followed, collectively called the "Qin-Han Empire" by some researchers. Taken together, these two dynasties constitute the "classical" era of Chinese civilization, as did the Greeks and Romans in the West.

== General history ==
The period of Imperial China lasted more than two millennia, connecting ancient and modern history. Although Chinese dynasties or empires rose and fell during those centuries, including during periods of strife and war, Imperial China endured with remarkable constancy. The defining characteristics of all Chinese empires were their large scale and the diversity of their peoples.

Originally emerged as a loose collection of various Han Chinese-speaking entities during the Warring States period, the Qin's wars of unification brought most of the Huaxia realm into one single dynasty, establishing Qin as the first imperial dynasty in 221 BC, the year where the first Chinese empire was established. Imperial China would continue to expand even after the collapse of the Qin dynasty, with the Han dynasty expanding to the north, south and west. During the Tang dynasty four centuries later, China achieved a golden age in terms of its economic, military and political power. Tang's territory spanned Central Asia, Northeast Asia and parts of Southeast Asia, until the dynasty ended following the An Lushan rebellion in the eighth century. Imperial China marked its revival under the Mongol-based Yuan dynasty, when Inner Asian territories such as Tibet and Mongolia were incorporated. The Qing dynasty, founded three centuries after the fall of the Yuan dynasty, laid ground to most of China's modern border with its re-expansion into Inner Asia.

One year after the 1911 Revolution, the Qing monarchy was abolished following the abdication of the Xuantong Emperor (Puyi), thus putting an end to the era of Imperial China. Three years later, Yuan Shikai restored imperial rule with himself as the emperor. It lasted only 83 days before his own abdication due to mounting disapproval and revolts as well as Yuan's declining health. In July 1917, Puyi was reinstalled by Zhang Xun but the restoration was reversed in less than two weeks.

== See also ==
- Chinoiserie
- Pax Sinica
- Sinosphere
- Chinese uniformity
- Mandate of Heaven
- Tributary system of China
- Chinese Empire Reform Association
