= Two Unwaverings =

Chinese Communist Party slogan

The Two Unwaverings (Chinese: 两个毫不动摇; pinyin: Liǎng gè háo bù dòngyáo) is a Chinese Communist Party (CCP) political slogan that refers to the stated goal of "unwaveringly consolidating and developing the public sector of the economy" and "unwaveringly encouraging, supporting and guiding the development of the non-public sector of the economy".

== History ==
In 2002, the report of the 16th National Congress of the Chinese Communist Party first proposed the need to adhere to the "two unwaverings". In 2013, the Third Plenary Session of the 18th CCP Central Committee pointed out that CCP must continue to adhere to the "two unwaverings". It further proposed both the public economy and the non-public economy are important components of the socialist market economy and are important foundations for China's economic and social development.

In 2022, the report of the 20th Party National Congress proposed that "we should build a high-level socialist market economic system, adhere to and improve the basic socialist economic system, unswervingly consolidate and develop the public economy, unswervingly encourage, support and guide the development of the non-public economy, give full play to the decisive role of the market in resource allocation, and better play the role of the government." The slogan was codified into law with the Private Sector Promotion Law in 2025.
