= Chinese uniformity =

Chinese traditional political concept

Chinese uniformity (Chinese: 大一統; lit. 'grand uniformity') is a term referring to the traditional phenomenon and ideology of cultural uniformity and political unification in the Chinese history. Since the Western Zhou dynasty (c. 1046 BC–771 BC) there has been a trend of uniformity in various aspects of life in the Greater China, including the uniformity of cultural identity, uniformity of the calendar, the uniformity of decrees, the uniformity of thought, the uniformity of etiquette, the uniformity of metrology, and the uniformity of writing system among the autonomous regional states.

The Qin dynasty (221 BC–206 BC) was the first imperial Chinese dynasty to reign over a unified China following its wars of unification, and the standardization of writing scripts, currencies and measurement systems during the reign of the First Emperor further cemented the uniformity, which was inherited and continued by the subsequent Han dynasty after Qin's collapse. Since then, China has a long history of a unified empire in addition to a common culture and traditions shared by many Chinese. Confucianism became China's official ideology in education and court politics during the Han dynasty since Emperor Wu. Even though Chinese people spoke a variety of dialects, the literate classes shared a written language known as the Classical Chinese, and an examination system based on Chinese classics served as the main path to official positions since the Sui dynasty.

== See also ==
- Chinese Empire
- Mandate of Heaven
- Dynasties of China
- Dynastic cycle
- Zhonghua minzu
