= Qualification Review Committee of the 20th National Congress of the Chinese Communist Party =

Seam Hossain

The Qualification Review Committee of the 20th National Congress of the Chinese Communist Party was elected by congress delegates in a preparatory meeting before the convening of the congress.

In October 2022, Zhao Leji, the sitting Secretary of the Central Commission for Discipline Inspection, was elected Chairman of the Qualification Review Committee while Chen Xi and Miao Hua were elected as deputy chairs.

== Members ==
Members of the Qualification Review Committee of the 20th National Congress
Name	Hanzi	Birth	Electoral unit	Ethnicity	Gender	Status	Ref.
Zhao Leji	赵乐际	1957	Inner Mongolia	Han	Male	Active	
Chen Xi	陈希	1953	Ningxia	Han	Male	Active	
Miao Hua	苗华	1955	Army and Police	Han	Male	Active	
Wang Chengnan	王成男	1964	Army and Police	Han	Male	Active	
Wang Xiaohui	王晓晖	1962	Sichuan	Han	Male	Active	
Yin Li	尹力	1962	Fujian	Han	Male	Active	
Erkin Tuniyaz	艾尔肯·吐尼亚孜	1961	Xinjiang	Uyghur	Male	Active	
Liu Jinguo	刘金国	1955	Central State Organs	Han	Male	Active	
Wu Hansheng	吴汉圣	1963	Central State Organs	Han	Male	Active	
Qiu Yong	邱勇	1964	Beijing	Han	Male	Active	
Zhang Qingwei	张庆伟	1961	Hanan	Han	Male	Active	
Zhang Guoqing	张国清	1959	Liaoning	Han	Male	Active	
Chen Gang	陈刚	1965	Central State Organs	Han	Male	Active	
Zhao Zhihao	赵志浩	1931	Shandong	Han	Male	Retired	
Hao Peng	郝鹏	1960	Central Enterprise System	Han	Male	Active	
Jiang Xinzhi	姜信治	1958	Central State Organs	Han	Male	Active	
Losang Jamcan	洛桑江村	1957	Tibet	Tibetan	Male	Active	
He Junke	贺军科	1969	Central State Organs	Han	Male	Active	
Yuan Jie	袁洁	1965	Central Enterprise System	Han	Male	Active	
Huang Xiaowei	黄晓薇	1961	Central State Organs	Han	Female	Active	
Liang Yanshun	梁言顺	1962	Ningxia	Han	Male	Active	
Lou Yangsheng	楼阳生	1959	Henan	Han	Male	Active	

== See also ==
- 20th National Congress of the Chinese Communist Party
- Organization of the Chinese Communist Party
