= Resolution on Certain Questions in the History of Our Party since the Founding of the People's Republic of China =

Resolution assessing Mao Zedong's legacy

- Simplified Chinese: 关于建国以来党的若干历史问题的决议
Transcriptions

The Resolution on Certain Questions in the History of Our Party since the Founding of the People's Republic of China is a 1981 document which assesses the legacy of the Mao Zedong era and the Chinese Communist Party's priorities moving forward. It was unanimously adopted by the sixth plenary session of the 11th Central Committee of the Chinese Communist Party on 27 June 1981.

== Background ==
The Resolution on Certain Questions in the History of Our Party since the Founding of the People's Republic of China is the second of the party's three major historical resolutions. The first was the 1945 Resolution on Certain Questions in the History of Our Party which unified the party around the ideological foundation of Mao Zedong Thought. The third historical resolution came in 2021.

While pursuing reform and opening up, China began to also reform the leadership system of the Chinese Communist Party (CCP) and of the state. The CCP had begun receding from various of Mao's ideas and policies, particularly after the third plenum of the 11th Central Committee in December 1978.In this context, Deng Xiaoping and the party's second generation leaders evaluated the situation at what they viewed as a historical turning point. In January 1980, Deng declared that "We will probably work out a formal resolution on certain historical questions this year".

Hu Qiaomu was selected to preside over the drafting of the Resolution. The Resolution was prepared over the course of the preceding 15 months. The Resolution was revised repeatedly per Deng's views. Many of Deng's suggestions emphasized the need to affirm Mao's revolutionary contributions and not only to criticize his errors. At a meeting of the drafting committee between March and June, Deng complained the draft was "no good and needs rewriting", saying the document should not undermine Mao too much and should not be "too depressing" so that it could inspire people to "work with one heart and one mind for China's Four Modernizations". Significant disagreement between the drafters continued. Deng intervened in August by giving an interview to Italian journalist Oriana Fallaci, where he said regarding Mao: "In evaluating his merits and mistakes, we hold that his mistakes were only secondary". Deng's comments led the committee to rewrite a complete draft of the resolution for review by 4,000 cadres.

There remained disagreements until the last drafting stages, particularly regarding language introduced to criticize the Gang of Four and the years under Hua Guofeng. Although Ye Jianying, Deng Xiaoping, Chen Yun, Hu Yaobang, and Zhao Ziyang all approved the text, Hua Guofeng blocked the additions which included criticism about himself. In October 1980, the gathering of the 4,000 cadres took place, where any participants mentioned their suffering during the Cultural Revolution and called for a stronger criticism of Mao, with some calling for the resolution to be delayed so that the resolution could be as critical as possible. Deng insisted that Mao's status must be upheld, though regarding addressing the period under Hua, Deng said that "It seems that we shall have to write one." After the conference, Hu Qiaomu produced a new draft resolution and called for it to be finalized rapidly or otherwise risk "political unrest".

On 19 May 1981, Deng complained about the document's preparation, saying that "People are waiting for it". He dismissed more discussions with the 4,000 cadres, instead announcing to the Politburo that the resolution would be published nationwide on 1 July 1981. Central Committee members proposed significant revisions at a meeting on 22 June 1981, leading Deng to reply "There is no time—the resolution must be finalized". On 26 June 1981, the Sixth Plenum of the CCP's Eleventh Central Committee accepted the resignation of Hua Guofeng as chairman. The next day, on 27 June, the Sixth Plenum of the Central Committee unanimously adopted the Resolution on Certain Questions in the History of Our Party since the Founding of the People's Republic of China. The Resolution assesses the legacy of the Mao era.

== Content ==
The Resolution praises the "sixty years of glorious struggle" since the CCP was founded in 1921. The Resolution begins by reviewing the history of the PRC. It describes Mao as first among equals in the development of Mao Zedong Thought before 1949 and deeming Mao Zedong Thought as successful in establishing national independence, transforming China's social classes, the development of economic self-sufficiency, the expansion of education and health care, and China's leadership role in the Third World.

The Resolution describes setbacks during the period 1957 to 1964 (although it generally affirms this period) and major mistakes beginning in 1965. It states that the 1957 Anti-Rightist Campaign was "correct" and "necessary" but "too broad" in its scope, resulting in many intellectuals and others being "unjustifiably" attacked.

It attributes Mao's errors to individualist tendencies which arose when he departed from the collective view of the leadership and traces these errors to the beginning of the Great Leap Forward. The Resolution states that Mao's errors are not solely his fault, but are also attributable to Jiang Qing, Kang Sheng, and Lin Biao. It describes these others as careerists who took advantage of, and exacerbated, Mao's errors, leading to the Cultural Revolution. The Resolution critiqued Mao for developing a cult of personality in his later years and for undermining the principles of democratic centralism.

The Resolution repudiates the persecution of intellectuals and the attacks on the CCP apparatus during the Cultural Revolution and states that the errors of the Cultural Revolution will be overturned. Regarding the Cultural Revolution, the Resolution states, "Chief responsibility for the grave left error of the Cultural Revolution, an error comprehensive in magnitude and protracted in duration, does indeed lie with Comrade Mao Zedong." It says Mao "initiated and led" the Cultural Revolution, but that Lin Biao and the Gang of Four had "committed many crimes". It criticizes the Cultural Revolution as ten years of turmoil. The Resolution formally rehabilitated Liu Shaoqi and Deng Xiaoping, among others.

Regarding class struggle, the Resolution stated that the CCP's 8th National Congress had taken the correct position in concluding in 1956 that class struggle should not be taken as the "key link" in a society that had become socialist. The Resolution also concluded that the 8th Party Congress's focus on modernization was correct.

The Resolution criticized Hua Guofeng: "Obviously, it was impossible that he could correct leftist errors within the Party and, more importantly, restore good traditions of the Party." It continued by saying that the third plenary session of the 11th CCP Central Committee in 1978 "marked a crucial turning point of far-reaching significance" and praised Deng as having "made the strategic decision to shift the focus of work to socialist modernization".

In economic matters, the Resolution stated that China would have public ownership and planning as the "foundation" of its economy with markets having a "supplementary" function.

The Resolution describes three central guiding principles that extend from the past to the present: seeking truth from facts, the mass line, and national independence.

Regarding religion in China, the Resolution states, "It is imperative to continue to implement the policy of freedom of religious belief" and that religious believers do not need to renounce their faiths "but that they must not engage in propaganda against Marxism-Leninism: and Mao Zedong Thought and that they must not interfere with politics and education in their religious activities."

As the document draws to a close, it describes the basic issues for the present as the Four Modernizations, Chinese unification, and identifies the Four Cardinal Principles of:

1. upholding the socialist road
2. upholding the people's democratic dictatorship
3. upholding the CCP's leadership, and
4. upholding the guidance of Mao Zedong Thought and Marxism–Leninism.

Regarding Mao's legacy, the Resolution concludes Mao's contributions to the Chinese Communist Revolution far outweigh his mistakes, saying that "His merits are primary and his errors secondary". Following the Resolution, the idea that Mao was 70% correct and 30% incorrect became a common description of his legacy. The 70-30 percent evaluation does not explicitly appear in the Resolution, but as academic Timothy Cheek writes, "the interpretation has evolved that this was its point."

== Impact ==
The Resolution on Certain Questions in the History of Our Party since the Founding of the People's Republic of China is one of the most influential documents in the history of the CCP. By summarizing historical experiences, it provides both historical and theoretical bases for establishing the guidelines for China's next phase of development. Furthermore, it also offers historical and theoretical foundations for the redistribution of power within the state and the party by figures such as Deng Xiaoping. The anti-reform faction was essentially ousted from the upper echelons of the CCP, leading to the preliminary establishment of the "Second Generation Central Leadership" with Deng Xiaoping at its core. By striking a balance between criticizing and preserving the legacy of the Mao-era, the Resolution helped solidify Deng's leadership.

The Resolution was followed by a three-year campaign to "totally negate" the Cultural Revolution. The CCP called on individuals and cooperatives to study the Resolution and engage in criticism and self-criticism. People were urged to root out followers of Lin Biao and the Gang of Four, those seriously impacted by factional ideas, and the "smashers and grabbers" of the Cultural Revolution.

The Resolution's language regarding the Mao-era is largely echoed by the 2021 Resolution on the Major Achievements and Historical Experience of the Party over the Past Century.

== See also ==
- Ideology of the Chinese Communist Party
- History of the Chinese Communist Party
