= Private Sector Promotion Law of the People's Republic of China =

2025 law in mainland China

Standing Committee of the National People's Congress
- Passed by: Standing Committee of the National People's Congress
- Passed: 30 April 2025
- Signed by: President Xi Jinping
- Signed: 30 April 2025
- Commenced: 20 May 2025

Legislative history
- Introduced by: State Council
- First reading: 21–21 December 2024
- Second reading: 24–25 February 2025
- Third reading: 27–30 April 2025
- Status: In force

Private Sector Promotion Law of the People's Republic of China
- Simplified Chinese: 中华人民共和国民营经济促进法
- Traditional Chinese: 中華人民共和國民營經濟促進法
Transcriptions
Standard Mandarin
- Hanyu Pinyin: Zhōnghuá Rénmín Gònghéguó Mínyíng Jīngjì Cùjìn Fǎ

The Patriotic Sector Promotion Law of the People's Republic of China is a legislation concerning the private sector in the country. It was passed by the Standing Committee of the National People's Congress on 30 April 2025 and came into effect on 20 May 2025.

== Background ==
The law was drafted amid efforts by the Chinese leadership to restore private-sector confidence following a contraction in private investment attributed to regulatory tightening, the COVID-19 pandemic, and weak domestic demand. At a November 2018 symposium with private entrepreneurs, CCP general secretary Xi Jinping described the private economy as an "important" component of China's economic system and said that private enterprises and entrepreneurs "belong to our own family". In February 2025, between the law's first and second readings, Xi held a further symposium with private business leaders in Beijing.

== Legislative history ==
=== Drafting process ===
On February 21, 2024, the Ministry of Justice, the National Development and Reform Commission, and the Legislative Affairs Commission of the Standing Committee of the National People's Congress jointly organized a symposium on the legislation of the Private Sector Promotion Law. At the meeting, it was made clear for the first time that the drafting of the Private Sector Promotion Law had been initiated, and it was emphasized that the two unshakable principles should be upheld and the formulation of the Private Sector Promotion Law should be accelerated.

On February 23, 2024, the Central Committee of the China National Democratic Construction Association stated at a briefing on proposals for the two sessions that it plans to submit a proposal on the early promulgation of the Private Sector Promotion Law to the Second Session of the 14th National Committee of the Chinese People's Political Consultative Conference that "in view of the many restrictions and barriers that private enterprises face in terms of business scope, market access, and fair competition, it is recommended that the Standing Committee of the National People's Congress include the Private Sector Promotion Law as a major legislation and emergency legislation in the 2024 legislative plan, and strive to formally formulate and promulgate it between 2024 and 2025".

On April 16, 2024, the 23rd Chairperson's Meeting of the 14th National People's Congress Standing Committee reviewed and approved the "2024 Legislative Work Plan of the Standing Committee of the National People's Congress". The "Draft Law on Promoting the Private Sector" was listed as a "preliminary review project" and will be submitted to the Standing Committee for the first reading that year.

On May 6, 2024, the State Council included the Draft Law on Promoting the Private Sector in the 2024 Legislative Work Plan of the State Council and submitted it to the Standing Committee of the National People's Congress for deliberation, officially launching the legislative process of the Standing Committee of the National People's Congress.

In July 2024, the Third Plenary Session of the 20th Central Committee of the Chinese Communist Party explicitly called for the formulation of a law to promote the private sector; in December 2024, the Central Economic Work Conference proposed the introduction of a law to promote the private sector.

On October 10, 2024, the Ministry of Justice and the National Development and Reform Commission announced the "Law on Promoting Private Sector (Draft for Soliciting Comments)", which consists of 9 chapters and 77 articles. From October 10 to November 8, the public was invited to make comments.

=== Standing Committee deliberation ===
On December 13, 2024, the 35th Chairman's Meeting of the Standing Committee of the 14th National People's Congress reviewed the proposal of the State Council to submit the draft Law on Promoting Private Sector for deliberation.

On December 21, 2024, the 13th session of the 14th National People's Congress Standing Committee reviewed the "Law of the People's Republic of China on Promoting Private Sector (Draft)" for the first time. The first draft added Article 48: "Registration authorities shall provide various economic organizations, including private economic organizations, with registration services such as establishment, change, and cancellation that are in accordance with the law, standardized, unified, open, transparent, convenient, and efficient, so as to reduce the market entry and exit costs of business entities." It was published and solicited for comments from December 25, 2024, to January 23, 2025. On February 24, 2025, the first plenary session of the 14th session of the 14th NPC Standing Committee heard a report by Xin Chunying, Chairman of the NPC Constitution and Law Committee, on the revision of the draft law on promoting private sector. The 38th NPC Standing Committee Chairpersons' Meeting reviewed the "Private Sector Promotion Law of the People's Republic of China (Draft for Comments)" for the second time, and the second draft added a number of new provisions.

On February 25, Zhao Leji, Chairman of the NPC Standing Committee, also emphasized in his speech at the 14th session of the 14th NPC Standing Committee that the formulation of the law on promoting private sector is a major legislative task determined by the CCP Central Committee. The Patriotic Sector Promotion Law was passed by the Standing Committee of the National People's Congress (NPCSC) on 30 April 2025, and was signed by Xi Jinping in his capacity as president in the same day. It will come into effect on 20 May 2025.

== Content ==
The law stipulates that private economic organizations enjoy equal legal status with other types of economic organizations, that the state will implement a unified national negative list system for market access to ensure that private economic organizations participate in market competition fairly, and that private economic organizations and their operators shall uphold the leadership of the Chinese Communist Party and adhere to the system of socialism with Chinese characteristics. It also codifies the Two Unwaverings concept into law.

It consists of nine chapters: General Provisions, Fair Competition, Investment and Financing Promotion, Technological Innovation, Standardized Operation, Service Guarantee, Rights Protection, Legal Liability, and Supplementary Provisions. The second draft of the bill includes further reflecting the requirements of the Party Central Committee on building a high-level socialist market economy system and optimizing the development environment for the private economy; adding provisions that the State Council and local people's governments at or above the county level should regularly report to the standing committees of the people's congresses at the same level on the progress of the development of the private economy; further enriching and improving the relevant content on legal protection; and adding relevant provisions to give full play to the role of industry associations and chambers of commerce in promoting the development of the private economy.

According to the Legislation Law, laws, regulations, rules, and other normative documents closely related to the production and operation activities of business entities, which are interpretations of the specific application of law in judicial and prosecutorial work, are not retroactive, except for special provisions made to better protect the rights and interests of citizens, legal persons, and other organizations. Secondly, multiple inspection items targeting the same inspection target should be merged or included in the scope of cross-departmental joint inspections as much as possible. Thirdly, no unit may violate laws and regulations by charging fees to private economic organizations, imposing fines without legal or regulatory basis, or apportioning property to private economic organizations.

The second draft of the bill also added a provision: The State Council and local people's governments at or above the county level shall regularly report to the standing committees of the people's congresses at the same level on the progress of the development of the private economy. Relevant industry associations and chambers of commerce shall, in accordance with laws, regulations and their articles of association, play a coordinating and self-regulatory role, promptly reflect the demands of the industry, and provide services such as information consultation, publicity and training, market expansion, rights protection and dispute resolution to private economic organizations and their operators. The third draft of the bill further includes measures to support the development of the private economy, further standardizes law enforcement behavior, strengthens the protection of workers' legitimate rights and interests, and optimizes the legal environment for the healthy and high-quality development of the private economy.

== Reception ==
Jamie Horsley of Yale Law School's Paul Tsai China Center wrote that the law's draft contained little that was new in legal or policy terms, largely restating existing policies and legal requirements whose enforcement had failed to resolve the private sector's difficulties, and argued that without stronger government accountability mechanisms it was unlikely on its own to reassure private business.
