= Dynastic cycle =

Political theory in the history of China

The dynastic cycle of the Chinese dynasties and the Mandate of Heaven.

Dynastic cycle (traditional Chinese: 朝代循環; simplified Chinese: 朝代循环; pinyin: Cháodài Xúnhuán) is an important political theory in the history of China. According to this theory, each dynasty of China rises to a political, cultural, and economic peak and then—because of moral corruption—declines, loses the Mandate of Heaven, falls, and is replaced by a new dynasty. The cycle then repeats under a surface pattern of repetitive motifs.

The theory sees a continuity in Chinese history from early times to the present, in the succession of empires or dynasties, which implies that there is little basic development or change in social or economic structures. John K. Fairbank expressed the doubts of many historians when he wrote that "the concept of the dynastic cycle ... has been a major block to the understanding of the fundamental dynamics of Chinese history", and that the only validity of it is "if one interprets it as a somewhat superficial political pattern that overlay the more fundamental technological, economic, social, and cultural developments."

== The cycle ==
The cycle is roughly as follows:

1. A new ruler founds a new dynasty, and is considered to have gained the Mandate of Heaven.
2. China, under the new dynasty, achieves prosperity.
3. The population increases.
4. Over time, corruption becomes rampant in the imperial court, and the empire begins to enter decline and instability.
5. A natural disaster wipes out agricultural lands. The disaster normally would not have been a problem; however, together with the corruption and overpopulation, it causes famine.
6. The famine causes the population to rebel and a civil war ensues.
7. The ruler is considered to have lost the Mandate of Heaven.
8. The population decreases because of the violence.
9. China's states declare war on one another.
10. One state emerges to be victorious.
11. The ruler of the victorious state assumes control of all China, and the cycle repeats.

The Mandate of Heaven was the idea that the monarch was favored by Heaven to rule over China. The Mandate of Heaven explanation was championed by the Chinese philosopher Mencius during the Warring States period.

It has 3 main phases:

1. The first is the beginning of the dynasty.
2. The second is at the middle of the dynasty's life and is the peak of the dynasty.
3. The last period is the decline of the dynasty, both politically and economically, until it finally collapses.

== Formation and significance ==
Chinese history is traditionally represented in terms of dynastic cycles. According to the Zhou, Yu the Great established the Xia dynasty because Heaven had given him the authority ages earlier. Heaven retracted its decree and gave it to the Shang instead of the Xia when a terrible monarch appeared among them. The Zhou asserted that Heaven was giving them the mandate since Shang rule had also degraded. The idea of a dynasty cycle would become essential to traditional Chinese political philosophy in later periods. While the Qin rejected the dynastic cycle model, some Han-period historians like Ban Gu re-embraced the dynastic model with works like the Book of Han, which were regarded as adhering to the correct historical framework established by Confucius, in contrast to Sima Qian's Shiji. The Book of Han would set the model for following dynastic histories.

The Tang was an important period for the evolution of the Chinese historiographical tradition. There were previously various other competing historical visions. Despite being an empire, the Tang chose to institutionalize a historical perspective based on the Book of Documents and the Spring and Autumn Annals. The writing of history became an official imperial undertaking during the Tang period, in contrast to the more or less individualistic histories of Sima Qian and Ban Gu during the Han period. Writing histories covering the time from the fall of the Han to the establishment of the Tang was one of these undertakings. Each of these states was described as a dynasty that rose and fell in accordance with the moral deeds of its founding and final rulers, respectively. These were all written within a dynastic framework. The main inspiration for producing these histories was Ban Gu's Book of Han.

Through its long history, the Chinese people have been ruled not by one dynasty, but by a succession of different dynasties. The first orthodox dynasty of China to be described in ancient historical records such as Shiji and Bamboo Annals is the Xia, which was succeeded by the Shang, although concrete existence of the Xia is yet to be archaeologically proven.

Among these dynasties the Han and Tang are often considered as particularly strong periods, although other dynasties are famous for cultural and other achievements (for instance, the Song dynasty is sometimes associated with rapid economic development). Han and Tang, as well as other long, stable dynasties, were followed by periods of disorder and the break-up of China into small regimes.

Out of disorder a leader eventually arose who unified the country and imposed strong central authority. For example, after the Han various dynasties ruled parts of China until Yang Jian reunited China under the Sui dynasty. The Sui set the scene for the long and prosperous Tang. After the fall of Tang, China again saw a period of political upheaval.

There is a famous Chinese proverb expressed in the 16th-century novel Romance of the Three Kingdoms that says "After a long split, a union will occur; after a long union, a split will occur" (分久必合，合久必分). Each of these rulers would claim the Mandate of Heaven to legitimize their rule.

Although this well-known dynastic periodization of China is more or less based on traditional Sinocentric ideology, it also applies to non-native rulers who sought to gain the Mandate of Heaven. While most ruling dynasties in Chinese history were founded by ethnic Han, there were also dynasties established by non-Han peoples beyond the traditional border of China proper dominated by Han people. These include the Yuan founded by Mongols and the Qing founded by Manchus, who later conquered China proper and assumed the title of Emperor of China.

=== Chinese Communist Party ===
The issue of dynastic cycles is a question that has been pondered by the Chinese Communist Party (CCP). Wang Junwei, a scholar at the Institute of Party History and Literature, said escaping China's historical cycles of dynastic rise and falls was "a difficult problem that has not been solved by China’s feudal dynasties in for thousands of years". In 1945, Mao Zedong was asked by Huang Yanpei of the China Democratic League on whether how he aimed to end China's dynastic cycles. Mao replied that "We have found a new path", continuing "It is called democracy. As long as the public maintains their oversight of the government, the government will not slacken in its efforts". Following the founding of the People's Republic of China, the CCP initially considered the dynastic cycle to be a finalized issue, with Feng Wuzhong, a professor of Marxism at the Tsinghua University, stating that the CCP believed China had escaped "the cyclical law of history" as it "could only occur in feudal dynasties or peasant uprising, and could not happen in socialist societies". However, the dissolution of the Soviet Union led the CCP to conclude, in the words of Wang Junwei, that they had not yet "beaten history", as the Soviet Union's example was a "painful lesson warns us that if the Marxist ruling party lacks the spirit of self-revolution… it will eventually be unable to escape the same tragic end".

The question of history has been raised by Chinese leaders Jiang Zemin and Hu Jintao in 1993 and 2004 respectively. Chinese leader Xi Jinping has also raised the issue. To escape the cycle, Xi has proposed that the Party engage in a process of self-revolution. The sixth plenary session of the 19th Central Committee adopted the Resolution on the Major Achievements and Historical Experiences of the Party's 100 Years of Struggle, which put forward self-revolution as "the second answer" to escaping China's historical cycles of dynastic rise and falls, with the first answer being the one given by Mao in 1945. At a meeting of the CCDI in 2022, Xi explained the concept:

Self-revolution is to strengthen the Party's foundation, detoxify and sterilize, make tough decisions, eliminate corruption and promote tissue regeneration, constantly eliminate the viruses that erode the Party's healthy body, constantly improve its own immunity, and prevent the Party from collapsing when its leaders die.

== Criticism ==
Japanese Neo-Confucianism scholar and monk Yamazaki Ansai completely rejected the Yi Xing philosophy, which viewed the Dynastic cycle as esoterical necessity in Confucianism. Ansai maintained the position that people should be loyal to their ruler, even if the ruler was a tyrant. Ansai's view of blending patriotism with Neo-Confucianism even goes so far that he claimed he will "personally kill Confucius and Mencius themselves if they ever invade Japan.".

Historian and professor Morris Rossabi also expressed the view that the dynastic cycle is harmful to the categorization and research of Chinese history, with the dynastic cycle "overemphasizing the roles of the emperors and the courts in shaping the history of China", and that misconceptions arising from the dynastic cycle theory "was an idea of the insignificance of eras that lacked either strong dynasties or dynasties that ruled over all of China."

== See also ==
- Asabiyyah
- Chinese uniformity
- Cliodynamics
- Dialectic
- Dynasties of China
- Historic recurrence
- History of China
- Kyklos
- Mandate of Heaven
- Sexagenary cycle
- Social cycle theory
- Strauss–Howe generational theory
