= Seventh plenary session of the 19th Central Committee of the Chinese Communist Party =

Event held in Beijing (8-12 October 2022)

Seventh plenary session of the 19th Central Committee of the Chinese Communist Party 中国共产党第十九届中央委员会第七次全体会议
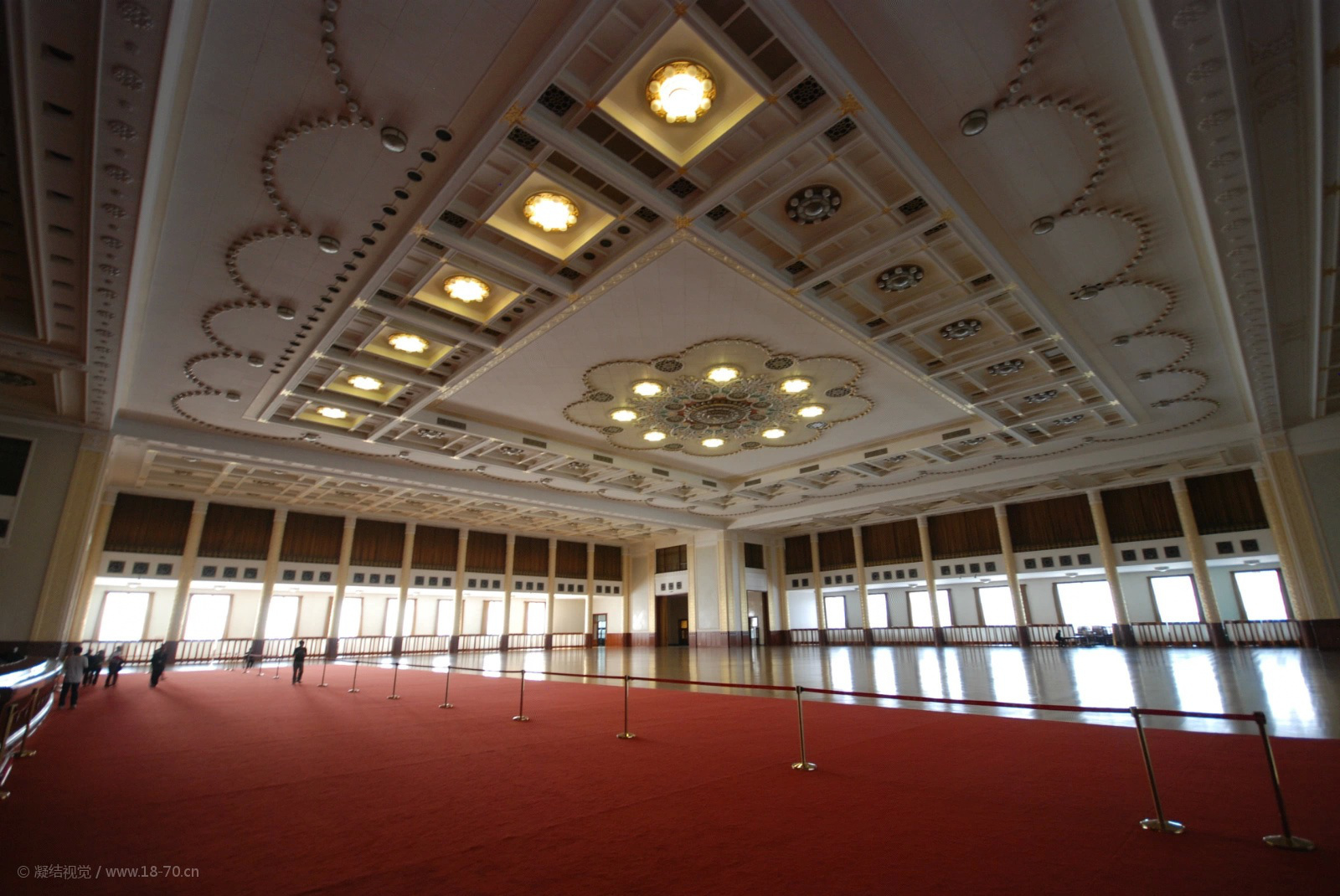
- Panoramic view of the Banquet Hall in the Great Hall of the People
- Date: October 9–12, 2022
- Locations: Banquet Hall, Great Hall of the People, Beijing, China
- Previous event: 6th Plenary Session of the 19th Central Committee
- Next event: 1st Plenary Session of the 20th Central Committee
- Participants: 199 Central Committee members 159 Central Committee alternate members
- General Secretary: Xi Jinping

Seventh plenary session of the 19th Central Committee of the Chinese Communist Party
- Simplified Chinese: 中国共产党第十九届中央委员会第七次全体会议
- Traditional Chinese: 中國共產黨第十九屆中央委員會第七次全體會議
Transcriptions
Standard Mandarin
- Hanyu Pinyin: Zhōngguó Gòngchǎndǎng Dìshíjiǔ Zhōngyāng Wěiyuánhuì Dìqīcì Quántǐ Huìyì

Abbreviation
- Simplified Chinese: 中共十九届七中全会
- Traditional Chinese: 中共十九屆七中全會
Transcriptions
Standard Mandarin
- Hanyu Pinyin: Zhōnggòng Shíjiǔjiè Qīzhōng Quánhuì

The seventh plenary session of the 19th Central Committee of the Chinese Communist Party was convened on October 9 to 12, 2022, immediately before the opening of the 20th National Congress of the Chinese Communist Party.

== Preparation ==
On August 30, 2022, the CCP Politburo held a meeting and decided to convene the seventh plenary session of the 19th CCP Central Committee on October 9, and recommended to the Plenary Session that the 20th National Congress be held in Beijing on October 16.

On September 9, 2022, the Politburo held a meeting to study the draft report of the 19th Central Committee to the 20th National Congress, the draft of the Constitution of the Chinese Communist Party, and the draft work report of the 19th Central Commission for Discipline Inspection to the 20th National Congress.

== Meeting ==
Based on the proposal of the Politburo, the plenary session decided that the 20th National Congress of the CCP would be held in Beijing on October 16, 2022.

Xi Jinping, general secretary of the Chinese Communist Party, delivered a work report to the plenary session on behalf of the Politburo of the CCP Central Committee and explained to the plenary session the draft report of the 19th CCP Central Committee to the 20th National Congress of the CCP. Wang Huning, member of the Politburo Standing Committee and a Member of the Central Secretariat, explained to the plenary session the draft of the CCP Constitution.

The plenary session discussed and adopted the report of the 19th Central Committee to the 20th National Congress, discussed and adopted the work report of the 19th Central Commission for Discipline Inspection to the 20th National Congress, and discussed and adopted the CCP constitution. The plenary session confirmed the previous decision of the Politburo to expel Fu Zhenghua, Shen Deyong and Zhang Jinghua from the CCP, and to remove Li Jia from his position within the party. The plenary session decided to appoint alternate members of the Central Committee Ma Guoqiang, Wang Ning and Wang Weizhong as members of the Central Committee.

== See also ==
- 20th National Congress of the Chinese Communist Party
