= Chinese emperors family tree =

This is a list of articles containing Chinese emperors family trees:

- Family tree of Chinese monarchs (ancient)
- Family tree of Chinese monarchs (Warring States period)
- Family tree of Chinese monarchs (early)
- Family tree of Chinese monarchs (middle)
- Family tree of Chinese monarchs (late)
