= Mandate of Heaven =

Political doctrine of divine legitimacy in China

- An infographic showing the dynastic cycle of the Chinese dynasties, including the Mandate of Heaven
- Traditional Chinese: 天命
- Simplified Chinese: 天命
- Literal meaning: "Heaven's command"
Transcriptions
Standard Mandarin
- Hanyu Pinyin: Tiānmìng
- Bopomofo: ㄊㄧㄢ ㄇㄧㄥˋ
- Gwoyeu Romatzyh: Tianminq
- Wade–Giles: T'ien^{1}-ming^{4}
- Tongyong Pinyin: Tian-mìng
- IPA: [tʰjɛ́n.mîŋ]
Yue: Cantonese
- Yale Romanization: Tīnmihng
- Jyutping: tin1 ming6
- IPA: [tʰin˥ mɪŋ˨]
Southern Min
- Hokkien POJ: Thian-bēng
- Tâi-lô: Thian-bīng
Middle Chinese
- Middle Chinese: tʰen mjæ̀ng
Old Chinese
- Baxter–Sagart (2014): *l̥ˁi[n] m-riŋ-s
- Zhengzhang: *qʰl'iːn mreŋs

The Mandate of Heaven (Chinese: 天命; pinyin: Tiānmìng; Wade–Giles: T'ien^{¹}-ming^{⁴}; lit. 'Heaven's command') is a Chinese political doctrine that was used in Ancient China and Imperial China to legitimize the rule of the Chinese Monarch. According to this doctrine, Heaven (天, Tian) bestows its mandate (Note: The "mandate" of Heaven's Mandate is the same word (命) the sovereign used to appoint an aristocratic relative to rule a regional state. In this sense the relation between Heaven and the sovereign was analogous to the relation between the sovereign and the regional lord.) on a virtuous ruler, called the Son of Heaven (天子, Tianzi), who is the supreme universal monarch that will rule the world (天下, Tianxia; "[all] under heaven"). If a ruler was overthrown, this was interpreted as an indication that the ruler and his dynasty were unworthy and had lost the Mandate. It was also a common belief that natural disasters such as famine and flood were divine retributions bearing signs of Heaven's displeasure with the ruler, so there would often be revolts following major disasters as the people saw these calamities as signs that the Mandate of Heaven had been withdrawn.

The Mandate of Heaven does not require a legitimate ruler to be of noble birth. Chinese dynasties such as the Han and Ming were founded by men of common origins, but they were seen as having succeeded because they had gained the Mandate of Heaven. Retaining the mandate is contingent on the just and able performance of the rulers and their heirs.

Corollary to the concept of the Mandate of Heaven was the right of rebellion against an unjust ruler. The Mandate of Heaven was often invoked by philosophers and scholars in China as a way to curtail the abuse of power by the ruler, in a system that had few other checks. Chinese historians interpreted a successful revolt as evidence that Heaven had withdrawn its mandate from the ruler. Throughout Chinese history, times of poverty and natural disasters were often taken as signs that Heaven considered the incumbent ruler unjust and thus in need of replacement. The classical statement of the legitimacy of rebellion against an unjust ruler, found in the Mencius, was often edited out of that text.

The concept of the Mandate of Heaven also extends to the ruler's family having divine rights and was first used to support the rule of the kings of the Zhou dynasty to legitimize their overthrow of the earlier Shang dynasty. It was used throughout the history of China to legitimize the successful overthrow and installation of new dynasties, including by non-Han dynasties such as the Qing dynasty. The Mandate of Heaven has been called the Zhou dynasty's most important contribution to Chinese political thought, but it coexisted and interfaced with other theories of sovereign legitimacy, including abdication to the worthy and five phases theory.

== History ==
=== Transition between the Shang and the Zhou ===
The prosperous Shang dynasty saw its rule filled with multiple outstanding accomplishments. Notably, the dynasty lasted for a considerable time during which 31 kings ruled over an extended period of 17 generations. The rule of the Shang kings has been described as hegemonic. Royal authority flowed from the person of the king, enforced by his military. Neighbouring clans were allied through marriage and adopted into the Shang ancestral temple.

A poem about the last years of the Shang dynasty reads "Heaven sends down death and disorder; famine comes repeatedly." Paleoclimatic data show a long-term period of cooling in the northern hemisphere, which reached its maximum right around the fall of the Shang.

In 1059 BCE, two unusual celestial phenomena took place: in May, the densest clustering in five hundred years' time of the five planets visible to the naked eye could be seen in the constellation of Cancer, and a few seasons later Halley's Comet appeared. One or more of these was interpreted by the powerful Lord of Zhou as a visible sign indicating supernatural approval. Early records, such as the inscription on the Da Yu ding, employ language more descriptive than theoretical: "the great command in the sky" (天有大令). (Note: The early word here for "command" (令; líng) had either not yet diverged from the modern version (命; mìng) or was written to express the same word.)

Although both the Shang and Zhou claimed divine ancestry, the Zhou were the first to use the concept of the Mandate of Heaven to explain their right to assume rule and presumed that the only way to hold the mandate was to rule well in the eyes of Heaven. They also stated that the Shang came into power because the Xia had lost their mandate, which had then been bestowed upon the Shang, leading to the fall of the Xia and the rise of the Shang. The Xia gave precedent and legitimacy to the Zhou's own rebellion. No Western Zhou bronze inscriptions mention the Xia, or any other dynasty preceding the Shang. The Zhou believed that the Shang ruling house had become morally corrupt and that the Shang leaders' loss of virtue entitled their own house to take over. The overthrow of the Shang Dynasty, they said, was in accordance with the mandate given by Heaven. Even at the time of the inauguration ritual of third-generation King Kang of Zhou, the royal command read out to the new king explicitly stated the belief that Heaven had changed its mandate.

In the political theory of the Zhou, legitimate authority flowed directly from Heaven to their founding dynast, King Wen. Although he did not live to see the Zhou conquest of Shang, his legitimacy passed to his heirs. Early on in the dynasty, there was some debate as to whether Heaven's mandate had fallen to the senior sons of King Wen's line, or to the house of Zhou as a group, as exemplified by an exchange surviving in the classic Book of Documents.

=== Eastern Zhou ===
The Zhou dynasty was marked by early success and expansion until the death on campaign of King Kang's successor, King Zhao of Zhou. During the ensuing centuries, central authority waned overall, driven by socioeconomic pressures. This culminated in a succession crisis which saw the aristocracy split between two competing candidates for a number of years. When the crisis resolved, the royal house retained only a tiny amount of land and no real military power. This marked the beginning of the Eastern Zhou. During the decline of the royal house, although real power was wrested from their grasp, their divine legitimacy was not brought into question, and even with the king reduced to something of a figurehead, his prestige remained supreme as Heaven's eldest son.

However, there is epigraphic evidence that, in private, the rulers of the state of Qin (which would go on to conquer everyone else and become the first dynasty of the imperial era) held that their ancestors had received Heaven's mandate. As early as the 600s BCE, multiple inscriptions attest to this idea. It is unclear whether the Qin rulers meant they believed they had celestial approval to replace the Zhou kings, whether they believed themselves the appointed heirs of the Zhou should the royal line come to an end, or whether their receipt of Heaven's mandate was construed as issuing through the Zhou king to give them legitimate authority over their own lands.

=== Qin and Han dynasties ===
When the Zhou dynasty did come to an end, Qin absorbed the remainder of their lands, as well as those of all their competitors. The Mandate of Heaven did not play a direct part in their public relations, going unmentioned in all surviving material. The Qin dynasty was not long-lived: after the death of first emperor Qin Shihuang, widespread revolts by prisoners, peasants, unhappy soldiers, ambitious minor officials, and remnants of the recently defeated aristocracy rapidly ensured the downfall of the central government. The ensuing Chu–Han contention ended with the success of Liu Bang and establishment of the Han dynasty.

Surviving historical documents from the Han dynasty paint the preceding Qin in a deeply unfavourable light, emphasising tyrannical policies, the incompetence of the second emperor, and giving an account of illegitimate birth for the first emperor. In this portrayal, it is clear the Qin had lost the Mandate, if they had ever possessed it to begin with. It was an uncomfortable fact that Han founder Liu Bang rose to power from a background outside the aristocracy, and achieved victory through military accomplishments. To accommodate this, Liu Bang was ascribed a magical birth, and later a divine ancestry.

When Wang Mang took power at the end of the western Han, he used the acceptance of the theory of Heaven's Mandate to his advantage. Auspicious unusual events were said to portend Heaven's choosing a new heir, so Wang fabricated omens indicating that Heaven had changed its mandate, and that it had chosen him.

Following the restoration of the Han house to power, the Mandate of Heaven stood on uncertain grounds. Some theorists decoupled judgments of virtue from the mandate, seeing it primarily as inherited through ancestry, while others abandoned the concept altogether in favour of five phases theories.

=== Era of disunity ===
The final Han emperor abdicated to the powerful minister Cao Pi in CE 220, and in this transfer of power the idea of Heaven's mandate played a large role. The court prognosticator Xu Zhi (許芝) enumerated in a lengthy memorandum the signs he had located in divinatory and historical texts showing that Cao Pi's Wei should succeed the Han. A sequence of written statements by various officials followed, culminating in Emperor Xian of Han's formal announcement of abdication and Cao Pi's accession. The announcement of abdication explicitly mentioned that the mandate of Heaven was not permanent, and no one argued that the virtue of the house of Han had not been in decline for some time. In the eyes of these authors, Heaven's mandate followed virtue. While the idea that Cao Wei was Heaven's legitimate successor predominated for several centuries, the alternate theory that Heaven's mandate instead fell to the rival state of Shu Han was first articulated by Xi Zuochi in the 300s, and was universally accepted by the much later Song dynasty.

The last Wei emperor abdicated in turn to the Western Jin. This dynasty soon lost control of northern China to non-Han ethnic groups, and in the literature of the southern dynasties that followed there began to appear an object called the State-Transmitting Seal. This magical talisman was the physical manifestation of Heaven's mandate, tied up in the fortunes of ruling families, allowing the exiled southern aristocracy to retain their sense of cultural superiority and maintain the validity of Heaven's mandate in the face of counterfactual political reality.

=== Five Dynasties period ===
During the Five Dynasties and Ten Kingdoms Period, there was no dominant Chinese dynasty that ruled all of China. This created a problem for the Song dynasty that followed, as they wanted to legitimize their rule by establishing a clear transmission of the Mandate from the Tang through to the Song. The scholar-official Xue Juzheng compiled the Old History of the Five Dynasties (五代史) during the 960s and 970s, after the Song dynasty had taken northern China from the last of the Five Dynasties, the Later Zhou. A major purpose of the book was to establish justification for the transference of the Mandate of Heaven through these five dynasties and thus to the Song dynasty. He argued that these dynasties met certain vital criteria to be considered as having attained the Mandate of Heaven despite never having ruled all of China. One is that they all ruled the traditional Chinese heartland.

However, there were certain other areas where these dynasties all clearly fell short. The brutal behavior of Zhu Wen and his Later Liang was a source of considerable embarrassment, and thus there was pressure to exclude them from the Mandate. The following three dynasties, the Later Tang, Later Jin, and Later Han were all non-Han Chinese dynasties with rulers from the Shatuo ethnic minority. Additionally, none of them were able to defeat the powerful states to the south and unify the entire Chinese realm. However, Xue Juzheng concluded that the Mandate had indeed passed through each of the Five Dynasties, and thus onto the Song Dynasty when it conquered the last of those dynasties.

The Mandate of Heaven was thought to emanate from the Dao, especially in the Song dynasty.

=== Qing dynasty ===
The Qing dynasty was established by the Manchus who conquered China proper. Nurhaci, who was regarded the founding father of the Qing dynasty, was originally a vassal to the Ming dynasty and later rebelled against the Ming with the Seven Grievances. But according to the Qing rulers it was the peasant rebels led by Li Zicheng who overthrew the Ming, and so the Qing were not responsible for the destruction of the Ming dynasty. Instead, the Qing argued, they had obtained the Mandate of Heaven by defeating the many rebels and bandits that the Ming had failed to control and restoring stability to the empire. Just as stability was a sign of Heaven's favor, difficulties were a sign of Heaven's displeasure. Thus, emperors in the Qing and earlier dynasties often interpreted natural disasters during their reigns as reasons to reflect on their failures to act and govern correctly.

== The right to rule and the right of rebellion ==
Mencius stated that:

The people are of supreme importance; the altars of soil and grain come next; last comes the ruler. That is why he who gains the confidence of the multitudinous people will be Emperor... When a local lord endangers the altars of soil and grain, he should be replaced. When the sacrificial animals are sleek, the offerings are clean and the sacrifices are observed at due times, and yet floods and droughts come [by the agency of heaven], then the altars should be replaced.

— Mencius, 盡心下

Thus, the Mandate of Heaven does not confer an unconditional right to rule. To retain the Mandate of Heaven, a ruler's performance had to be just and effective and not excessively expand and maintain power outside the nation's borders. The people retained a right to rebel. Of the political philosophers of the Warring States period, Mencius was perhaps the most radically revolutionary, deliberately eliding any distinction between overthrowing a wicked ruler and punishing a common criminal. The more conservative Xunzi, writing not much later, regarded rebellion as the apical manifestation of an unfit ruler's ineptitude, only justified if already inevitable. Meanwhile, the authoritarian Han Feizi rejected entirely the concept of a just rebellion, going as far as denouncing such culture heroes as Tang of Shang and Wu of Zhou, rebels who founded successful empires. By the time of the Han dynasty, the right to rebellion was a politically sensitive topic, as the Han rulers could neither deny their own history as being birthed in rebellion nor embrace the idea that they should themselves be overthrown.

The right of rebellion against an unjust ruler has been a part of Chinese political philosophy ever since the Zhou dynasty, and the successful rebellion was interpreted by Chinese historians as evidence that divine approval had passed on to the successive dynasty. The Right of Rebellion is not coded into any official law. Rather, rebellion is always outlawed and severely punished; but is still a positive right grounded in the Chinese moral system. Often, it is used as a justification for actions to overthrow a previous dynasty after a rebellion has been successful and a new dynastic rule has been established. Since the winner is the one who determines who has obtained the Mandate of Heaven and who has lost it, some Chinese scholars consider it to be a sort of victor's justice, best characterized in the popular Chinese saying "The winner becomes king, the loser becomes outlaw" (Chinese: "成者爲王，敗者爲寇"). Due to this, it is considered that Chinese historical accounts of the fall of a dynasty and the rise of a new one must be handled with caution. Chinese traditional historical compilation methods produce accounts that tend to fit their account to the theory, emphasizing aspects tending to prove that the old dynasty lost the Mandate of Heaven and the new one gained it, and de-emphasizing other aspects.

In the 20th and 21st centuries, Confucianist elements of student rebellions often claimed the Mandate of Heaven has been forfeited, as demonstrated by their large-scale activism, with notable instances including the 2014 Sunflower Student Movement in Taiwan and the 2014 and 2019 Hong Kong protests.

In imperial times, Chinese emperors invoked de by striving to be good influences and performing rituals to benefit their status and keep the Mandate of Heaven. Also, the Mandate could not be given to several emperors or rulers at once.

== Influence ==
Because of China's influence in medieval times, the concept of the Mandate of Heaven spread to other East Asian countries as a justification for rule by divine political legitimacy. In Korea, the kingdom of Goguryeo, one of the Three Kingdoms of Korea, adopted the Chinese concept of tianxia which was based on Mandate of Heaven, however in Goguryeo it was changed to be based on divine ancestry. In the Goguryeo story, Jumong was born to Hye Moss, the son of the Emperor, and Yu Hwa, the daughter of Habaek, the god of water. When Yuhwa was pregnant, she entrusted her body to the king of Buyeo and laid an egg, and the person who came out of the egg was Jumong. When Jumong, who was born of eggs, grew up and performed various strange tricks, the sons of King Buyeo became jealous, and Jumong eventually fled Buyeo and built a country called Goguryeo. This is a case in which Goguryeo claimed the legitimacy of expelling Buyeo under the command of heaven by setting him as the son of God. Silla is similar to Goguryeo. According to Silla's founding story, there was no king in the area where Silla was located, but the sixth degree and its sixth degree held a meeting of painters and ruled. They wanted a monarchy in which a king existed rather than the current political system, but one day they found an egg near a well and one was born out of it. It is said that the village chiefs named him Park Hyuk-geose and appointed him king to create the present Silla. the earliest records are from Joseon Dynasty, which made the Mandate of Heaven an enduring state ideology.

The ideology was also adopted in Vietnam, known in Vietnamese as Thiên mệnh (Chữ Hán: 天命). A divine mandate gave the Vietnamese emperor the right to rule, based not on his lineage but on his competence to govern. The later and more centralized Vietnamese dynasties adopted Confucianism as the state ideology, which led to the creation of a Vietnamese tributary system in Southeast Asia that was modeled after the Chinese Sinocentric system in East Asia.

In Japan, the title "Son of Heaven" was interpreted literally where the monarch was referred to as a demigod, deity, or "living god", chosen by the gods and goddesses of heaven. Eventually, the Japanese government found the concept ideologically problematic, preferring not to have divine political legitimacy that was conditional and that could be withdrawn. The Japanese Taihō Code, formulated in 703, was largely an adaptation of the governmental system of the Tang dynasty, but the Mandate of Heaven was specifically omitted.

Recently, China historians have noted that the ruler's Mandate of Heaven had a more local equivalent, which applied to county magistrates and prefects in Ming times. It is called the "Minor Mandate" or 小天命.

== See also ==
- Chinese Empire
- Divine right of kings
- Chinese uniformity
- Dynastic cycle
- East Asian cultural sphere
- Interactions Between Heaven and Mankind
- Natural Law
- Tao, divine order in Chinese philosophy
- Monarchy of China
- Kut (mythology)
- Ma'at
