= Sixth plenary session of the 19th Central Committee of the Chinese Communist Party =

Event held in Beijing (8–11 November 2021)

Sixth plenary session of the 19th Central Committee of the Chinese Communist Party 中国共产党第十九届中央委员会第六次全体会议
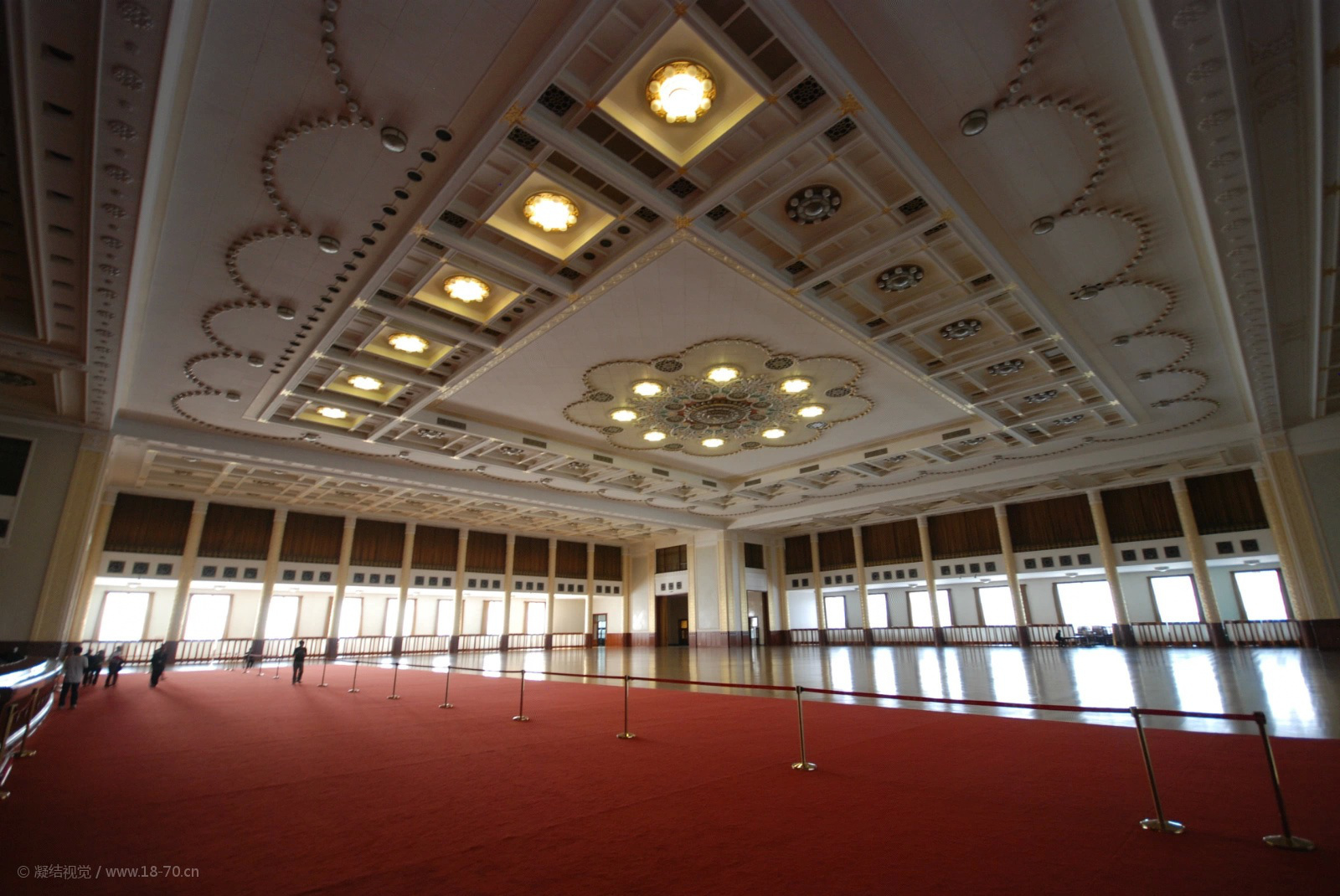
- Panoramic view of the Banquet Hall in the Great Hall of the People
- Date: November 8–11, 2021
- Locations: Banquet Hall, Great Hall of the People, Beijing, China
- Previous event: Fifth plenary session of the 19th Central Committee
- Next event: Seventh plenary session of the 19th Central Committee
- Participants: 197 Central Committee members 151 Central Committee alternate members
- General Secretary: Xi Jinping

Sixth plenary session of the 19th Central Committee of the Chinese Communist Party
- Simplified Chinese: 中国共产党第十九届中央委员会第六次全体会议
- Traditional Chinese: 中國共產黨第十九屆中央委員會第六次全體會議
Transcriptions
Standard Mandarin
- Hanyu Pinyin: Zhōngguó Gòngchǎndǎng Dìshíjiǔjiè Zhōngyāng Wěiyuánhuì Dìliùcì Quántǐ Huìyì

Abbreviation
- Simplified Chinese: 中共十九届六中全会
- Traditional Chinese: 中共十九屆六中全會
Transcriptions
Standard Mandarin
- Hanyu Pinyin: Zhōnggòng Shíjiǔjiè Liùzhōng Quánhuì

The sixth plenary session of the 19th Central Committee of the Chinese Communist Party was convened from November 8 to 11, 2021.

The plenary session listened to and discussed the work report made by General Secretary of the Chinese Communist Party Xi Jinping on behalf of the CCP Politburo. It also reviewed and adopted the Resolution on the Major Achievements and Historical Experiences of the Party's 100 Years of Struggle and the Resolution on Convening the 20th National Congress of the Party. Xi Jinping explained the Resolution on the Major Achievements to the plenary session and delivered a speech at the second plenary meeting.

== Preparation ==
On 10 September 2021, the CCP Central Committee held a symposium for non-party personages in Zhongnanhai to listen to the opinions and suggestions of the leaders of the central committees of various democratic parties, the All-China Federation of Industry and Commerce, and representatives of non-party personages on the CCP Central Committee's resolution on the major achievements and historical experience of the CCP's 100 years of struggle. CCP General Secretary Xi Jinping presided over the symposium. Wang Yang, Wang Huning, and Zhao Leji, members of the Politburo Standing Committee, attended the symposium. Wan Exiang, Chairman of the Revolutionary Committee of the Chinese Kuomintang, Ding Zhongli, Chairman of the China Democratic League, Hao Mingjin, Chairman of the China National Democratic Construction Association, Cai Dafeng, Chairman of the China Association for Promoting Democracy, Chen Zhu, Chairman of the Chinese Peasants' and Workers' Democratic Party, Wan Gang, Chairman of the China Zhi Gong Party, Wu Weihua, Chairman of the Jiusan Society, Su Hui, Chairman of the Taiwan Democratic Self-government League, Gao Yunlong, Chairman of the All-China Federation of Industry and Commerce, and Zhou Guangquan, a representative of non-party personages, spoke successively. Other party and state leaders, heads of relevant central departments, and representatives of non-party personages attended the symposium. It was not until two months later, on November 12, after the closing of the sixth plenary session, that Chinese state media reported on the symposium in detail.

On the eve of the meeting, Xinhua News Agency published a long article on 6 November 2021, titled "Xi Jinping Leads the Centennial Party on a New Journey", praising Xi's achievements during his nine years in power, which was seen as a foreshadowing of the content of the sixth plenary session.

== Meeting ==
=== Work Summary ===
The plenary session fully affirmed the work of the Politburo since the fifth plenary session of the 19th CCP Central Committee. Xi Jinping formally announced the completion of a moderately prosperous society.

=== Resolution on the Party History ===
According to the communiqué, the plenary session made a comprehensive summary of the history of the Chinese Communist Party in the 100 years since its founding, fully affirmed the contributions of the five generations of leadership collectives represented mainly by Mao Zedong, Deng Xiaoping, Jiang Zemin, Hu Jintao and Xi Jinping during the period of the New Democratic Revolution, the period of socialist revolution and construction, and the new period of reform and opening up and socialist modernization, and summarized the process of the Chinese Communist Party overthrowing the oppression of the "three mountains", combining the universal truth of Marxism with China's specific reality, and establishing and developing the theoretical system of socialism with Chinese characteristics.

When discussing the issues of Hong Kong, Macau and Taiwan, the plenary session communiqué included terms that had never appeared in previous Central Plenary Session communiqués: on the Hong Kong and Macau issues, it mentioned for the first time that "patriots should govern Hong Kong" and "patriots should govern Macau"; on Taiwan's political status, it mentioned for the first time that "opposing external interference" and "firmly grasping the dominant position and initiative in cross-strait relations".

The Resolution on the Major Achievements and Historical Experiences of the Party's 100 Years of Struggle adopted at the sixth plenary session mentioned the need to establish Xi Jinping as the core of the CCP Central Committee and the core of the CCP as a whole, and to establish the guiding role of Xi Jinping Thought on Socialism with Chinese Characteristics for a New Era. It also pointed out that since the 18th CCP National Congress, the CCP and the country have achieved historic achievements and undergone historic changes, which is fundamentally due to the CCP Central Committee with Xi Jinping as the core leading the way.

=== 20th National Congress ===
The plenary session decided that the 20th National Congress of the Chinese Communist Party will be held in Beijing in the second half of 2022.

== Press conference ==
At 10:00 a.m. on November 12, 2021, the CCP Central Committee held a press conference to introduce the spirit of the sixth plenary session. Wang Xiaohui, Deputy Minister of the CCP Publicity Department in charge of daily work, Jiang Jinquan, Director of the Central Policy Research Office, Han Wenxiu, deputy director of the Office of the Central Financial and Economic Affairs Commission in charge of daily work, and Qu Qingshan, President of the Institute of Party History and Literature, answered questions from reporters. The press conference was hosted by Xu Lin, Deputy Head of the Publicity Department and Director of the State Council Information Office. Wang Xiaohui introduced the important achievements of the sixth plenary session, expounded from three aspects that Xi Jinping Thought on Socialism with Chinese Characteristics for a New Era has achieved a new leap in the Sinicization of Marxism, and introduced five aspects of the achievements of cultural construction in the new era; Jiang Jinquan introduced the characteristics of China's whole-process people's democracy and the necessity of "two establishes"; Han Wenxiu introduced the "secret" of China's economic miracle, the way to achieve common prosperity and the important significance of the Belt and Road Initiative; Qu Qingshan introduced the status and significance of the Resolution on the Major Achievements and Historical Experiences of the Party's Hundred Years of Struggle.
