= Resolution on the Major Achievements and Historical Experience of the Party over the Past Century =

2021 Chinese Communist Party resolution

- Simplified Chinese: 中共中央关于党的百年奋斗重大成就和历史经验的决议
Transcriptions

The Resolution on the Major Achievements and Historical Experience of the Party over the Past Century is a document that assesses the historical legacy of the Chinese Communist Party (CCP) from its foundation in 1921 until its 100th anniversary in 2021. The Resolution was adopted by the 19th CCP Central Committee on its sixth plenary session held between 8–11 November 2021. Adopted under the leadership of Xi Jinping, this document was the third of its kind after two prior "historical resolutions" adopted by Mao Zedong and Deng Xiaoping.

== Drafting ==
In March 2021, the Politburo of the Chinese Communist Party decided that the sixth plenary session of the 19th CCP Central Committee would focus on studying and summarizing the achievements and historical experiences of the CCP in the last century. A document drafting group was set up, with Xi Jinping as the group leader, and Wang Huning and Zhao Leji as deputy group leaders, with other officials of the CCP and state helping to draft the document.

On 1 April 2021, the CCP Central Committee issued a notice on soliciting opinions on the key issues about drafting the document from within and outside the CCP. On 6 September, the CCP Politburo decided to distribute the draft resolution for soliciting opinions within a certain range within the CCP, including soliciting opinions from some veterans within the party, and also listening to the opinions of the leaders of the democratic parties, the All-China Federation of Industry and Commerce, and representatives of non-party personages.

On 18 October 2021, Xi chaired a Politburo meeting to study the issue of comprehensively summarizing the major achievements. The CCP Politburo listened to the report on the solicitation of opinions on the draft, and decided to submit the draft resolution to the sixth plenary session after making revisions based on the opinions discussed at this meeting. The Resolution was adopted on 11 November, at the end of the sixth plenary session.

== Content ==
The Resolution divides the CCP's history into three eras. The first era, under Mao's leadership, prepared the foundation for socialism with Chinese characteristics. The second era is framed as under the leadership of Deng and his successors. The third era, under General Secretary Xi Jinping's leadership, is framed as the synthesis of the preceding two eras. The Resolution's characterization of Mao as thesis, Deng as the antithesis to excesses of the Mao era, and Xi as the synthesis, reflects Marxist dialectical materialism.

The Resolution begins by describing the country before the Chinese Communist Revolution as a splendid civilization weakened by the aggression of Western imperial powers. Led by Mao and equipped with Marxism, the CCP is described as liberating China. Next, the Resolution describes China's socialist construction during Mao's leadership and his integration "of the basic tenets of Marxism-Leninism with China's realities."

The Resolution describes Mao Zedong Thought as "a summation of theories, principles, and experience on China's revolution and construction that has been proven correct through practice, and [having] put forward a series of important theories for socialist construction." Regarding the Mao era, the 2021 Resolution echoes the position of the 1981 Resolution on Certain Questions in the History of Our Party since the Founding of the People's Republic of China. The 2021 Resolution places greater emphasis Mao-era achievements in the development of national defense and in resisting foreign enemies.

According to the Resolution, Deng, Jiang Zemin, and Hu Jintao explored the path of how best to build socialism in China with a focus on the questions of "what is socialism and how to build it" and "what kind of party to build and how to build it."

The Resolution addresses the holistic national security concept, describing it as encompassing "political, military, homeland security, economic, cultural, social, technological, cyberspace, ecological, resource, nuclear, overseas interests, outer space, deep sea, polar, and biological security issues, among others."

Regarding China's national development, the Resolution repeats the Communist Party's commitment to "encourage, support, and guide" the private sector and states that the Communist Party has also "prompted state capital and state-owned enterprises to grow stronger, better, and larger" and describes the public sector as increasingly "competitive, innovative, risk-resilient, and capable of exerting a greater level of influence and control over the economy."

The Resolution addresses the elimination of absolute poverty in China, building of moderately prosperous society, and progress towards common prosperity and the China Dream.

The document for the first time credited Xi as being the "main innovator" of Xi Jinping Thought. The document declares Xi's leadership as being "the key to the great rejuvenation of the Chinese nation". In comparison with the other historical resolutions, Xi's one did not herald a major change in how the CCP evaluated its history. To accompany the historical resolution, the CCP promoted the terms Two Establishes and Two Upholds, calling the CCP to unite around and protect Xi's core status within the party.

The document addresses two answers to escaping China's historical cycles of dynastic rise and falls. The first answer was given by Mao Zedong in 1945, who said "It is called democracy. As long as the public maintains their oversight of the government, the government will not slacken in its efforts". The second answer is self-revolution, a concept coined by Xi in 2015.

In the section on "Driving Cultural Advancement," the resolution describes socialist culture and national solidarity having increased since Reform and Opening Up, but warns that "misguided ideas have often cropped up, such as money worship, hedonism, ultra-individualism, and historical nihilism".

Regarding regulation of the internet, the resolution states:

The Party puts heavy emphasis on developing and creating new means of communication. It has [promoted integrated development of media, and worked to strengthen the penetration and credibility of media and its ability to guide and influence. The Central Committee has made it clear that failure in the cyberspace domain will spell disaster for the Party's long-term governance. The Party therefore attaches great importance to the Internet as the main arena, battleground, and frontline of the ideological struggle. It has improved the leadership and management systems for the Internet, regulated the cyberspace according to the law, and strived to foster a clean online environment.

The Resolution states that China's "continued success in adapting Marxism to the Chinese context and the needs of our times has enabled Marxism to take on a fresh face in the eyes of the world, and significantly shifted the worldwide historical evolution of and contest between the two different ideologies and social systems of socialism and capitalism in a way that favors socialism."

== See also ==
- Ideology of the Chinese Communist Party
