= Political report =

Chinese Communist Party document

- Simplified Chinese: 政治报告
Transcriptions
Standard Mandarin
- Hanyu Pinyin: Zhèngzhì bàogào

A political report is a type of political document of the Chinese Communist Party (CCP). It is delivered by the CCP General Secretary to the CCP National Congress at the opening of the meeting.

According to the Center for Strategic Translation, the political report "recapitulates the victories and setbacks the Party experienced over the previous five years, announces changes in the Party’s ideological line, and establishes the goals intended to guide all party and state activity in the years to come". The political report is the most authoritative document in China's political system, and its drafting often lasts a year. It is drafted by a drafting group, which is often led by the person on track to be the next General Secretary. During the drafting process, hundreds of cadres provide feedback on the sections of the political report relevant to their responsibilities.

== History ==
Before the 7th CCP National Congress, it was called the Manifesto. The reporter is usually the main person in charge of the CCP Central Committee at that time.

=== Before the 7th National Congress ===
In 1920, the First National Congress of the Chinese Communist Party published the "Manifesto of the Chinese Communist Party".

In 1922, the Second National Congress of the Chinese Communist Party issued the "Manifesto of the Second National Congress of the Chinese Communist Party".

In 1923, the Third National Congress of the Chinese Communist Party issued the "Manifesto of the Third National Congress of the Chinese Communist Party".

In 1925, the Fourth National Congress of the Chinese Communist Party published the "Declaration of the Fourth National Congress of the Chinese Communist Party".

In 1927, the Fifth National Congress of the Chinese Communist Party issued the "Manifesto of the Third National Congress of the Chinese Communist Party".

In 1928, the Sixth National Congress of the Chinese Communist Party issued a "Message to All Comrades" and Zhou Enlai made a "Report on Organizational Issues".

=== Mao Zedong era ===
In 1945, Mao Zedong delivered a political report at the Seventh National Congress of the Chinese Communist Party entitled "On the Coalition Government".

In 1956, Liu Shaoqi delivered a political report at the Eighth National Congress of the Chinese Communist Party.

In 1969, Lin Biao delivered a political report at the Ninth National Congress of the Chinese Communist Party.

In 1973, Zhou Enlai delivered a political report at the 10th National Congress of the Chinese Communist Party.

In 1977, Hua Guofeng delivered a political report at the 11th National Congress of the Chinese Communist Party.

=== After the Reform and Opening Up ===
In 1982, Hu Yaobang delivered a political report at the 12th CCP National Congress entitled "Creating a New Situation in Socialist Modernization in All Respects".

In 1987, Zhao Ziyang delivered a political report at the 13th CCP National Congress entitled " Advancing Along the Road of Socialism with Chinese Characteristics."

In 1992, Jiang Zemin delivered a political report at the 14th CCP National Congress entitled "Accelerating the pace of reform, opening up and modernization and striving for greater success in the cause of socialism with Chinese characteristics."

In 1997, Jiang Zemin delivered a political report at the 15th CCP National Congress entitled "Hold High the Great Banner of Deng Xiaoping Theory and Push Forward the Cause of Building Socialism with Chinese Characteristics into the 21st Century". The theme of the congress was " Hold High the Great Banner of Deng Xiaoping Theory and Push Forward the Cause of Building Socialism with Chinese Characteristics into the 21st Century".

In 2002, Jiang Zemin delivered a political report at the 16th CCP National Congress entitled " Building a moderately prosperous society in all respects and creating a new situation for the cause of socialism with Chinese characteristics ". The theme of the congress was to hold high the great banner of Deng Xiaoping Theory, fully implement the important thought of "Three Represents", carry forward the past, keep pace with the times, build a moderately prosperous society in all respects, accelerate the advancement of socialist modernization, and strive to create a new situation for the cause of socialism with Chinese characteristics.

In 2007, Hu Jintao delivered a political report at the 17th CCP National Congress entitled "Hold High the Great Banner of Socialism with Chinese Characteristics and Strive for New Victories in Building a Moderately Prosperous Society in All Respects". The theme of the congress was to hold high the great banner of socialism with Chinese characteristics, take Deng Xiaoping Theory and the important thought of "Three Represents" as guidance, thoroughly implement the Scientific Outlook on Development, continue to emancipate the mind, persist in reform and opening up, promote scientific development, promote social harmony, and strive for new victories in building a moderately prosperous society in all respects.

In 2012, Hu Jintao delivered a political report at the 18th CCP National Congress entitled "Unswervingly Advancing Along the Road of Socialism with Chinese Characteristics and Striving to Complete the Building of a Moderately Prosperous Society in All Respects". The theme of the congress was to hold high the great banner of socialism with Chinese characteristics, take Deng Xiaoping Theory, the important thought of "Three Represents" and the Scientific Outlook on Development as guidance, emancipate the mind, reform and open up, pool strength, overcome difficulties, unswervingly advance along the road of socialism with Chinese characteristics and strive to complete the building of a moderately prosperous society in all respects.

=== Xi Jinping era ===
In 2017, Xi Jinping delivered a political report at the 19th CCP National Congress entitled "Secure a decisive victory in building a moderately prosperous society in all respects and strive for the great victory of socialism with Chinese characteristics for a new era". The theme of the congress was to stay true to our original aspiration, keep our mission firmly in mind, hold high the great banner of socialism with Chinese characteristics, secure a decisive victory in building a moderately prosperous society in all respects and strive for the great victory of socialism with Chinese characteristics for a new era, and work tirelessly to realize the Chinese dream of the great rejuvenation of the Chinese nation.

In 2022, Xi Jinping delivered a political report at the 20th CCP National Congress entitled "Hold High the Great Banner of Socialism with Chinese Characteristics and Work Together for the Comprehensive Construction of a Modern Socialist Country". The theme of the congress was to hold high the great banner of socialism with Chinese characteristics, fully implement the socialist ideology with Chinese characteristics in the new era, carry forward the great spirit of the founding of the Party, be confident and self-reliant, uphold integrity and make innovations, forge ahead with courage and determination, and work together for the comprehensive construction of a modern socialist country and the comprehensive promotion of the great rejuvenation of the Chinese nation.
