= Monarchy of China =

- Imperial
- Heirloom Seal of the Realm

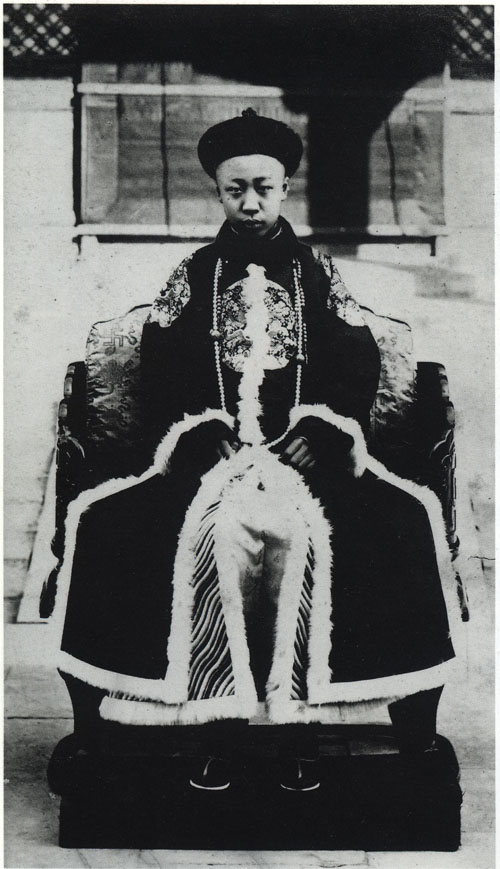
- Last to reign Puyi; 2 December 1908 – 12 February 1912

Details
- Style: His Imperial Majesty (陛下) (Note: "His Imperial Majesty" is the common English translation of the style of Chinese monarchs with imperial ranks. Rulers of lesser ranks were styled differently.) and various others
- First monarch: Yellow Emperor (traditional)
- Last monarch: Puyi (Note: The last ruler of the Chinese monarchy is disputed. Puyi (reigning as the Xuantong Emperor) was the final emperor of the Qing dynasty, the last dynasty with orthodox status in Chinese historiography, from 2 December 1908 to 12 February 1912. He was reinstalled as emperor of the Qing dynasty in the Manchu Restoration between 1 July 1917 and 12 July 1917. He later became emperor of Manchukuo, a puppet state of the Empire of Japan, from 1 March 1934 to 17 August 1945. Both the Manchu Restoration and his reign in Manchukuo are not widely recognized as legitimate in Chinese historiography. Yuan Shikai was the founder and the only emperor of the Empire of China from 12 December 1915 to 22 March 1916 as the Hongxian Emperor, but is usually not recognized as legitimate in Chinese historiography. Therefore, Puyi is usually considered the last monarch of China for his first reign between 1908 and 1912 in the Qing dynasty.)
- Abolished: 12 February 1912 (Note: The Qing dynasty, the last dynasty with orthodox status in Chinese historiography, collapsed on 12 February 1912 with the issuance of the Imperial Edict of the Abdication of the Qing Emperor. The Qing dynasty was briefly restored in an episode known as the Manchu Restoration in 1917. The Empire of China existed from 1915 to 1916. Manchukuo, a puppet state of the Empire of Japan, existed as a monarchy from 1934 to 1945. However, the Manchu Restoration, the Empire of China, and Manchukuo are not widely considered as legitimate in Chinese historiography. Therefore, the Chinese monarchy is usually regarded as having ended in 1912 as a result of the Xinhai Revolution.)
- Residences: Forbidden City (Note: The Forbidden City in Beijing was the seat of government and the main residence of Chinese monarchs of the Qing dynasty, the last dynasty with orthodox status in Chinese historiography, from 1644 to 1912.) and various others
- Appointer: Non-hereditary (until 2070 BC); Hereditary (since 2070 BC) (Note: The Xia dynasty is typically considered the first dynasty of China in orthodox Chinese historiography. However, sources such as the Book of Documents record two dynasties—"Ancient Tang" (古唐) and "Yu" (虞)—that existed before the Xia dynasty. Whereas traditional sources disagree on the year of establishment of the Xia dynasty, the Xia–Shang–Zhou Chronology Project commissioned by the government of the People's Republic of China identified it as 2070 BCE.)

China was a monarchy from prehistoric times up to 1912, when a republic was established. The succession of legendary monarchs of China were non-hereditary. Dynastic rule began c. 2070 BCE when Yu the Great established the Xia dynasty, and monarchy lasted until 1912 when dynastic rule collapsed together with the monarchical government. Various attempts at preserving and restoring the Chinese monarchy occurred during and following the 1911 Revolution, but these regimes were short-lived and lacked widespread recognition.

The monarchy of China took the form of absolute monarchy during most of its existence, even though the actual power of the ruler varied depending on his/her ability to consolidate the rule and various other factors. On 3 November 1911, the Qing dynasty issued the constitutional Nineteen Creeds which limited the power of the emperor, marking the official transition to a constitutional monarchy. However, after only 3 months, the monarchy was abolished.

During periods of political disunity, China was divided among competing dynasties that often claimed exclusive Chinese politico-cultural orthodoxy; in such cases, more than one Chinese monarchy existed simultaneously. Throughout Chinese history, there were monarchs of both ethnic Han and non-Han origins, including many who were of mixed heritage.

== Territorial domains ==
Approximate territories ruled by the Chinese monarchy throughout history

While the Chinese monarchy was originally established along the Yellow River and Yangtze River in China proper, various Chinese dynasties expanded to incorporate other regions into the Chinese realm.

At various points in time, the Chinese monarchy exercised control over China proper (including Hainan, Macau, and Hong Kong), Taiwan, Manchuria (both Northeast China and Outer Manchuria), Sakhalin, Mongolia (both Inner Mongolia and Outer Mongolia), Vietnam, Tibet, Xinjiang, as well as parts of Central Asia, the Korean Peninsula, Afghanistan, and Siberia. In particular, certain groups of Western scholars use the term "China proper" to distinguish the "core" region of China populated chiefly by the Han people from the "frontier" regions of the Chinese monarchical realm with significant populations of ethnic minorities.

The Chinese monarchy reached its largest territorial extent under either the Yuan dynasty or the Qing dynasty, depending on the historical source. This discrepancy can be mainly attributed to the ambiguous northern border of the Yuan dynasty: whereas some sources describe the Yuan border as located to the immediate north of the northern shore of Lake Baikal, others posit that the Yuan dynasty reached as far north as the Arctic coast. Contrastingly, the borders of the Qing dynasty were demarcated and reinforced through a series of international treaties, including the Treaty of Nerchinsk and the Treaty of Kyakhta, and thus were more well-defined. The total area under the control of the Qing dynasty amounted to more than 13 million km^{2} at its peak.

Apart from exercising direct control over the Chinese realm, the Chinese monarchy also maintained hegemony over other states through the Chinese tributary system. The Chinese tributary system had its roots during the Western Han dynasty and lasted until the 19th century AD when the Sinocentric order collapsed.

== Dynasties and ethnicities ==
Since the establishment of the Xia dynasty, China had been ruled by a succession of dynasties. A recurring theme in Chinese history, dynastic transitions occurred typically as a result of military conquest or usurpation. Historians often seek to account for Chinese dynastic transitions using the concept of dynastic cycle.

In history, China was ruled by dynasties of various ethnic origins. Although it is a common practice in Chinese historiography to label a particular dynasty as being ruled by a specific ethnicity, there were Chinese monarchs who had mixed heritage. For instance, the Emperor Xiaoming of the Xianbei-led Northern Wei dynasty was of mixed Xianbei and Han heritage; he obtained his Han ancestry from his mother, the Empress Ling. Similarly, the Kangxi Emperor of the Manchu-led Qing dynasty was of mixed Manchu and Han descent; he acquired his Han ancestry from his mother, the Empress Xiaokangzhang. Therefore, the ethnic identity of the ruling families as assigned by historians should not be regarded as absolute.

== Abolition and legacy ==
On 10 October 1911, the Wuchang Uprising broke out in modern-day Wuhan, marking the start of the Xinhai Revolution. Led by the Tongmenghui, the predecessor of the Kuomintang, the Xinhai Revolution soon spread to other parts of China. On 1 January 1912, the Republic of China was proclaimed by Sun Yat-sen in Nanjing. On 12 February 1912, the Xuantong Emperor abdicated, marking the end of the Qing dynasty and the Chinese monarchy altogether.

According to the theory of the succession of states and Chinese historiographical tradition, the Republic of China is accepted as the legitimate successor to the Qing dynasty and the Chinese monarchy. In particular, the Imperial Edict of the Abdication of the Qing Emperor issued by the Empress Dowager Longyu provided the legal basis for the Republic of China to inherit all territories of the Qing dynasty and to preserve the territorial integrity of the new Chinese state.

The National Day of the Republic of China, celebrated today in the Taiwan Area, commemorates the anniversary of the Wuchang Uprising. It was also celebrated officially in mainland China between 1912 and 1949 prior to the retreat of the Government of the Republic of China to Taiwan.

== Monarchism in post-monarchical China ==
During and after the Xinhai Revolution, there were various attempts at reviving the Chinese monarchy. All these attempts ultimately ended in failure.

=== Emperorship by Duke of Yansheng or Marquis of Extended Grace ===
During the Xinhai Revolution, there were numerous proposals advocating for the replacement of the Manchu-led Qing dynasty by a new dynasty of Han ethnicity. Kong Lingyi (孔令貽), a 76th-generation descendant of Confucius and the Duke of Yansheng, was identified as a potential candidate for Chinese emperorship by Liang Qichao. Meanwhile, gentry in Anhui and Hebei supported a restoration of the Ming dynasty under Zhu Yuxun (朱煜勳), the Marquis of Extended Grace. Both suggestions failed to materialize. In the year of 1937, the Japanese during their conquest of China offered the position of "Emperor of China" to the Duke of Yansheng, Kung Te-cheng, but he declined the offer.

=== Empire of China ===
In 1915, Yuan Shikai proclaimed the Empire of China. It soon sparked the National Protection War and the empire was abolished after 3 months.

=== Manchu Restoration ===
In 1917, the Qing loyalist Zhang Xun reinstalled Puyi to the Chinese throne. This attempt at restoring the Qing dynasty, known as the Manchu Restoration, lasted only 11 days.

=== Manchukuo ===
The Japanese puppet state Manchukuo was established in Northeast China in 1932. This regime subsequently became a monarchy with Puyi as the emperor in 1934. Manchukuo collapsed in 1945 following the Soviet invasion of Manchuria and the unconditional surrender of Japan.

== Gallery ==
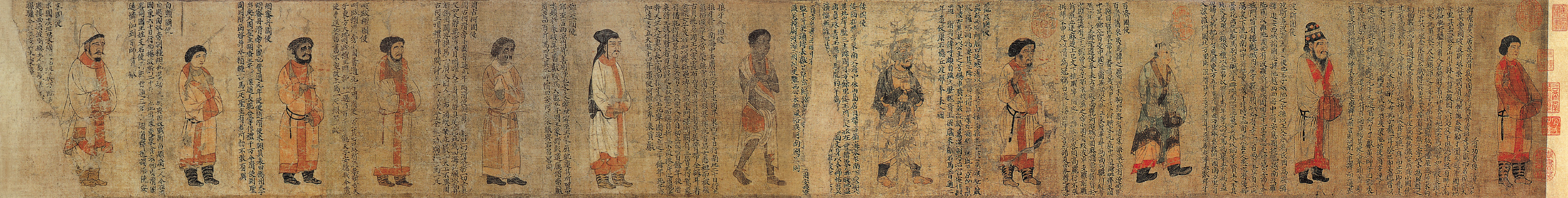
The Portraits of Periodical Offering of Liang illustrates foreign envoys in the imperial court of the Liang dynasty.

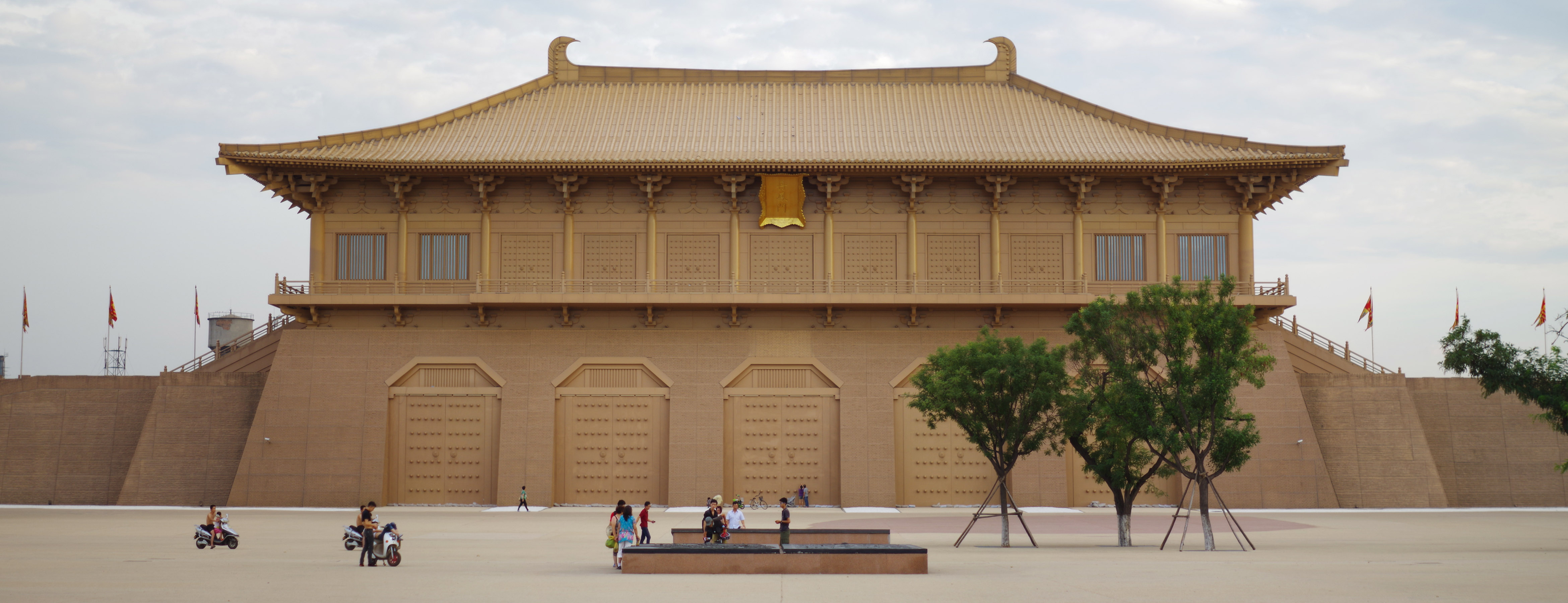
The reconstructed Danfeng Gate of the Daming Palace, the imperial palace complex of the Tang dynasty.

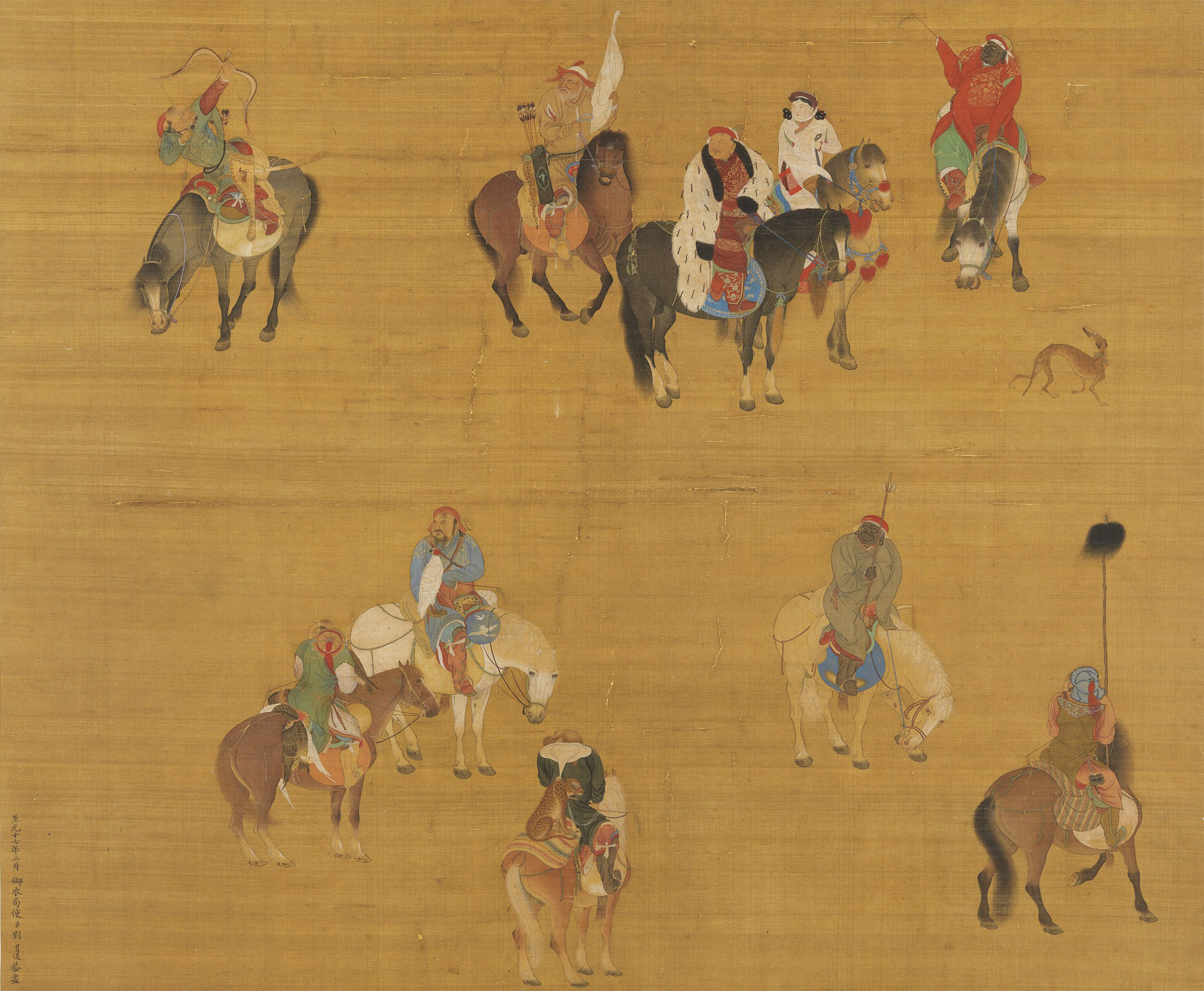
A painting by Liu Guandao depicting the Emperor Shizu of Yuan on a hunting expedition.

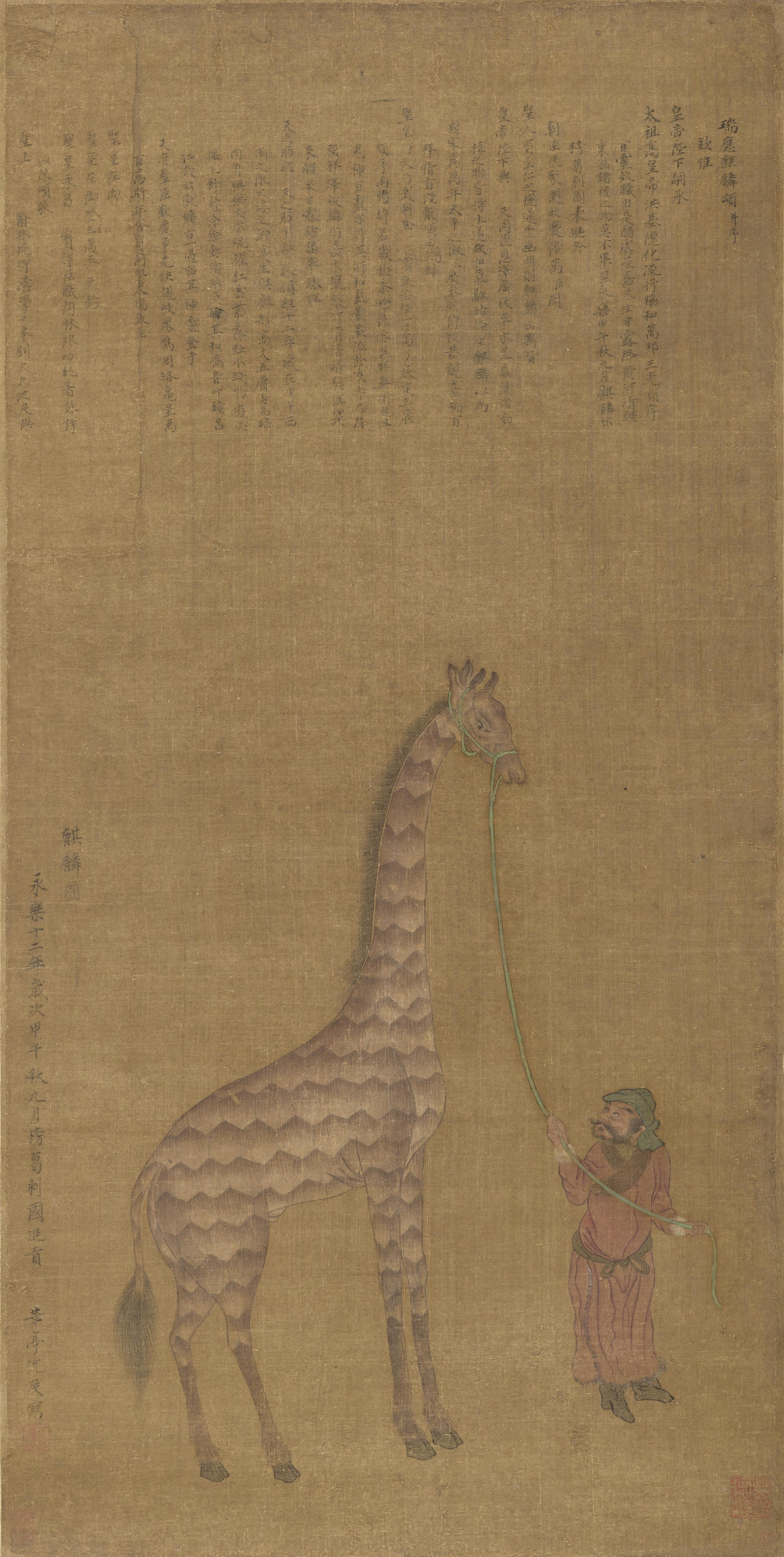
A Bengali envoy presenting a giraffe as a tributary gift in the name of Sultan Saifuddin Hamza Shah of the Ilyas Shahi dynasty of Bengal to the Yongle Emperor.

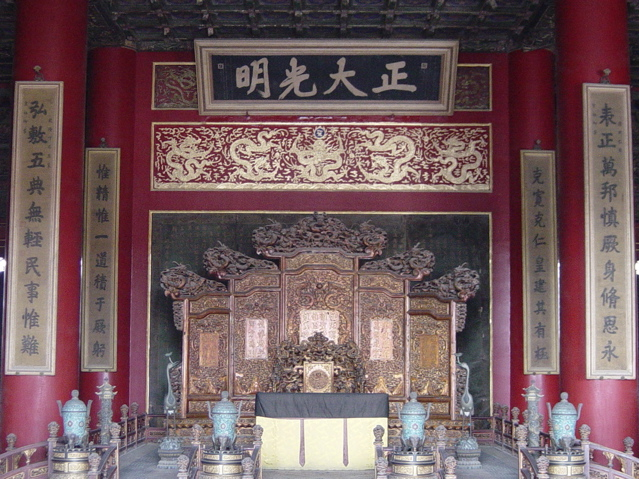
The Dragon Throne in the Palace of Heavenly Purity within the Forbidden City was a symbol of Chinese imperial power. The "Dragon Throne" can also be used metonymically to refer to the monarchy of China.

The imperial seal of the Qing dynasty.

== See also ==
- Chinese Empire
- Chinese Empire Reform Association
- Chinese expansionism
- Chinese nobility
- Chinese sovereign
- Conquest dynasty
- Dragon Throne
- Dynasties of China
- Emperor at home, king abroad
- Emperor of China
- Family tree of ancient Chinese emperors
- Family tree of Chinese monarchs (early)
- Family tree of Chinese monarchs (late)
- Family tree of Chinese monarchs (middle)
- Foreign relations of imperial China
- Golden ages of China
- Historical capitals of China
- History of China
- List of Chinese monarchs
- List of recipients of tribute from China
- List of tributary states of China
- Mandate of Heaven
- Names of China
- Pax Sinica
- Political systems of Imperial China
- Royalist Party
- Sinicization
- Sinocentrism
- Sinosphere
- Succession to the Chinese throne
- Timeline of Chinese history
- Tongmenghui
- Tributary system of China
