= Dynasties of China =

For most of its history until the 20th century, China consisted of one or several dynastic kingdoms or states under the rule of hereditary monarchs. Beginning with the establishment of a system of dynastic rule by Yu the Great c. 2070 BC, and ending with the abdication of the Xuantong Emperor, Puyi, in AD 1912, China came to organize itself around the hereditary succession of predominantly male emperors, and more broadly their family dynasties. (Note: While the Xia dynasty is typically considered to be the first orthodox Chinese dynasty, numerous sources including the Book of Documents mention two other dynasties that preceded the Xia: the "Tang" (唐) and the "Yu" (虞) dynasties. The former is sometimes called the "Ancient Tang" (古唐) to distinguish it from other dynasties named "Tang". Should the historicity of these earlier dynasties be attested, Yu the Great would not have been the initiator of dynastic rule in China.) (Note: All attempts at restoring monarchical and dynastic rule in China following the Xinhai Revolution ended in failure. Hence, the abdication of the Xuantong Emperor in AD 1912 is typically regarded as the formal end of the Chinese monarchy.) While most dynasties were established by members of the dominant Han ethnic group (and its predecessor the Huaxia), dynasties throughout Chinese history have also been founded by non-Han ethnicities.

Dividing Chinese history into dynastic epochs is a convenient and conventional method of periodization. Accordingly, a dynasty may be used to delimit the era during which members of a family reigned, as well as to describe events, trends, personalities, artistic compositions, and artifacts of that period. For example, porcelain made during the Ming dynasty may be referred to as "Ming porcelain".

The longest-reigning dynasty of China was the Zhou dynasty, ruling for a total length of about 790 years, albeit that this period is now divided into the Western Zhou and the Eastern Zhou in Chinese historiography. The largest Chinese dynasty in terms of territorial size was either the Yuan dynasty or the Qing dynasty, depending on the historical source. (Note: As per contemporary historiographical norm, the "Yuan dynasty" in this article refers exclusively to the realm based in Dadu. However, the Han-style dynastic name "Great Yuan" (大元) as proclaimed by the Emperor Shizu of Yuan and the claim to Chinese political orthodoxy were meant for the entire Mongol Empire. In spite of this, "Yuan dynasty" is rarely used in the broad sense of the definition by modern-day scholars due to the de facto disintegration of the Mongol Empire.)

The term Tiāncháo (天朝; "Celestial Dynasty" or "Heavenly Dynasty") was frequently employed as a self-reference by Chinese dynasties. As a form of respect and subordination, Chinese tributary states referred to these dynasties as "Tiāncháo Shàngguó" (天朝上國; "Celestial Dynasty of the Exalted State") or "Tiāncháo Dàguó" (天朝大國; "Celestial Dynasty of the Great State").

== Terminology ==
The Chinese character 朝 (cháo) originally meant "morning" or "today". Subsequently, its scope was extended to describe homages that vassals and tributary lords paid to their incumbent liege ruler, which then evolved to refer to the ruling regime itself. Terms commonly used when discussing historical Chinese dynasties include:

- 朝 (cháo; 'dynasty')
- 朝代 (cháodài; 'dynastic era')
- 王朝 (wángcháo; 'royal dynasty') (Note: While the character 王 (wáng) is translated as "king", this term is often more broadly applied to all dynasties, including those whose rulers held non-royal titles, such as "emperor".)
- 皇朝 (huángcháo; 'imperial dynasty')

== History ==
=== Start of dynastic rule ===
A depiction of Yu, the initiator of dynastic rule in China, by the Southern Song court painter Ma Lin

As the founder of China's first orthodox dynasty, the Xia dynasty, Yu the Great is conventionally regarded as the inaugurator of dynastic rule in China. In the Chinese dynastic system, sovereign rulers theoretically possessed absolute power and private ownership of the realm, even though in practice their actual power was dependent on numerous factors. (Note: In AD 1906, the Qing dynasty initiated a series of reforms under the auspices of the Empress Xiaoqinxian to transition to a constitutional monarchy. On 27 August 1908, the Outline of the Constitution Compiled by Imperial Order was promulgated and served as a preliminary version of a full constitution originally intended to take effect 10 years later. On 3 November 1911, as a response to the ongoing Xinhai Revolution, the Qing dynasty issued the Nineteen Major Articles of Good Faith on the Constitution which limited the power of the Qing emperor, marking the official transition to a constitutional monarchy. The Qing dynasty, however, was overthrown on 12 February 1912.) By tradition, the Chinese throne was inherited exclusively by members of the male line, but there were numerous cases whereby the consort kins came to possess de facto power at the expense of the monarchs. (Note: A powerful consort kin, usually a male, could force the reigning monarch to abdicate in his favor, thereby prompting a change in dynasty. For example, Wang Mang of the Xin dynasty was a nephew of the Empress Xiaoyuan who in turn was the spouse of the Western Han ruler, the Emperor Yuan of Han.) This concept, known as jiā tiānxià (家天下; "All under Heaven belongs to the ruling family"), was in contrast to the pre-Xia notion of gōng tiānxià (公天下; "All under Heaven belongs to the public") whereby leadership succession was non-hereditary and based on the abdication system.

There may also be a predynastic period before a regime managed to overthrow the existing dynasty which led to the official establishment of the new dynasty. For example, the state of Zhou that existed during the Shang dynasty, before its conquest of the Shang which led to the establishment of the Zhou dynasty, is referred to as the Predynastic Zhou or Proto-Zhou. Similarly, the state of Qin that existed during the Zhou dynasty before its wars of unification and the establishment of the Qin dynasty in 221 BC is also referred to as the Predynastic Qin or Proto-Qin.

=== Dynastic transition ===
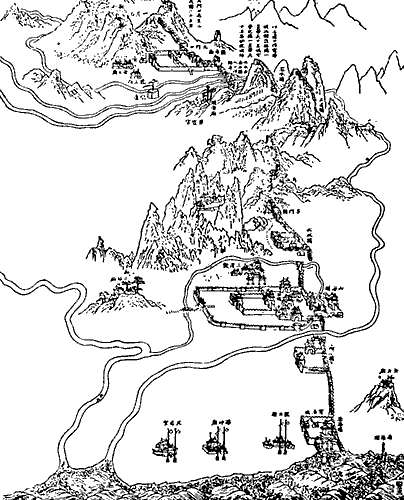
An illustration of the Battle of Shanhai Pass, a decisive battle fought during the Ming–Qing transition. The victorious Qing dynasty extended its rule into China proper thereafter.

The rise and fall of dynasties is a prominent feature of Chinese history. Some scholars have attempted to explain this phenomenon by attributing the success and failure of dynasties to the morality of the rulers, while others have focused on the tangible aspects of monarchical rule. This method of explanation has come to be known as the dynastic cycle.

Cases of dynastic transition (改朝換代; gǎi cháo huàn dài) in the history of China occurred primarily through two ways: military conquest and usurpation. The supersession of the Liao dynasty by the Jin dynasty was achieved following a series of successful military campaigns, as was the later unification of China proper under the Yuan dynasty; on the other hand, the transition from the Eastern Han to the Cao Wei, as well as from the Southern Qi to the Liang dynasty, were cases of usurpation. Oftentimes, usurpers would seek to portray their predecessors as having relinquished the throne willingly—akin to the abdication system of throne succession—as a means to legitimize their rule.

One might incorrectly infer from viewing historical timelines that transitions between dynasties occurred abruptly and roughly. Rather, new dynasties were often established before the complete overthrow of an existing regime. For example, AD 1644 is frequently cited as the year in which the Qing dynasty succeeded the Ming dynasty in possessing the Mandate of Heaven. However, the Qing dynasty was officially proclaimed in AD 1636 by the Emperor Taizong of Qing through renaming the Later Jin established in AD 1616, while the Ming imperial family would rule the Southern Ming until AD 1662. The Ming loyalist Kingdom of Tungning based in Taiwan continued to oppose the Qing until AD 1683. Meanwhile, other factions also fought for control over China during the Ming–Qing transition, most notably the Shun and the Xi dynasties proclaimed by Li Zicheng and Zhang Xianzhong respectively. This change of ruling houses was a convoluted and prolonged affair, and the Qing took almost two decades to extend their rule over the entirety of China proper.

Similarly, during the earlier Sui–Tang transition, numerous regimes established by rebel forces vied for control and legitimacy as the power of the ruling Sui dynasty weakened. Autonomous regimes that existed during this period of upheaval included, but not limited to, Wei (魏; by Li Mi), Qin (秦; by Xue Ju), Qi (齊; by Gao Tancheng), Xu (許; by Yuwen Huaji), Liang (梁; by Shen Faxing), Liang (梁; by Liang Shidu), Xia (夏; by Dou Jiande), Zheng (鄭; by Wang Shichong), Chu (楚; by Zhu Can), Chu (楚; by Lin Shihong), Wu (吳; by Li Zitong), Yan (燕; by Gao Kaidao), and Song (宋; by Fu Gongshi). The Tang dynasty that superseded the Sui launched a decade-long military campaign to reunify China proper.

Frequently, remnants and descendants of previous dynasties were either purged or granted noble titles in accordance with the "two crownings, three respects" system. The latter served as a means for the reigning dynasty to claim legitimate succession from earlier dynasties. For example, the Emperor Xiaojing of Eastern Wei was accorded the title "Prince of Zhongshan" by the Emperor Wenxuan of Northern Qi following the latter's deposition of the former. Similarly, Chai Yong, a nephew of the Emperor Shizong of Later Zhou, was conferred the title "Duke of Chongyi" by the Emperor Renzong of Song; other descendants of the Later Zhou ruling house came to inherit the noble title thereafter.

According to Chinese historiographical tradition, each new dynasty would compose the history of the preceding dynasty, culminating in the Twenty-Four Histories. This tradition was maintained even after the Xinhai Revolution overthrew the Qing dynasty in favor of the Republic of China. However, the attempt by the Republicans to draft the history of the Qing was disrupted by the Chinese Civil War, which resulted in the political division of China into the People's Republic of China on mainland China and the Republic of China on Taiwan.

=== End of dynastic rule ===
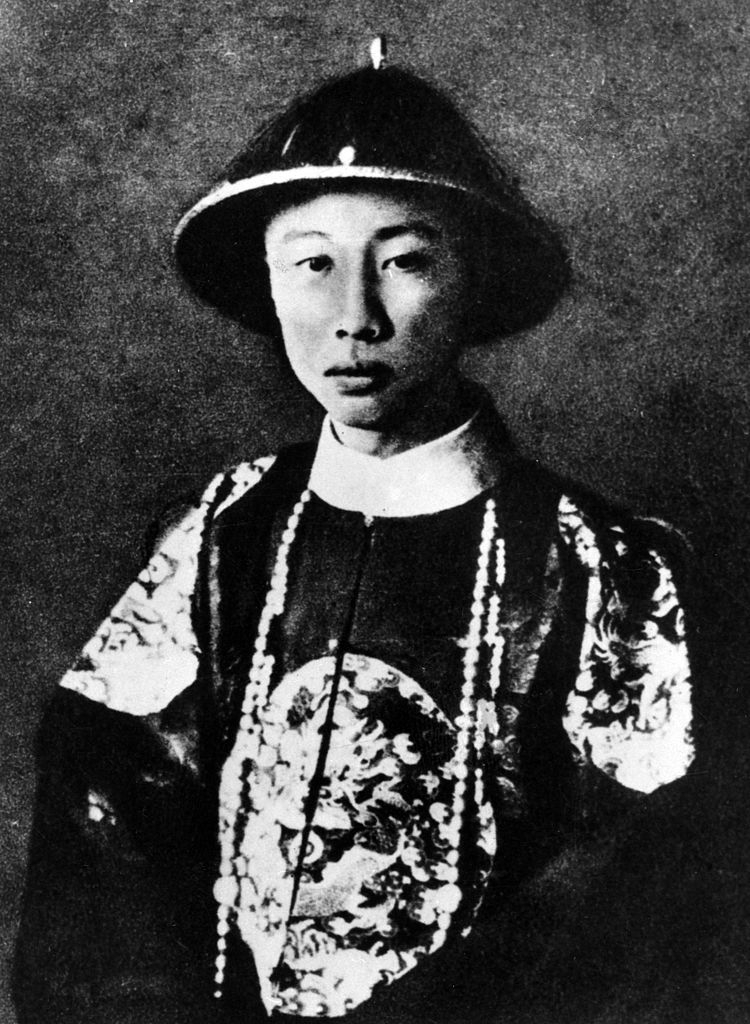
A photograph of the Xuantong Emperor, widely considered to be the last legitimate monarch of China, taken in AD 1922

Dynastic rule in China collapsed in AD 1912 when the Republic of China superseded the Qing dynasty following the success of the Xinhai Revolution. While there were attempts after the Xinhai Revolution to reinstate dynastic rule in China, they were unsuccessful at consolidating their rule and gaining political legitimacy.

During the Xinhai Revolution, there were numerous proposals advocating for the replacement of the Manchu-led Qing dynasty by a new dynasty of Han ethnicity. Kong Lingyi (孔令貽), the Duke of Yansheng and a 76th-generation descendant of Confucius, was identified as a potential candidate for Chinese emperorship by Liang Qichao. Meanwhile, gentry in Anhui and Hebei supported a restoration of the Ming dynasty under Zhu Yuxun (朱煜勳), the Marquis of Extended Grace. Both suggestions were ultimately rejected.

The Empire of China (AD 1915–1916) proclaimed by Yuan Shikai sparked the National Protection War, resulting in the premature collapse of the regime 101 days later. The Manchu Restoration (AD 1917) was an unsuccessful attempt at reviving the Qing dynasty, lasting merely 11 days. Similarly, the Manchukuo (AD 1932–1945; monarchy since AD 1934), a puppet state of the Empire of Japan during World War II with limited diplomatic recognition, was not regarded as a legitimate regime. Thus, historians usually consider the abdication of the Xuantong Emperor on 12 February 1912 as the end of the Chinese dynastic system. Dynastic rule in China lasted almost four millennia.

== Political legitimacy ==
Imperial seal of the Qing dynasty with "Dà Qīng Dìguó zhī xǐ" (大清帝國之璽; "Seal of the Great Qing Empire") rendered in seal script. Seals were a symbol of political authority and legitimacy.

China was politically divided during multiple periods in its history, with different regions ruled by different dynasties. These dynasties were separate states with their own courts and political institutions. Political division existed during the Three Kingdoms, the Sixteen Kingdoms, the Northern and Southern dynasties, and the Five Dynasties and Ten Kingdoms periods, among others.

Relations between Chinese dynasties during periods of division often revolved around political legitimacy, which was derived from the doctrine of the Mandate of Heaven. Dynasties ruled by ethnic Han would proclaim rival dynasties founded by other ethnicities as illegitimate, usually justified based on the concept of Hua–Yi distinction. On the other hand, many dynasties of non-Han origin saw themselves as the legitimate dynasty of China and often sought to portray themselves as the true inheritor of Chinese culture and history. Traditionally, only regimes deemed as "legitimate" or "orthodox" (正統; zhèngtǒng) are termed cháo (朝; "dynasty"); "illegitimate" or "unorthodox" regimes are referred to as guó (國; usually translated as either "state" or "kingdom" (Note: The term "kingdom" is potentially misleading as not all rulers held the title of king. For example, all sovereigns of the Cao Wei held the title huángdì (皇帝; "emperor") during their reign despite the realm being listed as one of the "Three Kingdoms". Similarly, monarchs of the Western Qin, one of the "Sixteen Kingdoms", bore the title wáng (王; usually translated as "prince" in English writings).)), even if these regimes were dynastic in nature.

Such legitimacy disputes existed during the following periods:

- Three Kingdoms
  - The Cao Wei, the Shu Han, and the Eastern Wu considered themselves legitimate while simultaneously denounced the rivaling claims of others.
  - The Emperor Xian of Han abdicated in favor of the Emperor Wen of Cao Wei; hence, the Cao Wei directly succeeded the Eastern Han in orthodox historiography.
  - The Western Jin accepted the Cao Wei as the legitimate dynasty of the Three Kingdoms period and claimed succession from it.
  - The Tang dynasty viewed the Cao Wei as the legitimate dynasty during this period, whereas the Southern Song scholar Zhu Xi proposed treating the Shu Han as legitimate.
- Eastern Jin and Sixteen Kingdoms
  - The Eastern Jin viewed itself as a continuation of the Western Jin, and thus legitimate.
  - Several of the Sixteen Kingdoms such as the Han-Zhao, the Later Zhao, and the Former Qin also claimed legitimacy.
- Northern and Southern dynasties
  - All dynasties during this period saw themselves as the legitimate representative of China; the Northern dynasties referred to their southern counterparts as "dǎoyí" (島夷; "island dwelling barbarians"), while the Southern dynasties called their northern neighbors "suǒlǔ" (索虜; "barbarians with braids").
- Five Dynasties and Ten Kingdoms
  - Having directly succeeded the Tang dynasty, the Later Liang considered itself to be a legitimate dynasty.
  - The Later Tang regarded itself as the restorer of the earlier Tang dynasty and rejected the legitimacy of its predecessor, the Later Liang.
  - The Later Jin succeeded the Later Tang and accepted it as a legitimate regime.
  - The Southern Tang was, for a period of time, considered the legitimate dynasty during the Five Dynasties and Ten Kingdoms period.
  - Since the Song dynasty, Chinese historiography has generally considered the Five Dynasties, as opposed to the contemporary Ten Kingdoms, to be legitimate.
- Liao dynasty, Song dynasty, and Jin dynasty
  - Following the conquest of the Later Jin, the Liao dynasty claimed legitimacy and succession from it
  - Both the Northern Song and Southern Song considered themselves to be the legitimate Chinese dynasty.
  - The Jin dynasty challenged the Song's claim of legitimacy.
  - The succeeding Yuan dynasty recognized all three in addition to the Western Liao as legitimate Chinese dynasties, culminating in the composition of the History of Liao, the History of Song, and the History of Jin.
- Ming dynasty and Northern Yuan
  - The Ming dynasty recognized the preceding Yuan dynasty as a legitimate Chinese dynasty, but asserted that it had succeeded the Mandate of Heaven from the Yuan, thus considering the Northern Yuan as illegitimate.
  - Northern Yuan rulers maintained the dynastic name "Great Yuan" and claimed traditional Han-style titles continuously until AD 1388 or AD 1402; Han-style titles were restored on several occasions thereafter for brief periods, notably during the reigns of Taisun Khan, Choros Esen, and Dayan Khan.
  - The historian Rashipunsug argued that the Northern Yuan had succeeded the legitimacy from the Yuan dynasty; the Qing dynasty, which later defeated and annexed the Northern Yuan, inherited this legitimacy, thus rendering the Ming illegitimate.
- Qing dynasty and Southern Ming
  - The Qing dynasty recognized the preceding Ming dynasty as legitimate, but asserted that it had succeeded the Mandate of Heaven from the Ming, thus refuting the claimed legitimacy of the Southern Ming.
  - The Southern Ming continued to claim legitimacy until its eventual defeat by the Qing.
  - The Ming loyalist Kingdom of Tungning in Taiwan denounced the Qing dynasty as illegitimate.
  - The Joseon dynasty of Korea and the Later Lê dynasty of Vietnam had at various times considered the Southern Ming, instead of the Qing dynasty, as legitimate.
  - The Tokugawa shogunate of Japan did not accept the legitimacy of the Qing dynasty and instead saw itself as the rightful representative of Huá (華; "China"); this narrative served as the basis of Japanese texts such as Chūchō Jijitsu and Kai Hentai.

Traditionally, periods of disunity often resulted in heated debates among officials and historians over which prior dynasties could and should be considered orthodox, given that it was politically imperative for a dynasty to present itself as being linked in an unbroken lineage of moral and political authority back to ancient times. However, the Northern Song statesman Ouyang Xiu propounded that such orthodoxy existed in a state of limbo during fragmented periods and was restored after political unification was achieved. From this perspective, the Song dynasty possessed legitimacy by virtue of its ability to end the Five Dynasties and Ten Kingdoms period despite not having succeeded the orthodoxy from the Later Zhou. Similarly, Ouyang considered the concept of orthodoxy to be in oblivion during the Three Kingdoms, the Sixteen Kingdoms, and the Northern and Southern dynasties periods.

Traditionally, as most Chinese historiographical sources uphold the idea of unilineal dynastic succession, only one dynasty could be considered orthodox at any given time. Most historical sources consider the legitimate line of succession to be as follows:

Xia dynasty → Shang dynasty → Western Zhou → Eastern Zhou → Qin dynasty → Western Han → Eastern Han → Cao Wei → Western Jin → Eastern Jin → Liu Song → Southern Qi → Liang dynasty → Chen dynasty → Sui dynasty → Tang dynasty → Later Liang → Later Tang → Later Jin → Later Han → Later Zhou → Northern Song → Southern Song → Yuan dynasty → Ming dynasty → Qing dynasty

These historical legitimacy disputes are similar to the modern competing claims of legitimacy by the People's Republic of China based in Beijing and the Republic of China based in Taipei. Both regimes formally adhere to the One-China principle and claim to be the sole legitimate representative of the whole of China.

== Agnatic lineages ==
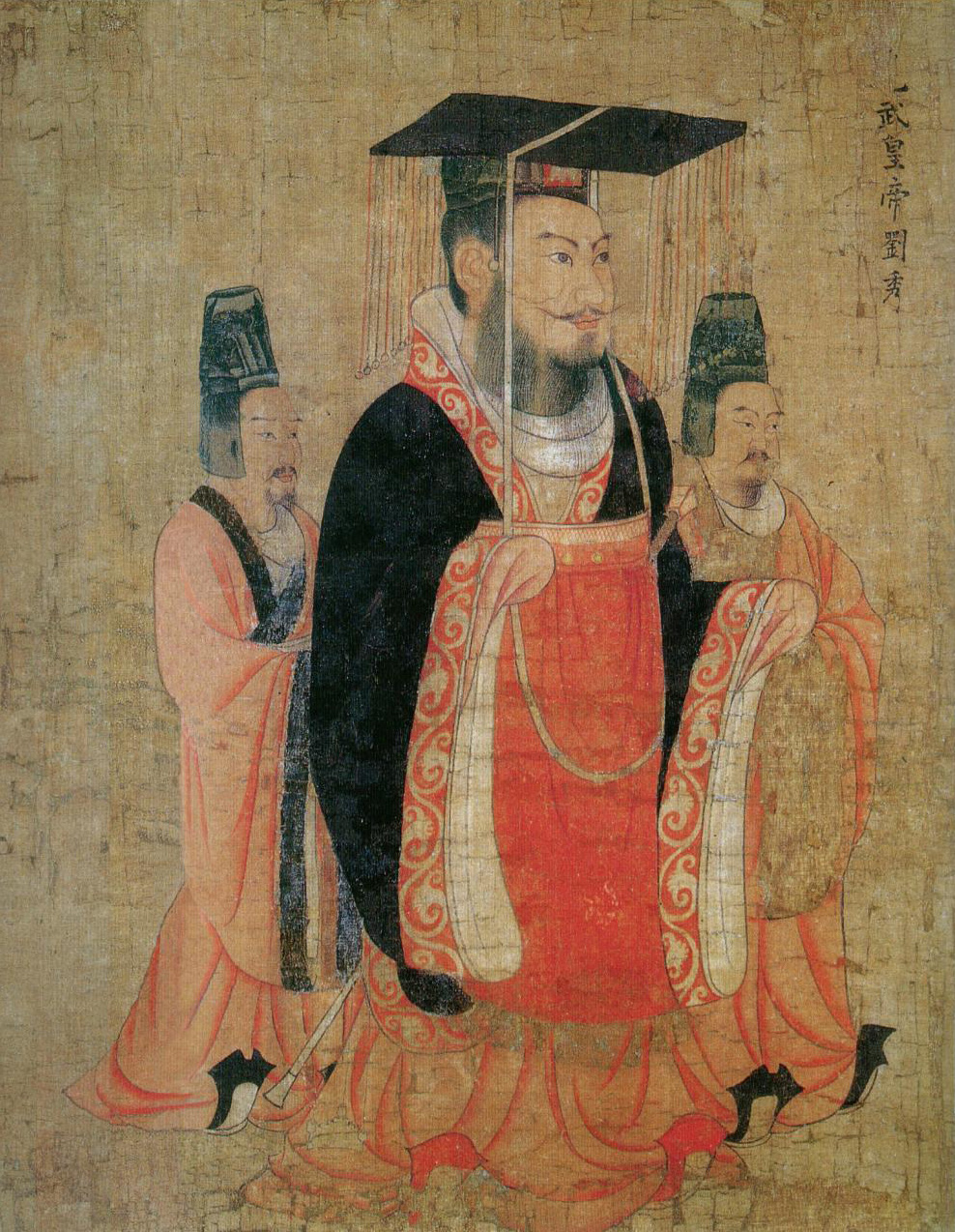
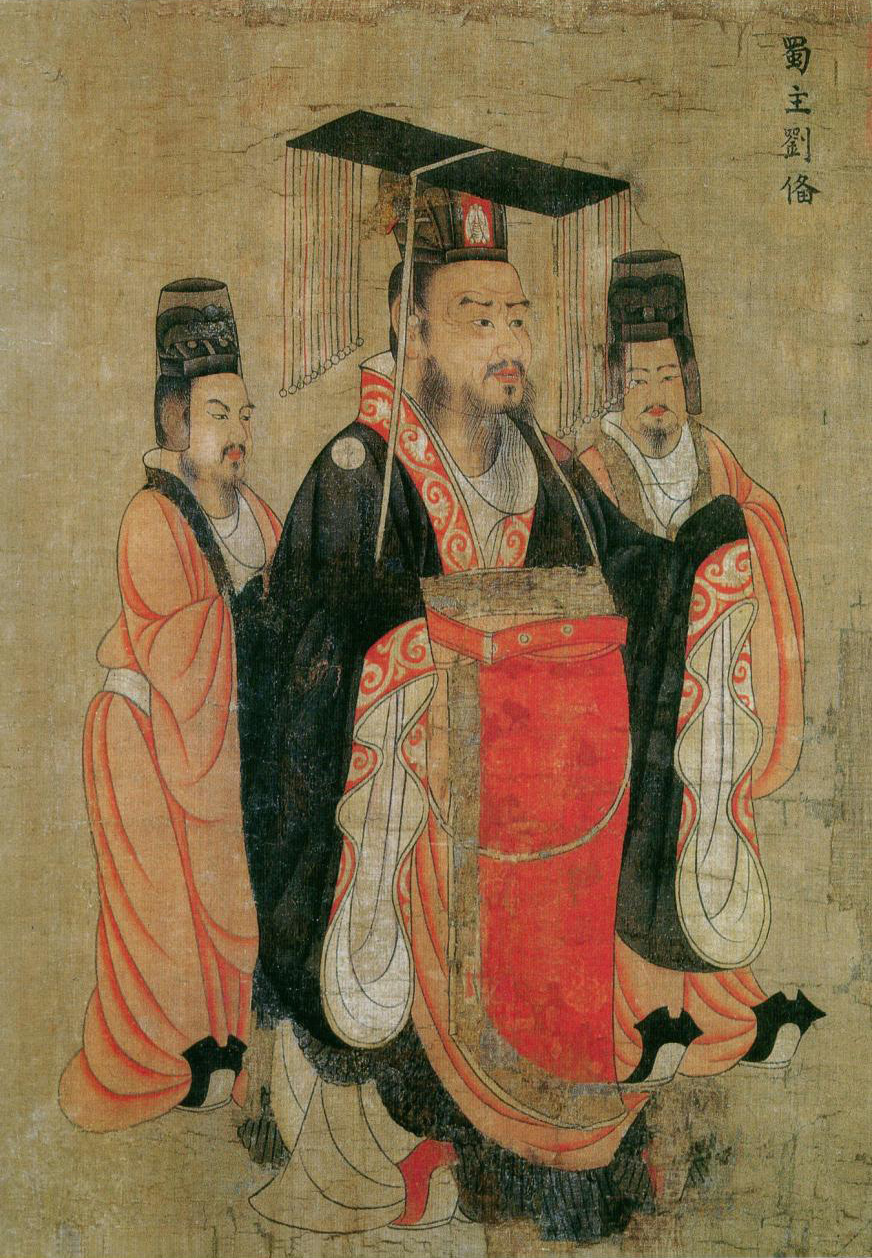
The Emperor Guangwu of Han (top) and the Emperor Zhaolie of Shu Han (bottom) were descended from a common paternal ancestor but are typically considered by historians to be the founders of two separate dynasties.

There were several groups of Chinese dynasties that were ruled by families with patrilineal relations, yet due to various reasons these regimes are considered to be separate dynasties and given distinct retroactive names for historiographical purposes. Such conditions as differences in their official dynastic title and fundamental changes having occurred to their rule would necessitate nomenclatural distinction in academia, despite these ruling clans having common ancestral origins.

Additionally, numerous other dynasties claimed descent from earlier dynasties as a calculated political move to obtain or enhance their legitimacy, even if such claims were unfounded.

The agnatic relations of the following groups of Chinese dynasties are typically recognized by historians:

- Western Zhou and Eastern Zhou
  - The Western Zhou and the Eastern Zhou were ruled by the House of Ji; they are collectively known as the Zhou dynasty
  - The founder of the Eastern Zhou, the King Ping of Zhou, was a son of the last Western Zhou ruler, the King You of Zhou
- Western Han, Eastern Han, Shu Han, and Liu Song
  - The Western Han, the Eastern Han, the Shu Han, and the Liu Song were ruled by the House of Liu; the first two of which are collectively known as the Han dynasty
  - The first emperor of the Eastern Han, the Emperor Guangwu of Han, was a ninth-generation descendant of the Western Han founder, the Emperor Gao of Han; he was also a seventh-generation descendant of the sixth Western Han monarch, the Emperor Jing of Han
  - The founder of the Shu Han, the Emperor Zhaolie of Shu Han, was also descended from the Emperor Jing of Han
  - The Book of Song states that the first Liu Song ruler, the Emperor Wu of Liu Song, was a male-line descendant of a younger brother of the Emperor Gao of Han, the Prince Yuan of Chu
- Western Jin and Eastern Jin
  - The Western Jin and the Eastern Jin were ruled by the House of Sima; they are collectively known as the Jin dynasty
  - The Eastern Jin founder, the Emperor Yuan of Jin, was a great-grandson of the Emperor Xuan of Jin; he was also a grandson of the Prince Wu of Langya and a son of the Prince Gong of Langya
- Han-Zhao and Hu Xia
  - The Han-Zhao and the Hu Xia were ruled by the House of Luandi (later renamed the House of Liu and the House of Helian respectively)
  - The Han-Zhao founder, the Emperor Guangwen of Han-Zhao, and the Hu Xia founder, the Emperor Wulie of Hu Xia, were descended from Liu Qiangqu and Liu Qubei respectively; according to the History of the Northern Dynasties, Liu Qiangqu and Liu Qubei were brothers
- Former Yan, Later Yan, and Southern Yan
  - The Former Yan, the Later Yan, and the Southern Yan were ruled by the House of Murong
  - The founder of the Later Yan, the Emperor Chengwu of Later Yan, was a son of the Former Yan founder, the Emperor Wenming of Former Yan
  - The first monarch of the Southern Yan, the Emperor Xianwu of Southern Yan, was also a son of the Emperor Wenming of Former Yan
- Northern Wei, Southern Liang, Eastern Wei, and Western Wei
  - The Northern Wei, the Southern Liang, the Eastern Wei, and the Western Wei were ruled by the House of Tuoba (later renamed the House of Yuan and the House of Tufa respectively)
  - The Northern Wei founder, the Emperor Daowu of Northern Wei, and the Southern Liang founder, the Prince Wu of Southern Liang, were respectively descended from the sons of the Emperor Shengwu of Northern Wei, the Emperor Shenyuan of Northern Wei and Tufa Pigu
  - The only ruler of the Eastern Wei, the Emperor Xiaojing of Eastern Wei, was a great-grandson of the seventh emperor of the Northern Wei, the Emperor Xiaowen of Northern Wei
  - The Western Wei founder, the Emperor Wen of Western Wei, was a grandson of the Emperor Xiaowen of Northern Wei
- Southern Qi and Liang dynasty
  - The Southern Qi and the Liang dynasty were ruled by the House of Xiao
  - The founder of the Liang dynasty, the Emperor Wu of Liang, was a son of the Emperor Wen of Liang who was a distant cousin of the Southern Qi founder, the Emperor Gao of Southern Qi
- Western Liang and Tang dynasty
  - The Western Liang and the Tang dynasty were ruled by the House of Li
  - The founder of the Tang dynasty, the Emperor Gaozu of Tang, was a seventh-generation descendant of the Western Liang founder, the Prince Wuzhao of Western Liang
- Later Han and Northern Han
  - The Later Han and the Northern Han were ruled by the House of Liu
  - The first ruler of the Northern Han, the Emperor Shizu of Northern Han, was a younger brother of the Later Han founder, the Emperor Gaozu of Later Han
- Liao dynasty and Western Liao
  - The Liao dynasty and the Western Liao were ruled by the House of Yelü
  - The Western Liao founder, the Emperor Dezong of Western Liao, was an eighth-generation descendant of the first emperor of the Liao dynasty, the Emperor Taizu of Liao
- Northern Song and Southern Song
  - The Northern Song and the Southern Song were ruled by the House of Zhao; they are collectively known as the Song dynasty
  - The first ruler of the Southern Song, the Emperor Gaozong of Song, was a son of the eighth Northern Song monarch, the Emperor Huizong of Song; he was also a younger brother of the last Northern Song emperor, the Emperor Qinzong of Song
- Yuan dynasty and Northern Yuan
  - The Yuan dynasty and the Northern Yuan were ruled by the House of Borjigin
  - The Emperor Huizong of Yuan was both the last emperor of the Yuan dynasty and the first ruler of the Northern Yuan
- Ming dynasty and Southern Ming
  - The Ming dynasty and the Southern Ming were ruled by the House of Zhu
  - The Southern Ming founder, the Hongguang Emperor, was a grandson of the 14th emperor of the Ming dynasty, the Wanli Emperor
- Later Jin and Qing dynasty
  - The Later Jin and the Qing dynasty were ruled by the House of Aisin Gioro
  - The Emperor Taizong of Qing was both the last Later Jin khan and the first emperor of the Qing dynasty

== Classification ==
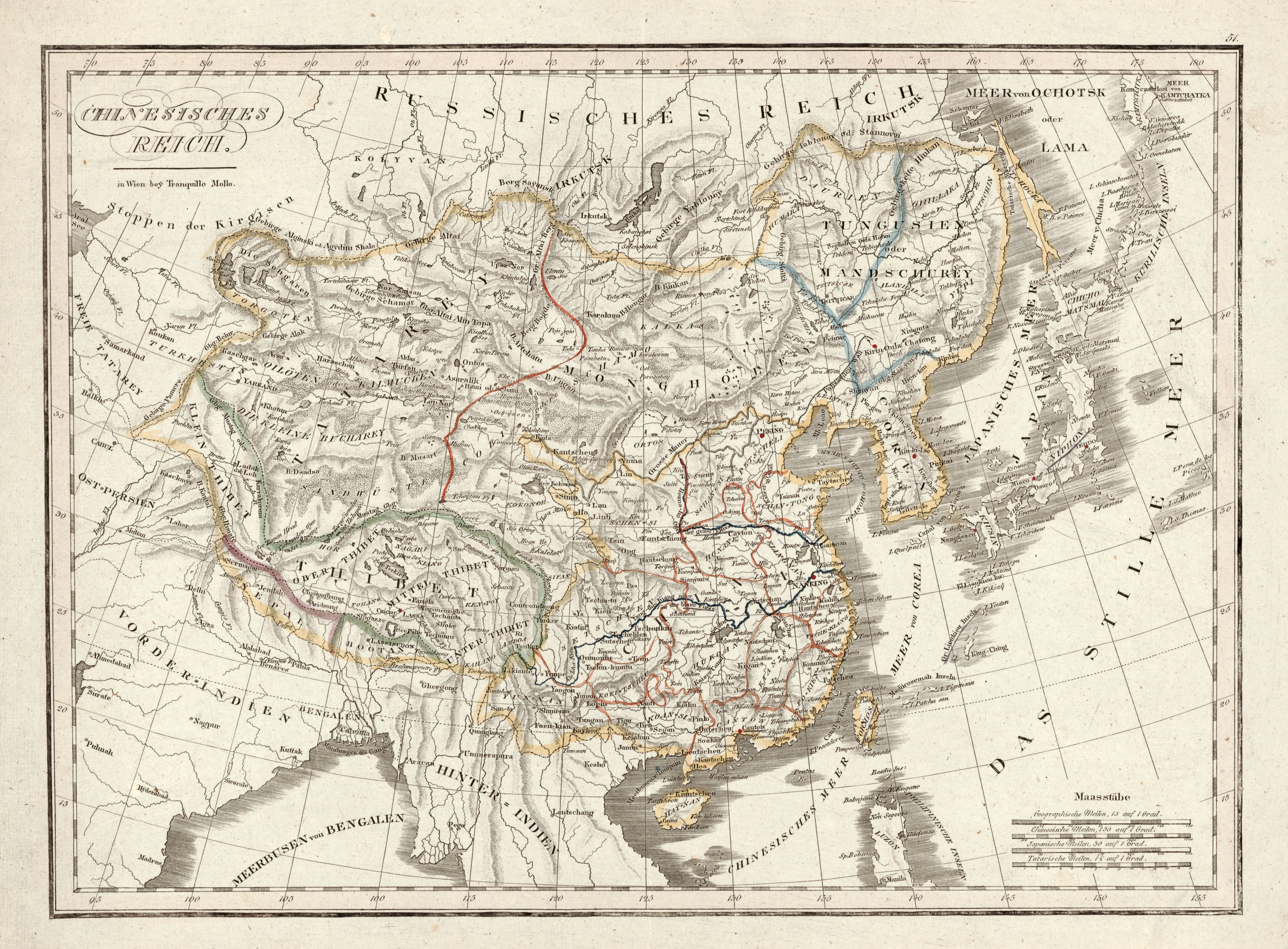
A German map of the Chinese Empire during the height of the Qing dynasty. The Qing dynasty is considered to be a "Central Plain dynasty", a "unified dynasty", and a "conquest dynasty".

=== Central Plain dynasties ===
The Central Plain is a vast area on the lower reaches of the Yellow River which formed the cradle of Chinese civilization. "Central Plain dynasties" (中原王朝; Zhōngyuán wángcháo) refer to dynasties of China that had their capital cities situated within the Central Plain. This term could refer to dynasties of both Han and non-Han ethnic origins.

=== Unified dynasties ===
"Unified dynasties" (大一統王朝; dàyītǒng wángcháo) refer to dynasties of China, regardless of their ethnic origin, that achieved the unification of China proper. "China proper" is a region generally regarded as the traditional heartland of the Han people, and is not equivalent to the term "China". Imperial dynasties that had attained the unification of China proper may be known as the "Chinese Empire" or the "Empire of China" (中華帝國; Zhōnghuá Dìguó). (Note: As proposed by scholars such as Fu Sinian and Ray Huang, there were three major Chinese empires historically. The "First Chinese Empire" (中華第一帝國) included the Qin dynasty, the Western Han, the Eastern Han, the Cao Wei, the Western Jin, the Eastern Jin, the Liu Song, the Southern Qi, the Liang dynasty, and the Chen dynasty. The "Second Chinese Empire" (中華第二帝國) encompassed the Northern Wei, the Western Wei, the Northern Zhou, the Sui dynasty, the Tang dynasty, the Later Liang, the Later Tang, the Later Jin, the Later Han, the Later Zhou, the Northern Song, and the Southern Song. The "Third Chinese Empire" (中華第三帝國) consisted of the Liao dynasty, the Jin dynasty, the Yuan dynasty, the Ming dynasty, and the Qing dynasty. Accordingly, the terms "Chinese Empire" and "Empire of China" need not necessarily refer to imperial dynasties that had unified China proper.)

The concept of "great unity" or "grand unification" (大一統; dàyītǒng) was first mentioned in the Gongyang Commentary on the Spring and Autumn Annals that was supposedly authored by the Qi scholar Gongyang Gao. Other prominent figures like Confucius and Mencius also elaborated on this concept in their respective works.

Historians typically consider the following dynasties to have unified China proper: the Qin dynasty, the Western Han, the Xin dynasty, the Eastern Han, the Western Jin, the Sui dynasty, the Tang dynasty, the Wu Zhou, the Northern Song, the Yuan dynasty, the Ming dynasty, and the Qing dynasty. The status of the Northern Song as a unified dynasty is disputed among historians as the Sixteen Prefectures of Yan and Yun were partially administered by the contemporaneous Liao dynasty while the Western Xia exercised partial control over Hetao; the Northern Song, in this sense, did not truly achieve the unification of China proper.

=== Infiltration dynasties and conquest dynasties ===
According to the historian and sinologist Karl August Wittfogel, dynasties of China founded by non-Han peoples that ruled parts or all of China proper could be classified into two types, depending on the means by which the ruling ethnic groups had entered China proper.

"Infiltration dynasties" or "dynasties of infiltration" (滲透王朝; shèntòu wángcháo) refer to Chinese dynasties founded by non-Han ethnicities that tended towards accepting Han culture and assimilating into the Han-dominant society. For instance, the Han-Zhao and the Northern Wei, established by the Xiongnu and Xianbei ethnicities respectively, are considered infiltration dynasties of China.

"Conquest dynasties" or "dynasties of conquest" (征服王朝; zhēngfú wángcháo) refer to dynasties of China established by non-Han peoples that tended towards resisting Han culture and preserving the identities of the ruling ethnicities. For example, the Liao dynasty and the Yuan dynasty, ruled by the Khitan and Mongol peoples respectively, are considered conquest dynasties of China.

These terms remain sources of controversy among scholars who believe that Chinese history should be analyzed and understood from a multiethnic and multicultural perspective.

== Naming convention ==
=== Official nomenclature ===
It was customary for Chinese monarchs to adopt an official name for the realm, known as the guóhào (國號; "name of the state"), upon the establishment of a dynasty. During the rule of a dynasty, its guóhào functioned as the formal name of the state, both internally and for diplomatic purposes.

The formal name of Chinese dynasties was usually derived from one of the following sources:

- The noble title held by the dynastic founder prior to the founding of the dynasty
  - e.g., the Emperor Wu of Chen adopted the dynastic name "Chen" from his pre-imperial title "Prince of Chen" upon the establishment of the Chen dynasty
- The name of a historical state that occupied the same geographical location as the new dynasty
  - e.g., the Former Yan was officially named "Yan" based on the ancient State of Yan located in the same region
- The name of a previous dynasty from which the new dynasty claimed descent or succession from, even if such familial link was questionable
  - e.g., the Emperor Taizu of Later Zhou officially proclaimed the Later Zhou with the official title "Zhou" as he claimed ancestry from Guo Shu, a royal of the Zhou dynasty
- A term with auspicious or other significant connotations
  - e.g., the Yuan dynasty was officially the "Great Yuan", a name derived from a clause in the Classic of Changes, "dà zāi Qián Yuán" (大哉乾元; "Great is the Heavenly and Primal")

There were instances whereby the official name was changed during the reign of a dynasty. For example, the dynasty known retroactively as Southern Han initially used the name "Yue", only to be renamed to "Han" subsequently.

The official title of several dynasties bore the character "dà" (大; "great"). In Yongzhuang Xiaopin by the Ming historian Zhu Guozhen, it was claimed that the first dynasty to do so was the Yuan dynasty. However, several sources like the History of Liao and the History of Jin compiled by the Yuan historian Toqto'a revealed that the official dynastic name of some earlier dynasties such as the Liao and the Jin also contained the character "dà". It was also common for officials, subjects, or tributary states of a particular dynasty to include the term "dà" (or an equivalent term in other languages) when referring to this dynasty as a form of respect, even if the official dynastic name did not include it. For instance, The Chronicles of Japan referred to the Tang dynasty as "Dai Tō" (大唐; "Great Tang") despite its dynastic name being simply "Tang".

While all dynasties of China sought to associate their respective realm with Zhōngguó (中國; "Central State"; usually translated as "Middle Kingdom" or "China" in English texts) and various other names of China, none of these regimes officially used such names as their dynastic title. Although the Qing dynasty explicitly identified their state with and employed "Zhōngguó"—and its Manchu equivalent "Dulimbai Gurun" (ᡩᡠᠯᡳᠮᠪᠠᡳ
ᡤᡠᡵᡠᠨ)—in official capacity in numerous international treaties beginning with the Treaty of Nerchinsk dated AD 1689, its dynastic name had remained the "Great Qing". "Zhōngguó", which has become nearly synonymous with "China" in modern times, is a concept with geographical, political, and cultural connotations.

The adoption of guóhào, as well as the importance assigned to it, had promulgated within the Sinosphere. Notably, rulers of Vietnam and Korea also declared guóhào for their respective realm.

=== Retroactive nomenclature ===
In Chinese historiography, historians generally do not refer to dynasties directly by their official name. Instead, historiographical names, which were most commonly derived from their official name, are used. For instance, the Sui dynasty is known as such because its formal name was "Sui". Likewise, the Jin dynasty was officially the "Great Jin".

When more than one dynasty shared the same Chinese character(s) as their formal name, as was common in Chinese history, prefixes are retroactively applied to dynastic names by historians in order to distinguish between these similarly-named regimes. Frequently used prefixes include:

- Cardinal direction
  - "Northern" (北; běi): e.g., Northern Qi, Northern Yuan
  - "Southern" (南; nán): e.g., Southern Yan, Southern Tang
  - "Eastern" (東; dōng): e.g., Eastern Jin, Eastern Wei
  - "Western" (西; xī): e.g., Western Liang, Western Liao
- Sequence
  - "Former" (Note: "Anterior" is employed in some sources in place of "Former".) (前; qián): e.g., Former Qin, Former Shu
  - "Later" (Note: "Latter" or "Posterior" is employed in some sources in place of "Later".) (後; hòu): e.g., Later Zhao, Later Han
- Surname of the ruling family
  - e.g., Wu Zhou, Ma Chu
- Other types of prefixes
  - e.g., Shu Han (the prefix "Shu" is a reference to the realm's geographical location at Sichuan), Hu Xia (the prefix "Hu", meaning "barbarian", refers to the dynasty's ethnic Xiongnu origin)

A dynasty could be referred to by more than one retroactive name in Chinese historiography, albeit some are more widely used than others. For instance, the Western Han is also known as the "Former Han", and the Yang Wu is also called the "Southern Wu".

Scholars usually make a historiographical distinction for dynasties whose rule were interrupted. For example, the Song dynasty is divided into the Northern Song and the Southern Song, with the Jingkang Incident as the dividing line; the original "Song" founded by the Emperor Taizu of Song was therefore differentiated from the "Song" restored under the Emperor Gaozong of Song. In such cases, the regime had collapsed, only to be re-established; a nomenclatural distinction between the original regime and the new regime is thus necessary for historiographical purpose. Major exceptions to this historiographical practice include the Western Qin, the Southern Liang, and the Tang dynasty; the first two were interrupted by the Later Qin, while the continuity of the latter was broken by the Wu Zhou.

In Chinese sources, the term "dynasty" (朝; cháo) is usually omitted when referencing dynasties that have prefixes in their historiographical names. Such a practice is sometimes adopted in English usage, even though the inclusion of the word "dynasty" is also widely seen in English scholarly writings. For example, the Northern Zhou is also sometimes referred to as the "Northern Zhou dynasty".

Often, scholars would refer to a specific Chinese dynasty by attaching the word "China" after the dynastic name. For instance, "Tang China" refers to the Chinese state under the rule of the Tang dynasty and the corresponding historical era.

== Territorial extent ==
Approximate territories controlled by the various dynasties and states throughout Chinese history, juxtaposed with the modern Chinese borders.

While the earliest orthodox Chinese dynasties were established along the Yellow River and the Yangtze in China proper, numerous Chinese dynasties later expanded beyond the region to encompass other territorial domains.

At various points in time, Chinese dynasties exercised control over China proper (including Hainan, Macau, and Hong Kong), Taiwan, Manchuria (both Inner Manchuria and Outer Manchuria), Sakhalin, Mongolia (both Inner Mongolia and Outer Mongolia), Vietnam, Tibet, Xinjiang, as well as parts of Central Asia, the Korean Peninsula, Afghanistan, and Siberia.

Territorially, the largest orthodox Chinese dynasty was either the Yuan dynasty or the Qing dynasty, depending on the historical source. This discrepancy can be mainly attributed to the ambiguous northern border of the Yuan realm: whereas some sources describe the Yuan border as located to the immediate north of the northern shore of Lake Baikal, others posit that the Yuan dynasty reached as far north as the Arctic coast, with its western boundary with the Golden Horde in Siberia delimited by the Ob and the Irtysh. In contrast, the borders of the Qing dynasty were demarcated and reinforced through a series of international treaties, and thus were more well-defined.

Apart from exerting direct control over the Chinese realm, various dynasties of China also maintained hegemony over other states and tribes through the Chinese tributary system. The Chinese tributary system first emerged during the Western Han and lasted until the 19th century AD when the Sinocentric order broke down.

The modern territorial claims of both the People's Republic of China and the Republic of China are inherited from the lands once held by the Qing dynasty at the time of its collapse.

== List of major Chinese dynasties ==
This list only includes the major dynasties of China that are typically found in simplified forms of Chinese historical timelines. This list is neither comprehensive nor representative of Chinese history as a whole.

Major dynasties of China
Dynasty	Ruling house			Period of rule		Rulers		
Name (Note: The English and Chinese names stated are historiographical denominations. These should not be confused with the guóhào officially proclaimed by each dynasty. A dynasty may be known by more than one historiographical name.) (English (Note: The English names shown are based on the Hanyu Pinyin renditions, the most common form of Mandarin romanization currently in adoption. Some scholarly works utilize the Wade–Giles system, which may differ drastically in the spelling of certain words. For instance, the Qing dynasty is rendered as "Ch῾ing dynasty" in Wade–Giles.) / Chinese (Note: The Chinese characters shown are in Traditional Chinese. Some characters may have simplified versions that are currently used in mainland China. For instance, the characters for the Eastern Han are written as "東漢" in Traditional Chinese and "东汉" in Simplified Chinese.) / Hanyu Pinyin / Wade–Giles / Bopomofo)	Surname (English / Chinese)	Ethnicity (Note: While Chinese historiography tends to treat dynasties as being of specific ethnic stocks, there were some monarchs who had mixed heritage. For instance, the Jiaqing Emperor of the Manchu-led Qing dynasty was of mixed Manchu and Han descent, having derived his Han ancestry from his mother, the Empress Xiaoyichun.)	Status (Note: The status of a dynasty was dependent upon the supreme title bore by its monarch at any given time. For instance, since all monarchs of the Chen dynasty held the title of emperor during their reign, the Chen dynasty was of imperial status.)	Year	Term	Founder (Note: The monarchs listed were the de facto founders of dynasties. However, it was common for Chinese monarchs to posthumously honor earlier members of the family as monarchs. For instance, while the Later Jin was officially established by the Emperor Gaozu of Later Jin, four earlier members of the ruling house were posthumously accorded imperial titles, the most senior of which was Shi Jing who was conferred the temple name "Jingzu" (靖祖) and the posthumous name "Emperor Xiao'an" (孝安皇帝).)	Last monarch	List / Family tree
Semi-legendary
Xia dynasty 夏朝; Xià Cháo; Hsia^{4} Ch῾ao^{2} ㄒㄧㄚˋ ㄔㄠˊ	Si (Note: In addition to the ancestral name Si (姒), the ruling house of the Xia dynasty also bore the lineage name Xiahou (夏后).) (Note: Youqiong Yi, surnamed Youqiong (有窮), was of Dongyi descent. His enthronement was therefore not a typical dynastic succession.) (Note: Yun Zhuo, surnamed Yun (妘), was of Dongyi descent. His enthronement was therefore not a typical dynastic succession.) 姒	Huaxia	Royal	2070–1600 BC (Note: The dates given for the Xia dynasty, the Shang dynasty, and the Western Zhou prior to the start of the Gonghe Regency in 841 BC are derived from the Xia–Shang–Zhou Chronology Project.) (Note: The rule of the Xia dynasty was traditionally dated 2205–1766 BC as per the calculations made by the historian Liu Xin. Accordingly, the Xia dynasty lasted 439 years.)	470 years	Yu of Xia	Jie of Xia	(list) (tree)
Ancient China
Shang dynasty 商朝; Shāng Cháo; Shang^{1} Ch῾ao^{2} ㄕㄤ ㄔㄠˊ	Zi 子	Huaxia	Royal	1600–1046 BC (Note: The rule of the Shang dynasty was traditionally dated 1766–1122 BC as per the calculations made by the historian Liu Xin. Accordingly, the Shang dynasty lasted 644 years.)	554 years	Tang of Shang	Zhou of Shang	(list) (tree)
Western Zhou (Note: The Western Zhou (西周) and the Eastern Zhou (東周) are collectively known as the Zhou dynasty (周朝; Zhōu Cháo; Chou^{1} Ch῾ao^{2}; ㄓㄡ ㄔㄠˊ).) 西周; Xī Zhōu; Hsi^{1} Chou^{1} ㄒㄧ ㄓㄡ	Ji 姬	Huaxia	Royal	1046–771 BC (Note: The rule of the Western Zhou was traditionally dated 1122–771 BC as per the calculations made by the historian Liu Xin. Accordingly, the Western Zhou lasted 351 years.)	275 years	Wu of Zhou	You of Zhou	(list) (tree)
Eastern Zhou 東周; Dōng Zhōu; Tung^{1} Chou^{1} ㄉㄨㄥ ㄓㄡ	Ji 姬	Huaxia	Royal	770–256 BC	514 years	Ping of Zhou	Nan of Zhou	(list) (tree)
Early Imperial China (Note: The terms "Chinese Empire" and "Empire of China" usually refer to the Chinese state under the rule of various imperial dynasties, particularly those that had unified China proper.)
Qin dynasty 秦朝; Qín Cháo; Ch῾in^{2} Ch῾ao^{2} ㄑㄧㄣˊ ㄔㄠˊ	Ying (Note: In addition to the ancestral name Ying (嬴), the ruling house of the Qin dynasty also bore the lineage name Zhao (趙).) 嬴	Huaxia	Imperial (221–207 BC) Royal (207 BC)	221–207 BC	14 years	Qin Shi Huang	Ying Ziying	(list) (tree)
Western Han (Note: The Western Han (西漢) and the Eastern Han (東漢) are collectively known as the Han dynasty (漢朝; Hàn Cháo; Han^{4} Ch῾ao^{2}; ㄏㄢˋ ㄔㄠˊ).) 西漢; Xī Hàn; Hsi^{1} Han^{4} ㄒㄧ ㄏㄢˋ	Liu 劉	Han	Imperial	202 BC–AD 9 (Note: Some historians consider 206 BC, the year in which the Emperor Gao of Han was proclaimed "King of Han", to be the start of the Western Han. Accordingly, the Western Han lasted 215 years.)	211 years	Gao of Han	Liu Ying (Note: Liu Ying was not officially enthroned and maintained the title huáng tàizǐ (皇太子; "crown prince") during the regency of Wang Mang. The last Western Han monarch who was officially enthroned was the Emperor Ping of Han.)	(list) (tree)
Xin dynasty 新朝; Xīn Cháo; Hsin^{1} Ch῾ao^{2} ㄒㄧㄣ ㄔㄠˊ	Wang 王	Han	Imperial	AD 9–23	14 years	Wang Mang		(list) (tree)
Eastern Han 東漢; Dōng Hàn; Tung^{1} Han^{4} ㄉㄨㄥ ㄏㄢˋ	Liu 劉	Han	Imperial	AD 25–220	195 years	Guangwu of Han	Xian of Han	(list) (tree)
Three Kingdoms 三國; Sān Guó; San^{1} Kuo^{2} ㄙㄢ ㄍㄨㄛˊ				AD 220–280	60 years			(list) (tree)
Cao Wei 曹魏; Cáo Wèi; Ts῾ao^{2} Wei^{4} ㄘㄠˊ ㄨㄟˋ	Cao 曹	Han	Imperial	AD 220–266	46 years	Wen of Cao Wei	Yuan of Cao Wei	(list) (tree)
Shu Han 蜀漢; Shǔ Hàn; Shu^{3} Han^{4} ㄕㄨˇ ㄏㄢˋ	Liu 劉	Han	Imperial	AD 221–263	42 years	Zhaolie of Shu Han	Huai of Shu Han	(list) (tree)
Eastern Wu 東吳; Dōng Wú; Tung^{1} Wu^{2} ㄉㄨㄥ ㄨˊ	Sun 孫	Han	Royal (AD 222–229) Imperial (AD 229–280)	AD 222–280	58 years	Da of Eastern Wu	Sun Hao	(list) (tree)
Western Jin (Note: The Western Jin (西晉) and the Eastern Jin (東晉) are collectively known as the Jin dynasty (晉朝; Jìn Cháo; Chin^{4} Ch῾ao^{2}; ㄐㄧㄣˋ ㄔㄠˊ).) (Note: The names of the Jin dynasty (晉朝) of the Sima clan and the Jin dynasty (金朝) of the Wanyan clan are rendered similarly using the Hanyu Pinyin system, even though they do not share the same Chinese character for "Jin".) 西晉; Xī Jìn; Hsi^{1} Chin^{4} ㄒㄧ ㄐㄧㄣˋ	Sima 司馬	Han	Imperial	AD 266–316	50 years	Wu of Jin	Min of Jin	(list) (tree)
Eastern Jin 東晉; Dōng Jìn; Tung^{1} Chin^{4} ㄉㄨㄥ ㄐㄧㄣˋ	Sima 司馬	Han	Imperial	AD 317–420	103 years	Yuan of Jin	Gong of Jin	(list) (tree)
Sixteen Kingdoms (Note: The Sixteen Kingdoms are also referred to as the "Sixteen Kingdoms of the Five Barbarians" (五胡十六國; Wǔ Hú Shíliù Guó), although not all dynasties counted among the 16 were ruled by the "Five Barbarians".) 十六國; Shíliù Guó; Shih^{2}-liu^{4} Kuo^{2} ㄕˊ ㄌㄧㄡˋ ㄍㄨㄛˊ				AD 304–439	135 years			(list) (tree)
Han-Zhao 漢趙; Hàn Zhào; Han^{4} Chao^{4} ㄏㄢˋ ㄓㄠˋ	Liu (Note: The ruling house of the Han-Zhao initially bore the surname Luandi (攣鞮). Liu (劉) was subsequently adopted as the surname prior to the establishment of the Han-Zhao.) (Note: As Jin Zhun, surnamed Jin (靳), was not a member of the Liu (劉) clan by birth, his enthronement was not a typical dynastic succession.) 劉	Xiongnu	Royal (AD 304–308) Imperial (AD 308–329)	AD 304–329	25 years	Guangwen of Han-Zhao	Liu Yao	(list) (tree)
Cheng-Han 成漢; Chéng Hàn; Ch῾eng^{2} Han^{4} ㄔㄥˊ ㄏㄢˋ	Li 李	Di	Princely (AD 304–306) Imperial (AD 306–347)	AD 304–347 (Note: Some historians consider AD 303, the year in which the Emperor Jing of Cheng-Han declared the era name "Jianchu" (建初), to be the start of the Cheng-Han. Accordingly, the Cheng-Han was founded by the Emperor Jing of Cheng-Han and lasted 44 years.)	43 years	Wu of Cheng-Han	Li Shi	(list) (tree)
Later Zhao 後趙; Hòu Zhào; Hou^{4} Chao^{4} ㄏㄡˋ ㄓㄠˋ	Shi 石	Jie	Royal (AD 319–330) Imperial (AD 330–351) Princely (AD 351)	AD 319–351	32 years	Ming of Later Zhao	Shi Zhi	(list) (tree)
Former Liang 前涼; Qián Liáng; Ch῾ien^{2} Liang^{2} ㄑㄧㄢˊ ㄌㄧㄤˊ	Zhang 張	Han	Princely (AD 320–354, AD 355–363) Imperial (AD 354–355) Ducal (AD 363–376)	AD 320–376	56 years	Cheng of Former Liang	Dao of Former Liang	(list) (tree)
Former Yan 前燕; Qián Yān; Ch῾ien^{2} Yen^{1} ㄑㄧㄢˊ ㄧㄢ	Murong 慕容	Xianbei	Princely (AD 337–353) Imperial (AD 353–370)	AD 337–370	33 years	Wenming of Former Yan	You of Former Yan	(list) (tree)
Former Qin 前秦; Qián Qín; Ch῾ien^{2} Ch῾in^{2} ㄑㄧㄢˊ ㄑㄧㄣˊ	Fu (Note: The ruling house of the Former Qin initially bore the surname Pu (蒲). The Emperor Huiwu of Former Qin subsequently adopted Fu (苻) as the surname in AD 349 prior to the establishment of the Former Qin.) 苻	Di	Imperial	AD 351–394 (Note: Some historians consider AD 350, the year in which the Emperor Huiwu of Former Qin was proclaimed "Prince of Three Qins", to be the start of the Former Qin. Accordingly, the Former Qin was founded by the Emperor Huiwu of Former Qin and lasted 44 years.)	43 years	Jingming of Former Qin	Fu Chong	(list) (tree)
Later Yan 後燕; Hòu Yān; Hou^{4} Yen^{1} ㄏㄡˋ ㄧㄢ	Murong (Note: As Lan Han, surnamed Lan (蘭), was not a member of the Murong (慕容) clan by birth, his enthronement was not a typical dynastic succession.) (Note: The Emperor Huiyi of Yan was of Gaogouli descent. Originally surnamed Gao (高), he was an adopted member of the Murong (慕容) clan. His enthronement was therefore not a typical dynastic succession.) 慕容	Xianbei	Princely (AD 384–386) Imperial (AD 386–409)	AD 384–409 (Note: Depending on the status of the Emperor Huiyi of Yan, the Later Yan ended in either AD 407 or AD 409 and lasted either 23 years or 25 years.)	25 years	Chengwu of Later Yan	Zhaowen of Later Yan Huiyi of Yan (Note: The Emperor Huiyi of Yan could either be the last Later Yan monarch or the founder of the Northern Yan depending on the historian's characterization.)	(list) (tree)
Later Qin 後秦; Hòu Qín; Hou^{4} Ch῾in^{2} ㄏㄡˋ ㄑㄧㄣˊ	Yao 姚	Qiang	Royal (AD 384–386) Imperial (AD 386–417)	AD 384–417	33 years	Wuzhao of Later Qin	Yao Hong	(list) (tree)
Western Qin 西秦; Xī Qín; Hsi^{1} Ch῾in^{2} ㄒㄧ ㄑㄧㄣˊ	Qifu 乞伏	Xianbei	Princely	AD 385–400, AD 409–431	37 years (Note: The Western Qin was interrupted by the Later Qin between AD 400 and AD 409. Chinese historiography does not make a distinction between the realm that existed up to AD 400 and the realm restored in AD 409. The Prince Wuyuan of Western Qin was both the last ruler before the interregnum and the first ruler after the interregnum.)	Xuanlie of Western Qin	Qifu Mumo	(list) (tree)
Later Liang (Note: The names of the Later Liang (後涼) of the Lü clan and the Later Liang (後梁) of the Zhu clan are rendered similarly using the Hanyu Pinyin system, even though they do not share the same Chinese character for "Liang".) 後涼; Hòu Liáng; Hou^{4} Liang^{2} ㄏㄡˋ ㄌㄧㄤˊ	Lü 呂	Di	Ducal (AD 386–389) Princely (AD 389–396) Imperial (AD 396–403)	AD 386–403	17 years	Yiwu of Later Liang	Lü Long	(list) (tree)
Southern Liang 南涼; Nán Liáng; Nan^{2} Liang^{2} ㄋㄢˊ ㄌㄧㄤˊ	Tufa (Note: The ruling house of the Southern Liang initially bore the surname Tuoba (拓跋). Tufa Pigu subsequently adopted Tufa (禿髮) as the surname prior to the establishment of the Southern Liang.) 禿髮	Xianbei	Princely	AD 397–404, AD 408–414	13 years (Note: The Southern Liang was interrupted by the Later Qin between AD 404 and AD 408. Chinese historiography does not make a distinction between the realm that existed up to AD 404 and the realm restored in AD 408. The Prince Jing of Southern Liang was both the last ruler before the interregnum and the first ruler after the interregnum.)	Wu of Southern Liang	Jing of Southern Liang	(list) (tree)
Northern Liang 北涼; Běi Liáng; Pei^{3} Liang^{2} ㄅㄟˇ ㄌㄧㄤˊ	Juqu (Note: Duan Ye, surnamed Duan (段), was of Han descent. The enthronement of the Prince Wuxuan of Northern Liang was therefore not a typical dynastic succession.) 沮渠	Lushuihu	Ducal (AD 397–399, AD 401–412) Princely (AD 399–401, AD 412–439)	AD 397–439	42 years	Duan Ye	Ai of Northern Liang	(list) (tree)
Southern Yan 南燕; Nán Yān; Nan^{2} Yen^{1} ㄋㄢˊ ㄧㄢ	Murong 慕容	Xianbei	Princely (AD 398–400) Imperial (AD 400–410)	AD 398–410	12 years	Xianwu of Southern Yan	Murong Chao	(list) (tree)
Western Liang 西涼; Xī Liáng; Hsi^{1} Liang^{2} ㄒㄧ ㄌㄧㄤˊ	Li 李	Han	Ducal	AD 400–421	21 years	Wuzhao of Western Liang	Li Xun	(list) (tree)
Hu Xia 胡夏; Hú Xià; Hu^{2} Hsia^{4} ㄏㄨˊ ㄒㄧㄚˋ	Helian (Note: The ruling house of the Hu Xia initially bore the surname Luandi (攣鞮). Liu (劉) was adopted as the surname prior to the establishment of the Hu Xia. The Emperor Wulie of Hu Xia subsequently adopted Helian (赫連) as the surname in AD 413 after the establishment of the Hu Xia.) 赫連	Xiongnu	Imperial	AD 407–431	24 years	Wulie of Hu Xia	Helian Ding	(list) (tree)
Northern Yan 北燕; Běi Yān; Pei^{3} Yen^{1} ㄅㄟˇ ㄧㄢ	Feng (Note: The Emperor Huiyi of Yan was of Gaogouli descent. Originally surnamed Gao (高), he was an adopted member of the Murong (慕容) clan. The enthronement of the Emperor Wencheng of Northern Yan was therefore not a typical dynastic succession.) 馮	Han	Imperial	AD 407–436 (Note: Depending on the status of the Emperor Huiyi of Yan, the Northern Yan was established in either AD 407 or AD 409 and lasted either 29 years or 27 years.)	29 years	Huiyi of Yan Wencheng of Northern Yan	Zhaocheng of Northern Yan	(list) (tree)
Northern dynasties 北朝; Běi Cháo; Pei^{3} Ch῾ao^{2} ㄅㄟˇ ㄔㄠˊ				AD 386–581	195 years			(list) (tree)
Northern Wei 北魏; Běi Wèi; Pei^{3} Wei^{4} ㄅㄟˇ ㄨㄟˋ	Tuoba (Note: The ruling house of the Northern Wei initially bore the surname Tuoba (拓跋). The Emperor Xiaowen of Northern Wei subsequently adopted Yuan (元) as the surname in AD 493 after the establishment of the Northern Wei.) 拓跋	Xianbei	Princely (AD 386–399) Imperial (AD 399–535)	AD 386–535	149 years	Daowu of Northern Wei	Xiaowu of Northern Wei	(list) (tree)
Eastern Wei 東魏; Dōng Wèi; Tung^{1} Wei^{4} ㄉㄨㄥ ㄨㄟˋ	Yuan (Note: The ruling house of the Eastern Wei initially bore the surname Tuoba (拓跋). The Emperor Xiaowen of Northern Wei subsequently adopted Yuan (元) as the surname in AD 493 prior to the establishment of the Eastern Wei.) 元	Xianbei	Imperial	AD 534–550	16 years	Xiaojing of Eastern Wei		(list) (tree)
Western Wei 西魏; Xī Wèi; Hsi^{1} Wei^{4} ㄒㄧ ㄨㄟˋ	Yuan (Note: The ruling house of the Western Wei initially bore the surname Tuoba (拓跋). The Emperor Xiaowen of Northern Wei subsequently adopted Yuan (元) as the surname in AD 493 prior to the establishment of the Western Wei, only for the Emperor Gong of Western Wei to restore the surname Tuoba in AD 554 after the establishment of the Western Wei.) 元	Xianbei	Imperial	AD 535–557	22 years	Wen of Western Wei	Gong of Western Wei	(list) (tree)
Northern Qi 北齊; Běi Qí; Pei^{3} Ch῾i^{2} ㄅㄟˇ ㄑㄧˊ	Gao 高	Han	Imperial	AD 550–577	27 years	Wenxuan of Northern Qi	Gao Heng	(list) (tree)
Northern Zhou 北周; Běi Zhōu; Pei^{3} Chou^{1} ㄅㄟˇ ㄓㄡ	Yuwen 宇文	Xianbei	Imperial	AD 557–581	24 years	Xiaomin of Northern Zhou	Jing of Northern Zhou	(list) (tree)
Southern dynasties 南朝; Nán Cháo; Nan^{2} Ch῾ao^{2} ㄋㄢˊ ㄔㄠˊ				AD 420–589	169 years			(list) (tree)
Liu Song 劉宋; Liú Sòng; Liu^{2} Sung^{4} ㄌㄧㄡˊ ㄙㄨㄥˋ	Liu 劉	Han	Imperial	AD 420–479	59 years	Wu of Liu Song	Shun of Liu Song	(list) (tree)
Southern Qi 南齊; Nán Qí; Nan^{2} Ch῾i^{2} ㄋㄢˊ ㄑㄧˊ	Xiao 蕭	Han	Imperial	AD 479–502	23 years	Gao of Southern Qi	He of Southern Qi	(list) (tree)
Liang dynasty 梁朝; Liáng Cháo; Liang^{2} Ch῾ao^{2} ㄌㄧㄤˊ ㄔㄠˊ	Xiao 蕭	Han	Imperial	AD 502–557	55 years	Wu of Liang	Jing of Liang	(list) (tree)
Chen dynasty 陳朝; Chén Cháo; Ch῾en^{2} Ch῾ao^{2} ㄔㄣˊ ㄔㄠˊ	Chen 陳	Han	Imperial	AD 557–589	32 years	Wu of Chen	Chen Shubao	(list) (tree)
Middle Imperial China
Sui dynasty 隋朝; Suí Cháo; Sui^{2} Ch῾ao^{2} ㄙㄨㄟˊ ㄔㄠˊ	Yang (Note: The ruling house of the Sui dynasty initially bore the surname Yang (楊). The Western Wei later bestowed the surname Puliuru (普六茹) upon the family. The Emperor Wen of Sui subsequently restored Yang as the surname in AD 580 prior to the establishment of the Sui dynasty.) 楊	Han	Imperial	AD 581–619	38 years	Wen of Sui	Gong of Sui	(list) (tree)
Tang dynasty 唐朝; Táng Cháo; T῾ang^{2} Ch῾ao^{2} ㄊㄤˊ ㄔㄠˊ	Li (Note: The ruling house of the Tang dynasty initially bore the surname Li (李). The Western Wei later bestowed the surname Daye (大野) upon the family. Li was subsequently restored as the surname in AD 580 prior to the establishment of the Tang dynasty.) 李	Han	Imperial	AD 618–690, AD 705–907	274 years (Note: The Tang dynasty was interrupted by the Wu Zhou between AD 690 and AD 705. Chinese historiography does not make a distinction between the realm that existed up to AD 690 and the realm restored in AD 705. The Emperor Ruizong of Tang was the last ruler before the interregnum; the Emperor Zhongzong of Tang was the first ruler after the interregnum.)	Gaozu of Tang	Ai of Tang	(list) (tree)
Wu Zhou 武周; Wǔ Zhōu; Wu^{3} Chou^{1} ㄨˇ ㄓㄡ	Wu 武	Han	Imperial	AD 690–705	15 years	Shengshen of Wu Zhou		(list) (tree)
Five Dynasties 五代; Wǔ Dài; Wu^{3} Tai^{4} ㄨˇ ㄉㄞˋ				AD 907–960	53 years			(list) (tree)
Later Liang 後梁; Hòu Liáng; Hou^{4} Liang^{2} ㄏㄡˋ ㄌㄧㄤˊ	Zhu 朱	Han	Imperial	AD 907–923	16 years	Taizu of Later Liang	Zhu Youzhen	(list) (tree)
Later Tang 後唐; Hòu Táng; Hou^{4} T῾ang^{2} ㄏㄡˋ ㄊㄤˊ	Li (Note: The ruling house of the Later Tang initially bore the surname Zhuye (朱邪). The Emperor Xianzu of Later Tang subsequently adopted Li (李) as the surname in AD 869 prior to the establishment of the Later Tang.) (Note: The Emperor Mingzong of Later Tang, originally without surname, was an adopted member of the Li (李) clan. His enthronement was therefore not a typical dynastic succession.) (Note: Li Congke was of Han descent. Originally surnamed Wang (王), he was an adopted member of the Li (李) clan. His enthronement was therefore not a typical dynastic succession.) 李	Shatuo	Imperial	AD 923–937	14 years	Zhuangzong of Later Tang	Li Congke	(list) (tree)
Later Jin (Note: The names of the Later Jin (後晉) of the Shi clan and the Later Jin (後金) of the Aisin Gioro clan are rendered similarly using the Hanyu Pinyin system, even though they do not share the same Chinese character for "Jin".) 後晉; Hòu Jìn; Hou^{4} Chin^{4} ㄏㄡˋ ㄐㄧㄣˋ	Shi 石	Shatuo	Imperial	AD 936–947	11 years	Gaozu of Later Jin	Chu of Later Jin	(list) (tree)
Later Han 後漢; Hòu Hàn; Hou^{4} Han^{4} ㄏㄡˋ ㄏㄢˋ	Liu 劉	Shatuo	Imperial	AD 947–951	4 years	Gaozu of Later Han	Yin of Later Han	(list) (tree)
Later Zhou 後周; Hòu Zhōu; Hou^{4} Chou^{1} ㄏㄡˋ ㄓㄡ	Guo (Note: The Emperor Shizong of Later Zhou, originally surnamed Chai (柴), was an adopted member of the Guo (郭) clan. His enthronement was therefore not a typical dynastic succession.) 郭	Han	Imperial	AD 951–960	9 years	Taizu of Later Zhou	Gong of Later Zhou	(list) (tree)
Ten Kingdoms 十國; Shí Guó; Shih^{2} Kuo^{2} ㄕˊ ㄍㄨㄛˊ				AD 907–979	72 years			(list) (tree)
Former Shu 前蜀; Qián Shǔ; Ch῾ien^{2} Shu^{3} ㄑㄧㄢˊ ㄕㄨˇ	Wang 王	Han	Imperial	AD 907–925	18 years	Gaozu of Former Shu	Wang Yan	(list) (tree)
Yang Wu 楊吳; Yáng Wú; Yang^{2} Wu^{2} ㄧㄤˊ ㄨˊ	Yang 楊	Han	Princely (AD 907–919) Royal (AD 919–927) Imperial (AD 927–937)	AD 907–937 (Note: Some historians consider AD 902, the year in which the Emperor Taizu of Yang Wu was proclaimed "Prince of Wu", to be the start of the Yang Wu. Accordingly, the Yang Wu was founded by the Emperor Taizu of Yang Wu and lasted 35 years.)	30 years	Liezu of Yang Wu	Rui of Yang Wu	(list) (tree)
Ma Chu 馬楚; Mǎ Chǔ; Ma^{3} Ch῾u^{3} ㄇㄚˇ ㄔㄨˇ	Ma 馬	Han	Royal (AD 907–930) Princely (AD 930–951)	AD 907–951	44 years	Wumu of Ma Chu	Ma Xichong	(list) (tree)
Wuyue 吳越; Wúyuè; Wu^{2}-yüeh^{4} ㄨˊ ㄩㄝˋ	Qian 錢	Han	Royal (AD 907–932, AD 937–978) Princely (AD 934–937)	AD 907–978	71 years	Taizu of Wuyue	Zhongyi of Qin	(list) (tree)
Min 閩 Mǐn; Min^{3} ㄇㄧㄣˇ	Wang (Note: As Zhu Wenjin, surnamed Zhu (朱), was not a member of the Wang (王) clan by birth, his enthronement was not a typical dynastic succession.) 王	Han	Princely (AD 909–933, AD 944–945) Imperial (AD 933–944, AD 945)	AD 909–945	36 years	Taizu of Min	Tiande	(list) (tree)
Southern Han 南漢; Nán Hàn; Nan^{2} Han^{4} ㄋㄢˊ ㄏㄢˋ	Liu 劉	Han	Imperial	AD 917–971	54 years	Gaozu of Southern Han	Liu Chang	(list) (tree)
Jingnan 荊南; Jīngnán; Ching^{1}-nan^{2} ㄐㄧㄥ ㄋㄢˊ	Gao (Note: The ruling house of the Jingnan initially bore the surname Gao (高). The Prince Wuxin of Chu subsequently adopted Zhu (朱) as the surname, only to restore the surname Gao prior to the establishment of the Jingnan.) 高	Han	Princely	AD 924–963	39 years	Wuxin of Chu	Gao Jichong	(list) (tree)
Later Shu 後蜀; Hòu Shǔ; Hou^{4} Shu^{3} ㄏㄡˋ ㄕㄨˇ	Meng 孟	Han	Imperial	AD 934–965	31 years	Gaozu of Later Shu	Gongxiao of Chu	(list) (tree)
Southern Tang 南唐; Nán Táng; Nan^{2} T῾ang^{2} ㄋㄢˊ ㄊㄤˊ	Li (Note: The ruling house of the Southern Tang initially bore the surname Li (李). The Emperor Liezu of Southern Tang subsequently adopted Xu (徐) as the surname, only to restore the surname Li in AD 939 after the establishment of the Southern Tang.) 李	Han	Imperial (AD 937–958) Royal (AD 958–976)	AD 937–976	37 years	Liezu of Southern Tang	Li Yu	(list) (tree)
Northern Han 北漢; Běi Hàn; Pei^{3} Han^{4} ㄅㄟˇ ㄏㄢˋ	Liu (Note: Liu Ji'en was of Han descent. Originally surnamed Xue (薛), he was an adopted member of the Liu (劉) clan. His enthronement was therefore not a typical dynastic succession.) (Note: The Emperor Yingwu of Northern Han was of Han descent. Originally surnamed He (何), he was an adopted member of the Liu (劉) clan. His enthronement was therefore not a typical dynastic succession.) 劉	Shatuo	Imperial	AD 951–979	28 years	Shizu of Northern Han	Yingwu of Northern Han	(list) (tree)
Liao dynasty 遼朝; Liáo Cháo; Liao^{2} Ch῾ao^{2} ㄌㄧㄠˊ ㄔㄠˊ	Yelü 耶律 (𘬜𘭪𘲚𘱪)	Khitan	Imperial	AD 916–1125 (Note: Some historians consider AD 907, the year in which the Emperor Taizu of Liao was proclaimed "Khagan of the Khitans", to be the start of the Liao dynasty. Accordingly, the Liao dynasty lasted 218 years.)	209 years	Taizu of Liao	Tianzuo of Liao	(list) (tree)
Western Liao 西遼; Xī Liáo; Hsi^{1} Liao^{2} ㄒㄧ ㄌㄧㄠˊ	Yelü (Note: Kuchlug, originally without surname, was of Naiman descent. As he was not a member of the Yelü (耶律) clan by birth, his enthronement was not a typical dynastic succession.) 耶律 (𘬜𘭪𘲚𘱪)	Khitan	Royal (AD 1124–1132) Imperial (AD 1132–1218)	AD 1124–1218 (Note: Some historians consider AD 1132, the year in which the Emperor Dezong of Western Liao was proclaimed "Gurkhan", to be the start of the Western Liao. Accordingly, the Western Liao lasted 86 years.)	94 years	Dezong of Western Liao	Kuchlug	(list) (tree)
Northern Song (Note: The Northern Song (北宋) and the Southern Song (南宋) are collectively known as the Song dynasty (宋朝; Sòng Cháo; Sung^{4} Ch῾ao^{2}; ㄙㄨㄥˋ ㄔㄠˊ).) 北宋; Běi Sòng; Pei^{3} Sung^{4} ㄅㄟˇ ㄙㄨㄥˋ	Zhao 趙	Han	Imperial	AD 960–1127	167 years	Taizu of Song	Qinzong of Song	(list) (tree)
Southern Song 南宋; Nán Sòng; Nan^{2} Sung^{4} ㄋㄢˊ ㄙㄨㄥˋ	Zhao 趙	Han	Imperial	AD 1127–1279	152 years	Gaozong of Song	Zhao Bing	(list) (tree)
Western Xia 西夏; Xī Xià; Hsi^{1} Hsia^{4} ㄒㄧ ㄒㄧㄚˋ	Weiming (Note: The ruling house of the Western Xia initially bore the surname Tuoba (拓跋). The Tang dynasty and the Song dynasty later bestowed the surnames Li (李) and Zhao (趙) upon the family respectively. The Emperor Jingzong of Western Xia subsequently adopted Weiming (嵬名) as the surname in AD 1032 prior to the establishment of the Western Xia.) 嵬名 𗼨𗆟	Tangut	Imperial	AD 1038–1227	189 years	Jingzong of Western Xia	Li Xian	(list) (tree)
Jin dynasty 金朝; Jīn Cháo; Chin^{1} Ch῾ao^{2} ㄐㄧㄣ ㄔㄠˊ	Wanyan 完顏	Jurchen	Imperial	AD 1115–1234	119 years	Taizu of Jin	Wanyan Chenglin	(list) (tree)
Late Imperial China
Yuan dynasty 元朝; Yuán Cháo; Yüan^{2} Ch῾ao^{2} ㄩㄢˊ ㄔㄠˊ	Borjigin (Note: The ruling house of the Yuan dynasty initially bore the surname Kiyad (乞顏). Borjigin Munkhag and Kiyad-Borjigin Khabul respectively adopted Borjigin (孛兒只斤) and Kiyad-Borjigin (乞顏·孛兒只斤) as the surname prior to the establishment of the Yuan dynasty. The Emperor Liezu of Yuan subsequently restored Borjigin as the surname prior to the establishment of the Yuan dynasty.) 孛兒只斤 ᠪᠣᠷᠵᠢᠭᠢᠨ	Mongol	Imperial	AD 1271–1368 (Note: Some historians consider AD 1260, the year in which the Emperor Shizu of Yuan was proclaimed "Khagan of the Great Mongol State" and declared the era name "Zhongtong" (中統), to be the start of the Yuan dynasty. Accordingly, the Yuan dynasty lasted 108 years.)	97 years	Shizu of Yuan	Huizong of Yuan	(list) (tree)
Northern Yuan 北元; Běi Yuán; Pei^{3} Yüan^{2} ㄅㄟˇ ㄩㄢˊ	Borjigin (Note: The ruling house of the Northern Yuan initially bore the surname Kiyad (乞顏). Borjigin Munkhag and Kiyad-Borjigin Khabul respectively adopted Borjigin (孛兒只斤) and Kiyad-Borjigin (乞顏·孛兒只斤) as the surname prior to the establishment of the Northern Yuan. The Emperor Liezu of Yuan subsequently restored Borjigin as the surname prior to the establishment of the Northern Yuan.) (Note: Choros Esen, surnamed Choros (綽羅斯), was of Oirat descent. As he was not a member of the Borjigin (孛兒只斤) clan by birth, his enthronement was not a typical dynastic succession.) 孛兒只斤 ᠪᠣᠷᠵᠢᠭᠢᠨ	Mongol	Imperial	AD 1368–1635 (Note: Traditional Chinese historiography considers the Northern Yuan to have ended in either AD 1388 or AD 1402 when the dynastic name "Great Yuan" was abolished. Accordingly, the Northern Yuan lasted either 20 years or 34 years, and its last ruler was either the Tianyuan Emperor or the Örüg Temür Khan. However, some historians regard the Mongol-ruled regime that existed from AD 1388 or AD 1402 up to AD 1635—referred to in the History of Ming as "Dada" (韃靼)—as a direct continuation of the Northern Yuan.)	267 years	Huizong of Yuan	Borjigin Erke Khongghor	(list) (tree)
Ming dynasty 明朝; Míng Cháo; Ming^{2} Ch῾ao^{2} ㄇㄧㄥˊ ㄔㄠˊ	Zhu 朱	Han	Imperial	AD 1368–1644	276 years	Hongwu	Chongzhen	(list) (tree)
Southern Ming 南明; Nán Míng; Nan^{2} Ming^{2} ㄋㄢˊ ㄇㄧㄥˊ	Zhu 朱	Han	Imperial	AD 1644–1662 (Note: Some historians consider AD 1664, the year in which the reign of the Dingwu Emperor came to an end, to be the end of the Southern Ming. Accordingly, the Southern Ming lasted 20 years and its last ruler was the Dingwu Emperor. However, the existence and identity of the Dingwu Emperor, supposedly reigned from AD 1646 to AD 1664, are disputed.)	18 years	Hongguang	Yongli	(list) (tree)
Later Jin 後金; Hòu Jīn; Hou^{4} Chin^{1} ㄏㄡˋ ㄐㄧㄣ	Aisin Gioro 愛新覺羅 ᠠᡳᠰᡳᠨ ᡤᡳᠣᡵᠣ	Jurchen (Note: The Jurchen ethnic group was renamed "Manchu" in AD 1635 by the Emperor Taizong of Qing.)	Royal	AD 1616–1636	20 years	Tianming	Taizong of Qing	(list) (tree)
Qing dynasty 清朝; Qīng Cháo; Ch῾ing^{1} Ch῾ao^{2} ㄑㄧㄥ ㄔㄠˊ	Aisin Gioro 愛新覺羅 ᠠᡳᠰᡳᠨ ᡤᡳᠣᡵᠣ	Manchu	Imperial	AD 1636–1912 (Note: The Articles of Favorable Treatment of the Great Qing Emperor After His Abdication allowed the Xuantong Emperor to retain his imperial title and enjoy other privileges following his abdication, resulting in the existence of a titular court in the Forbidden City known as the "Remnant Court of the Abdicated Qing Imperial Family" (遜清皇室小朝廷) between AD 1912 and AD 1924. Following the Beijing Coup, Feng Yuxiang revoked the privileges and abolished the titular court in AD 1924.) (Note: The Qing dynasty was briefly restored between 1 July 1917 and 12 July 1917 when Zhang Xun reinstalled the Xuantong Emperor to the Chinese throne. Due to the abortive nature of the event, it is usually excluded from Qing history.)	276 years	Taizong of Qing	Xuantong	(list) (tree)

Legend
Dynasties of relatively great significance
Major time periods
Dynasties counted among the "Three Kingdoms"
Dynasties counted among the "Sixteen Kingdoms"
Dynasties counted among the "Northern dynasties" within the broader "Northern and Southern dynasties"
Dynasties counted among the "Southern dynasties" within the broader "Northern and Southern dynasties"
Dynasties counted among the "Five Dynasties" within the broader "Five Dynasties and Ten Kingdoms"
Dynasties counted among the "Ten Kingdoms" within the broader "Five Dynasties and Ten Kingdoms"
Criteria for inclusion
This list includes only the major dynasties of China that are typically found in simplified forms of Chinese historical timelines. Many other dynastic regimes existed within or overlapped with the geographical boundaries specified in the definition of "China" in the study of Chinese historical geography. (Note: As proposed by scholars such as Tan Qixiang, the geographical extent of "China" as defined in Chinese historical geography largely corresponds with the territories once ruled by the Qing dynasty during its territorial peak between the AD 1750s and the AD 1840s, prior to the outbreak of the First Opium War. At its height, the Qing dynasty exercised jurisdiction over an area larger than 13 million km^{2}, encompassing: Tannu Uriankhai in the north; Stanovoy Range and Sakhalin in the northeast; Taiwan and its adjacent islands in the southeast; Hainan and the South China Sea Islands in the south; Pamir Mountains in the west; Lake Balkhash in the northwest.; Modern Chinese historiography considers all regimes, regardless of the ethnicity of the ruling class, that were established within or overlapped with the above geographical boundaries to be part of Chinese history. Similarly, all ethnic groups that were active within the above geographical boundaries are considered ethnicities of China. Regions outside of the above geographical boundaries but were under Chinese rule during various historical periods are included in the histories of the respective Chinese dynasties.) These were:
- Dynastic regimes that existed within the fengjian system: e.g., State of Deng, State of Huo, State of Chu, State of Yiqu
- Dynastic regimes that existed within the jimi system: e.g., Xuanque Prefecture (玄闕州), Zhulong Prefecture (燭龍州), Maolian Guard (毛憐衛), Jianzhou Left Guard (建州左衛)
- Dynastic regimes that existed within the tusi system: e.g., Chiefdom of Bozhou, Chiefdom of Shuidong, Chiefdom of Yongning, Chiefdom of Tsanlha
- Localized dynastic regimes: e.g., Nanyue, Tuyuhun, Dali Kingdom, Kingdom of Tungning
- Short-lived dynastic regimes: e.g., Zhai Wei, Northern Liao, Chen Han, Shun dynasty
- Regional dynastic regimes that ruled an area historically or currently associated with "China": e.g., Rouran Khaganate, Tibetan Empire, Bohai, Kara-Khanid Khanate

Dynasties that belonged to the following categories are excluded from this list:

- Dynasties outside of "China" with full or partial Chinese ancestry: e.g., Early Lý dynasty of Vietnam, Thonburi dynasty of Siam
- Dynasties that ruled Chinese tributary states outside of "China": e.g., Đinh dynasty of Vietnam, First Shō dynasty of the Ryukyu Islands
- Dynasties outside of "China" which identified themselves as "China": e.g., Joseon dynasty of Korea, Nguyễn dynasty of Vietnam
- Dynasties that ruled Sinicized states outside of "China": e.g., Baekje dynasty of Korea, Later Lê dynasty of Vietnam

== Timelines ==
=== Timeline of major historical periods ===
Xia–Shang–W. Zhou
Spring and Autumn
Warring States
Qin–Han
Jin–Northern and Southern Dynasties
Sui–Tang
Five Dynasties–Liao–Song–W. Xia–Jin–Yuan
Ming–Qing
ROC–PRC

=== Timeline of major regimes ===
Legend
Protodynastic rulers
Dynastic regimes (Note: The dynastic regimes included in this timeline are the same as the list above.)
Non-dynastic regimes

== See also ==
- 1911 Revolution
- Administration of territory in dynastic China
- Ancient Chinese states
- Chinese expansionism
- Chinese historiography
- Chinese sovereign
- Conquest dynasty
- Debate on the Chineseness of Yuan and Qing dynasties
- Dragon Throne
- Dynastic cycle
- Eighteen Kingdoms
- Emperor at home, king abroad
- Emperor of China
- Family tree of Chinese monarchs (ancient)
- Family tree of Chinese monarchs (early)
- Family tree of Chinese monarchs (late)
- Family tree of Chinese monarchs (middle)
- Family tree of Chinese monarchs (Warring States period)
- Fanzhen
- Fengjian
- Golden ages of China
- Historical capitals of China
- Jiedushi
- Jimi system
- List of Chinese monarchs
- List of Confucian states and dynasties
- List of Mongol states
- List of recipients of tribute from China
- List of tributary states of China
- List of Vietnamese dynasties
- Little China (ideology)
- Mandate of Heaven
- Monarchy of China
- Names of China
- Pax Sinica
- Sinosphere
- Six Dynasties
- Succession to the Chinese throne
- Three Sovereigns and Five Emperors
- Tianxia
- Timeline of Chinese history
- Tributary system of China
- Tusi
- Twenty-Four Histories
- Xia–Shang–Zhou Chronology Project
- Zhonghua minzu
