= Chinese sovereign =

Ruler of a particular regime in ancient and imperial China

The Chinese sovereign was the ruler of a particular monarchical regime in the historical periods of ancient China and imperial China. Sovereigns ruling the same regime, and descended from the same paternal line, constituted a dynasty. Several titles and naming schemes have been used throughout Chinese history.

== Sovereign titles ==
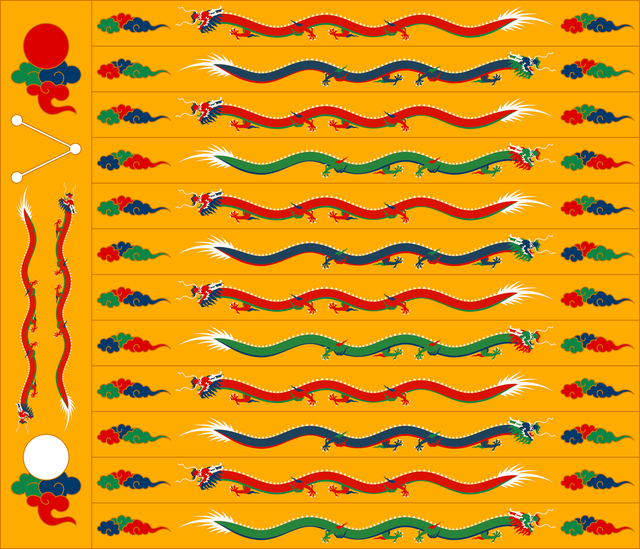
The Great Chang banner (大常/太常), also known as Banner of Celestial Bodies (辰旒), the highest ranking banner reserved for monarchs per Rites of Zhou.

=== Emperor ===
The characters Huang (皇 huáng "august (ruler)") and Di (帝 dì "divine ruler") had been used separately and never consecutively (see Three August Ones and Five Emperors). The character was reserved for mythological rulers until the first emperor of Qin (Qin Shi Huang), who created a new title Huangdi (皇帝, in pinyin: huáng dì) for himself in 221 BCE, which is commonly translated as Emperor in English. This title continued in use until the fall of the Qing dynasty in 1912.

From the Han dynasty, the title Huangdi could also be abbreviated to huang or di. The former nobility titles Qing (卿), Daifu (大夫) and Shi (仕) became synonyms for court officials.

The power of the emperor varied between emperors and dynasties, with some emperors being absolute rulers and others being figureheads with actual power lying in the hands of court factions, eunuchs, the bureaucracy or noble families. In principle, the title of emperor was transmitted from father to son via primogeniture, as endorsed by Confucianism. However, there are many exceptions to this rule. For example, because the Emperor usually had many concubines, the first born of the empress (i.e. the chief consort) is usually the heir apparent. However, Emperors could elevate another more favoured child or the child of a favourite concubine to the status of Crown Prince. Disputes over succession occurred regularly and led to a number of civil wars. In the Qing dynasty, primogeniture was abandoned altogether, with the designated heir kept secret until after the Emperor's death.

Of the San Huang Wu Di, the three first of them were called 皇 (huang, "august (ruler)") and the five last were called 帝 (di, "divine ruler"), which can translate as either emperor, demigod, divine ancestor, or superhuman. This title may have been used in the Shang and Xia dynasties, though oracle bones were found from the Shang dynasty showing the title 王 (wáng, "king").

=== King ===
The king (王, wáng) was the Chinese head of state during the Zhou dynasty. Its use during the Xia and Shang is uncertain but possible: the character has been found upon oracle bones. It was abolished under the Qin and, after that, the same term was used for (and translated as) royal princes. The title was commonly given to members of the Emperor's family and could be inherited. A poem from about 2,500 years ago said "普天之下,莫非王土.率土之賓,莫非王臣" which roughly translates as "Under the sky, nothing is not the king's land; the people who lead the lands, no one is not the king's subjects."

=== Son of Heaven ===
"Son of Heaven" was a title of the Emperor based on the Mandate of Heaven. The Son of Heaven is a universal emperor who rules tianxia comprising "all under heaven". The title was not interpreted literally. The monarch is a mortal chosen by Heaven, not its actual descendant. The title comes from the Mandate of Heaven, created by the monarchs of the Zhou dynasty to justify deposing the Shang dynasty. They declared that Heaven had revoked the mandate from the Shang and given it to the Zhou in retaliation for their corruption and misrule. Heaven bestowed the mandate to whoever was best fit to rule. The title held the emperor responsible for the prosperity and security of his people through the threat of losing the mandate.

Unlike with over sovereigns such as the Emperor of Japan, Chinese political theory allowed for dynastic change, based on the concept of the Mandate of Heaven. The theory behind this was that the Chinese emperor acted as the Son of Heaven. As the only legitimate ruler, his authority extended to "all under heaven" and had neighbors only in a geographical sense. He holds a mandate to which he had a valid claim to rule over (or to lead) everyone else in the world as long as he served the people well. If the ruler became immoral, then rebellion is justified and heaven would take away that mandate and give it to another. This single most important concept legitimized the dynastic cycle or the change of dynasties regardless of social or ethnic background. This principle made it possible for dynasties founded by families of non-noble origins such as the Han dynasty and the Ming dynasty or non-ethnic Han dynasties such as the Mongol-led Yuan dynasty and the Manchu-led Qing dynasty. It was moral integrity and benevolent leadership that determined the holder of the Mandate of Heaven. Every dynasty that self-consciously adopted this administrative practice powerfully reinforced this Sinocentric concept throughout the history of imperial China. Historians noted that this was one of the key reasons why imperial China in many ways had the most efficient system of government in ancient times.

It was generally not possible for a woman to succeed to the throne and in the history of China; there has only been one reigning Empress, Wu Zetian (624–705), who usurped the throne of the Tang dynasty by establishing her own Wu Zhou dynasty.

=== Hegemon ===
Xiang Yu styled himself Xīchǔ Bàwáng (西楚霸王, lit. Hegemon of Western Chu).

== Non-Han titles taken by Chinese rulers ==
Emperor Taizong of Tang was crowned Tian Kehan (天可汗), or "heavenly Khagan", after defeating the Göktürks (Tujue).

== Monarchical titles ==
Chinese monarchs possessed an elaborate set of monarchical titles, both when they were alive and after their death. Based on Chinese historiographical convention, monarchs of China are typically referred to by one of their many titles, although it is not incorrect per se to reference them using other titles that they held. Even though exceptions exist, Chinese rulers until the end of the Sui dynasty are mainly referred to by their posthumous names, monarchs from the Tang dynasty to the Yuan dynasty are generally known by their temple names, while rulers from the Ming dynasty onwards are typically known by their era names. As some of these titles were used repeatedly throughout history, historians often reference the name of the regime to avoid potential confusion. The same monarchical tradition was adopted throughout the Chinese cultural sphere.

General format in Mandarin Chinese:

Name of regime + regnal/temple/posthumous name
E.g. Běi Zhōu Xiàomǐn Dì (北周孝閔帝), "Běi Zhōu" being the Northern Zhou dynasty, while "Xiàomǐn Dì" was the posthumous name of Yuwen Jue
Era name + monarchical rank
E.g. Chénghuà Dì (成化帝), "Chénghuà" being the era name of Zhu Jianshen, while "Dì" refers to his rank as an emperor

=== Regnal name ===
Regnal names (尊號; zūn hào) were monarchical titles adopted during the reign of monarchs or after their abdication. Due to naming taboo, regnal names were the most straightforward method Chinese rulers could be referred to during their regimes.

Examples of regnal names
Personal name (Surname + given name)	Regnal name	Dynasty
Ying Zheng 嬴政	Shi Huangdi 始皇帝	Qin
Wu Zhao 武曌	Empress Cishi Yuegu Jinlun Shengshen 慈氏越古金輪聖神皇帝	Wu Zhou
Liu Jiyuan 劉繼元	Emperor Yingwu 英武皇帝	Northern Han
Zhao Heng 劉繼元	Emperor Yingtian Zundao Qinming Renxiao 應天尊道欽明仁孝皇帝	Northern Song
Yelü Dashi 耶律大石	Emperor Tianyou 天祐皇帝	Western Liao
Borjigin Kublai 孛兒只斤·忽必烈	Emperor Xiantian Shudao Renwen Yiwu Daguang Xiao 憲天述道仁文義武大光孝皇帝	Yuan

=== Era name ===
Era names (年號; nián hào) were proclaimed by Chinese sovereigns for the purpose of identifying and numbering years since 140 BC, during the reign of the Emperor Wu of Han. Strictly speaking, era names were not personal titles of Chinese monarchs per se. However, as most rulers of the Ming and Qing dynasties adopted only one era name throughout the entirety of their reigns, era names have come to be closely associated with Ming and Qing monarchs, to the extent that they are frequently referenced using their respective era names by historians.

Although a specific era name could be used by one monarch only, there were also many instances in which an era name was used by multiple monarchs, or a monarch could proclaim numerous era names throughout his/her reign. For this reason, it would be tedious for Chinese monarchs before the Ming dynasty to be referred to by their era names.

Examples of era names
Personal name (Surname + given name)	Era name(s)	Dynasty
Cao Pi 曹丕	Huangchu 黃初	Cao Wei
Fu Jian 苻堅	Yongxing 永興 Ganlu 甘露 Jianyuan 建元	Former Qin
Xiao Fangzhi 蕭方智	Shaotai 紹泰 Taiping 太平	Liang
Liu Yan 劉龑	Qianheng 乾亨 Bailong 白龍 Dayou 大有	Southern Han
Li Liangzuo 李諒祚	Yansiningguo 延嗣寧國 Tianyouchuisheng 天祐垂聖 Fushengchengdao 福聖承道 Duodu 奲都 Gonghua 拱化	Western Xia
Zhu Zhanji 朱瞻基	Xuande 宣德	Ming

=== Temple name ===
Temple names (廟號; miào hào) were accorded to Chinese monarchs after their death, for the purpose of ancestor worship. Temple names consisted of two or three Chinese characters, with the last word being either zǔ (祖; "progenitor") or zōng (宗; "ancestor").

Examples of temple names
Personal name (Surname + given name)	Temple name	Dynasty
Yuan Ziyou 元子攸	Jingzong 敬宗	Northern Wei
Yang Jian 楊堅	Gaozu 高祖	Sui
Li Dan 李旦	Ruizong 睿宗	Tang
Wang Jipeng 王繼鵬	Kangzong 康宗	Min
Wanyan Sheng 完顏晟	Taizong 太宗	Jin
Aisin Gioro Xuanye 愛新覺羅·玄燁	Shengzu 聖祖	Qing

=== Posthumous name ===
Posthumous names (謚號; shì hào) were accorded to Chinese monarchs after their death. These were adjectives originally intended to determine the achievements and moral values, or the lack thereof, of one's life.

Examples of posthumous names
Personal name (Surname + given name)	Posthumous name	Dynasty
Ji Yun 姬允	Duke Huan 桓公	Lu
Mi Wan 芈完	King Kaolie 考烈王	Chu
Liu Zhao 劉肇	Emperor Xiaohe 孝和皇帝	Eastern Han
Qifu Qiangui 乞伏乾歸	Prince Wuyuan 武元王	Western Qin
Zhu Yujian 朱聿鍵	Emperor Peitian Zhidao Hongyi Sumu Siwen Liewu Minren Guangxiao Xiang 配天至道弘毅肅穆思文烈武敏仁廣孝襄皇帝	Southern Ming
Aisin Gioro Zaitian 愛新覺羅·載湉	Emperor Tongtian Chongyun Dazhong Zhizheng Jingwen Weiwu Renxiao Ruizhi Duanjian Kuanqin Jing 同天崇運大中至正經文緯武仁孝睿智端儉寬勤景皇帝	Qing

=== Historiographical denomination ===
Historians sometimes refer to certain Chinese rulers using generic terms, mostly due to their lack of regnal name, temple name or posthumous name. These terms describe the circumstances of the monarchs and are not officially accorded by the regimes themselves. The monarchical rank held by the rulers is affixed to the back of these adjectives to form the full historiographical denominations. For example, "Fèidì" (廢帝) is formed from the amalgamation of "fèi" (廢; "deposed") and the abbreviated form of "huángdì" (皇帝; "emperor"), thus is used to refer to monarchs who were overthrown.

Examples of historiographical denominations
Historiographical term	Meaning
Shào 少	"Young"
Yòu 幼	"Young"
Fèi 廢	"Deposed"
Xùn 遜	"Abdicated"
Mò 末	"Final"

== See also ==
- Emperor of China (Era names, Temple name, Posthumous name)
- List of Chinese monarchs
- Chinese emperors family tree
  - Ancient – Warring States – Early – Middle – Late
- Chinese historiography
- History of China (dynasties) & (timeline)
- Chinese nobility
- List of recipients of tribute from China
- Succession to the Chinese throne
- List of tributaries of Imperial China
- Mandate of Heaven
- Taiping Rebellion
- Monarchy of China
- Heavenly King
- Gurkhan
