= Succession to the Chinese throne =

Succession in Imperial China

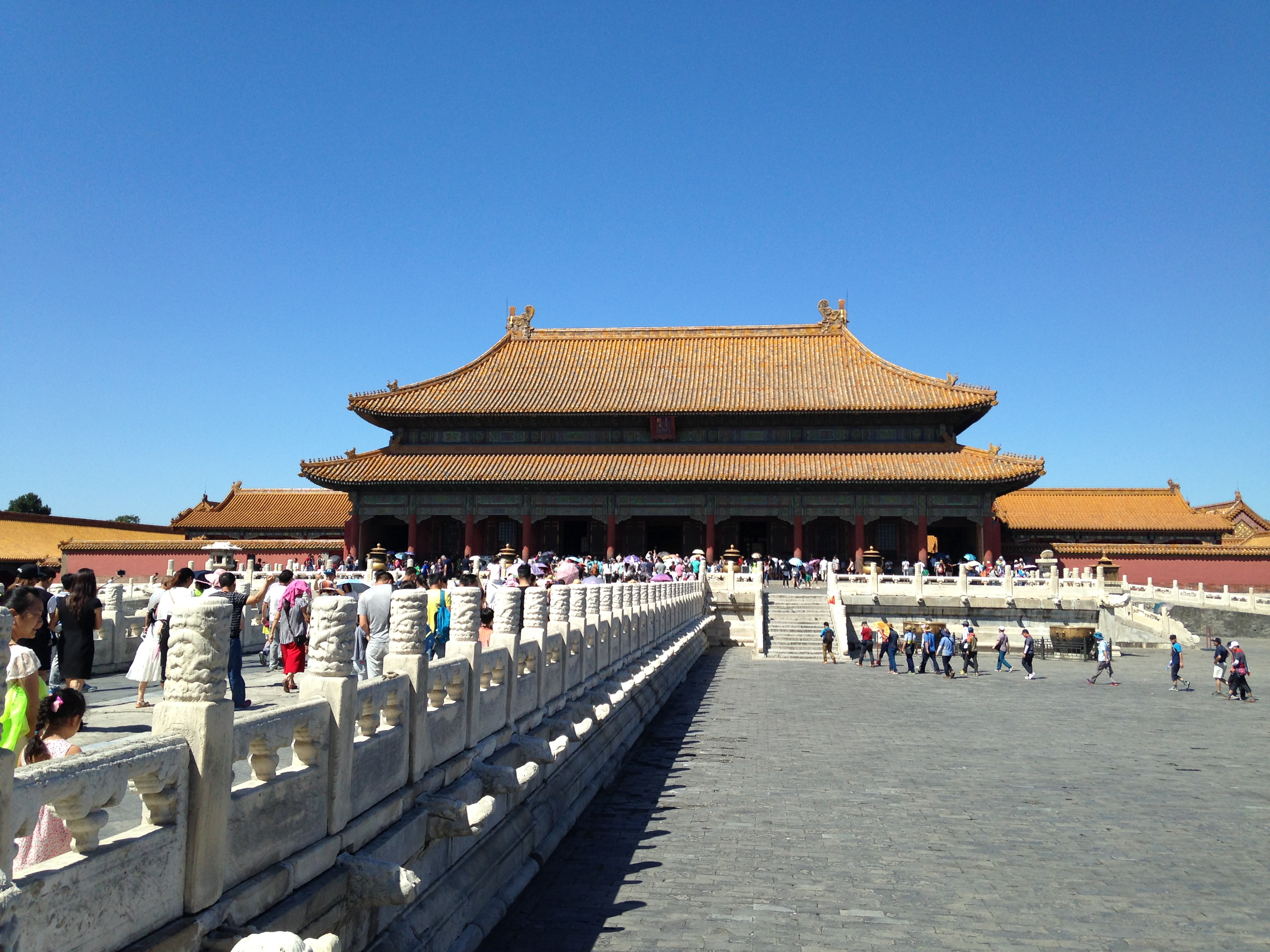
The Qing emperors hid their edicts on succession in a box in the Palace of Heavenly Purity in Beijing. This practice was first used by the Yongzheng emperor.

The Chinese monarchy had various methods to determine succession to the Chinese throne before the institution was overthrown in 1911. The Mongol-led Yuan dynasty practiced blood tanistry, or competition among brothers, while the Ming dynasty favored primogeniture, with an emperor succeeded by his eldest son. During the Manchu-led Qing dynasty, an emperor would write an edict to select one of his sons in secret. An emperor could have numerous sons by women of various ranks, so the heir might not be obvious until it was announced.

In general, Chinese succession can be classified as postmortem and father-to-son. The emperor selected a successor from among his sons. There was a strong preference for the eldest son of the empress. If the emperor did not have a son, he could adopt, usually from a relative of the same clan. The realm was never divided among heirs. Sisters and daughters were not factors in the succession process. Empress dowagers often served as king makers, and sometimes ruled in their own right without claiming monarchical title. Abdication was possible, but rare.

== Tang dynasty ==
In the Tang dynasty, succession theoretically went to the eldest son of the empress, a system called dizhangzi jicheng. (Note: dizhangzi jicheng (嫡長子繼承).) During the first half of the dynasty, internal power struggles meant that in practice succession more closely resembled blood tanistry, i.e. the most capable of all potential heirs succeeding to the throne. Every single succession during this period involved strife and bloodshed. Fratricide was commonplace; filicide and patricide both occurred as well. It was not until Emperor Suzong was succeeded by Emperor Daizong in 762 that the eldest son succeeded his father for the first time.

== Ming dynasty ==
The difficulties that the Hongwu Emperor, the founder of the Ming dynasty, had in designating an heir set a benchmark for the dynasty that followed. Even before coming to the throne, the Hongwu Emperor designated his eldest son Zhu Biao as heir. When Zhu Biao died in 1392, many expected the Hongwu Emperor to appoint Zhu Di, his talented and ambitious fourth son, as heir. The emperor finally named Zhu Biao's eldest son Zhu Yunwen as heir, thus establishing the principle of primogeniture. In 1402, Zhu Di seized power as the Yongle Emperor.

== Qing dynasty ==
=== Kangxi Emperor ===
The Kangxi Emperor designated Yunreng, his second son, as crown prince. This was resented by the Kangxi Emperor's other 34 sons. Yunreng's delicate mental state deteriorated under the stress of learning that many of his brothers were plotting against him. He was twice deposed as crown prince. When the Kangxi Emperor died, Yinzhen, the emperor's fourth son, gathered military support in Beijing and arranged for a reading of an edict that named him as successor. Some historians have accused Yinzhen of forging this edict. As the Yongzheng Emperor, Yinzhen created a system that allowed an emperor to designate an heir in secret. Under this system, the emperor would write an edict designating a successor. The edict would be sealed in a box behind a tablet in the Palace of Heavenly Purity in the Forbidden City. The first Qing emperor who acceded to the throne through this method was the Qianlong Emperor in 1735.

=== Xinhai Revolution ===
During the Xinhai Revolution, some proposed that the Manchu-led Qing dynasty should be replaced by a new dynasty of ethnic Han origin. Both Duke Yansheng, a descendant of Confucius, and the Marquis of Extended Grace, a descendant of the imperial family of the Ming dynasty, were proposed and rejected.

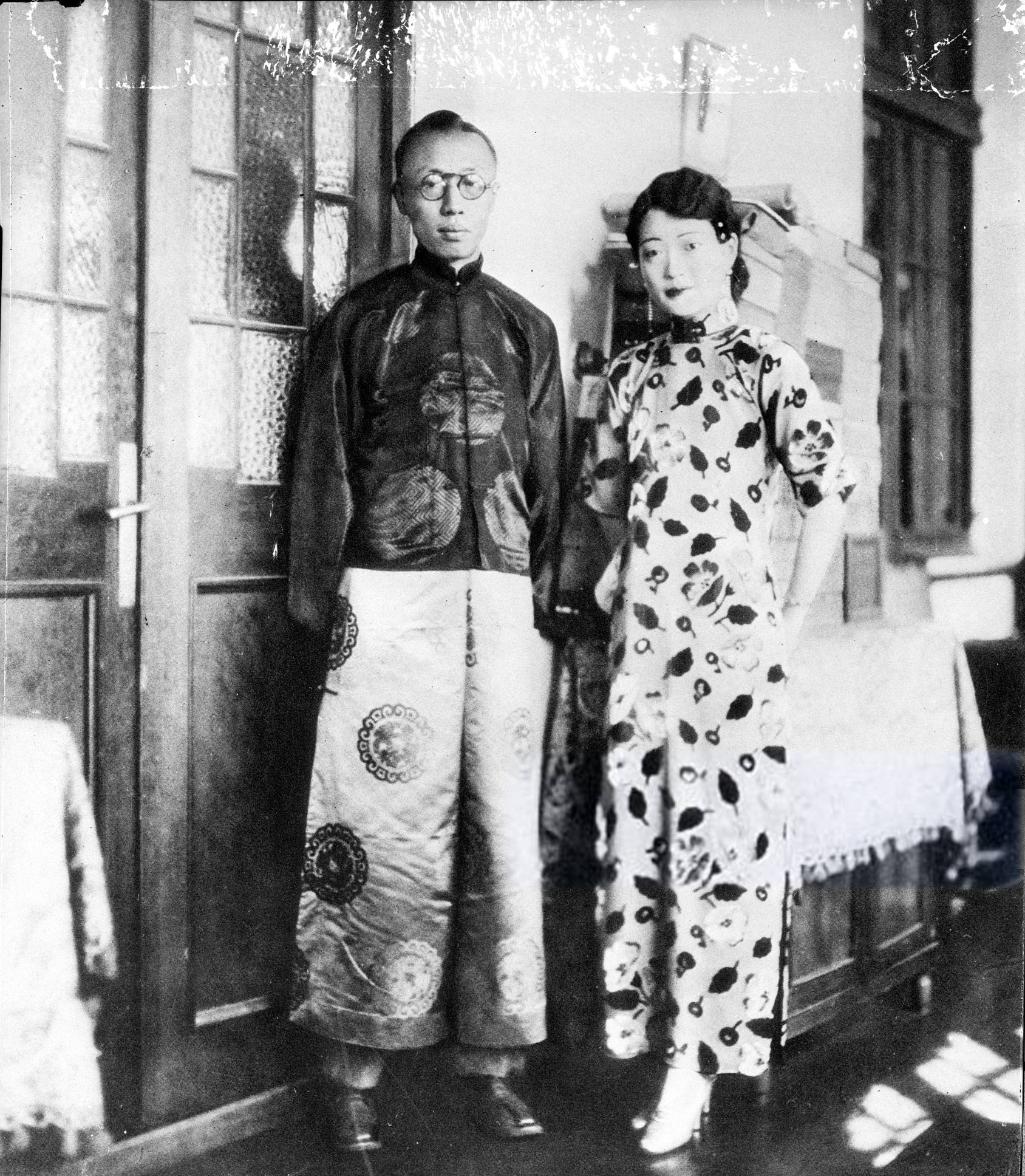
Emperor Puyi and consort Wanrong, 1928–1930.

In 1912, the Qing dynasty was overthrown and China was declared a republic. However, Puyi continued to reign in the Forbidden City until 1924, when the Articles of Favorable Treatment were revoked.

== See also ==
- Monarchy of China
- Chinese sovereign
- List of Chinese monarchs
- Marquis of Extended Grace, descendants of the Ming dynasty
- Duke Yansheng, descendants of the Shang dynasty and Confucius
