= Marquis of Extended Grace =

Qing dynasty noble title for Ming dynasty descendant

Marquis of Zhu 延恩侯
- Creation date: 1725
- Created by: Qing dynasty Empire of China; Republic of China
- Peerage: Chinese nobility
- First holder: Zhu Zhilian
- Last holder: Zhu Yuxun
- Extinction date: 1929 (Title abolished)

Marquis of Extended Grace
- Chinese: 延恩侯
Transcriptions
Standard Mandarin
- Hanyu Pinyin: Yán'ēn Hóu
- Wade–Giles: Yen-en Hou
Yue: Cantonese
- Yale Romanization: Yìhnyān Hàuh
- Jyutping: jin4 jan1 hau4

The Marquis of Extended Grace was a title held by a descendant of the imperial family of the Ming dynasty (1368–1644) during the subsequent Qing dynasty (1644–1912). Holders of this title were also called the Marquis of Zhu from the surname of the Ming imperial family. The marquis presided at memorial ceremonies held twice a year at the Ming tombs near Beijing.

The Ming dynasty was Han Chinese while the Qing dynasty was dominated by the Manchus, a people from the northeast. Many people remained loyal to the Ming dynasty long after it collapsed. From 1644 to 1662, there were several loyalist armies based in southern China.

Several Ming princes accompanied Koxinga to Taiwan in 1662, including Zhu Shugui and Zhu Honghuan, son of Zhu Yihai, where they lived in the Kingdom of Tungning. Koxinga's grandson Zheng Keshuang surrendered to the Qing dynasty in 1683 and was rewarded by the Kangxi Emperor with the title "Duke of Hanjun" (漢軍公). The Qing then sent the 17 Ming princes still living on Taiwan back to mainland China where they spent the rest of their lives in exile, since their lives were spared and they were not executed. Zhu Honghuan was among them.

The Qing government finally made peace with the Ming loyalists in 1725 when the Yongzheng Emperor bestowed the title of marquis on Zhu Zhilian (Chu Chih lien), a senior descendant of the Ming imperial family. He was posthumously promoted to Marquis of Extended Grace in 1750. The title suggests that the Qing emperors were extending their grace to a representative of a defunct dynasty. Zhu Zhilian was also inducted into the Han Chinese Plain White Banner of the Eight Banners, which was one of the Three Upper Banners.

It was a Chinese custom for the emperors of a new dynasty to enfeoff a member of the previous dynasty they overthrew with a noble title and give them land or a stipend to offer sacrifices at their ancestor's graves, practiced since the Shang dynasty when the Zhou dynasty granted the fief of Song to a descendant of the Shang royal family. This practice was referred to as èrwáng-sānkè (二王三恪) or "the two crownings and the three respects". Regardless, the marquis was not granted the privilege to practice Ming customs and rituals. In contrast to the practices of previous dynasties, the marquis served the Qing monarchy as subjects, instead of honoured guests with independent fiefdoms. Moreover, the marquis' branch is one of minority in the House of Zhu. It can thus be argued that the Qing monarchs discontinued such custom with the installation of "Marquis of the Extended Grace".

During the Xinhai Revolution which led to the abdication of the Qing emperor, some advocated that a Han Chinese be installed as emperor, either the descendant of Confucius, who was the Duke Yansheng, or the Ming imperial family descendant, the Marquis of Extended Grace.

The last marquis was Zhu Yuxun. In September 1924, Zhu met Reginald Johnston, the British tutor of Puyi, the last Qing emperor. Although China had been a republic since 1912, Puyi was still holding his imperial court in the Forbidden City at this time. Even though Zhu was living in a hovel and had only rags to wear, Johnston described him as "still a true Chinese gentleman." The business card Zhu gave Johnston said he was a descendant of the Ming imperial family and lived in Yangguan Alley, a hutong near Dongzhimen. After Puyi was evicted from the Forbidden City in the Beijing Coup in October, Zhu visited him at the Japanese concession in Tianjin.

In 1929, Zhu Yuxun petitioned the National Government of the Republic of China for help since he was living in destitution and said he could no longer carry out his duties. The government abolished his title as marquis and paid him a stipend instead. In 1933, the government totally terminated all of his duties in carrying out ceremonies at the Ming tombs and totally ended his position. After that, nothing is known about what happened to Zhu Yuxun.

== List of titleholders ==
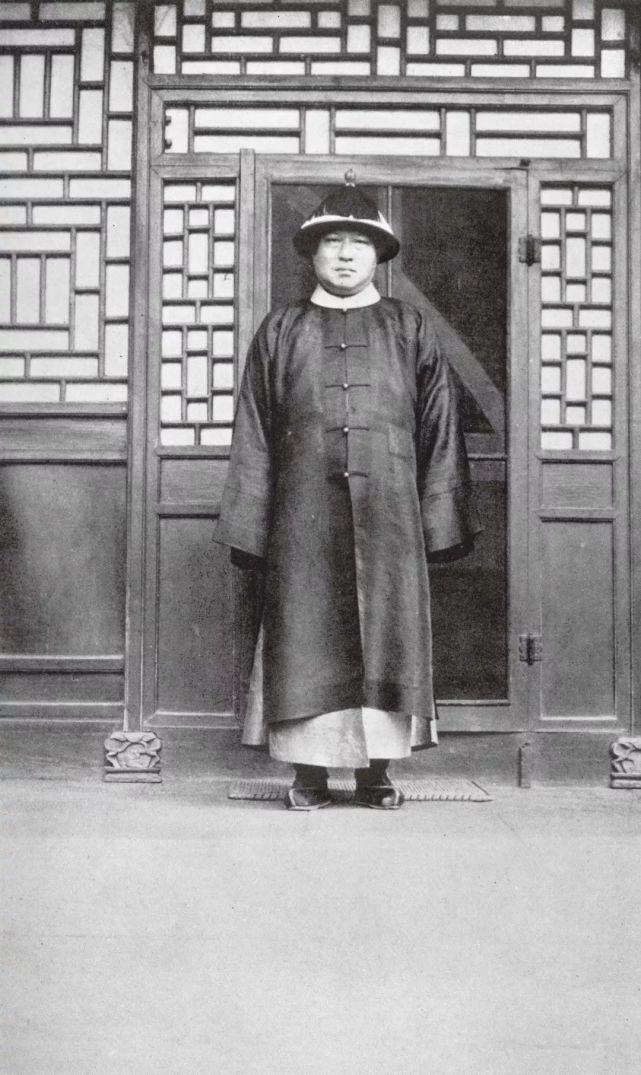
Zhu Yuxun (b. 1882), the last Marquis of Extended Grace

The following is a list of title holders: Adoptions occurred between related family members.

1. Zhu Zhilian (朱之琏; died 1730). Based on Zhilian's imperial ancestry, the Yongzheng Emperor awarded him the title of marquis in 1725. In 1750, he was posthumously awarded the title Marquis of Extended Grace by the Qianlong Emperor. A descendant of the first Ming emperor Zhu Yuanzhang's 13th son, Zhu Gui, Prince Jian of Dai (代簡王 朱桂), through Zhu Gui's descendant, Zhu Yiting (朱彝梃), who along with his agnatic nephew (brother's son) Zhu Wenyuan (朱文元) went on an expedition against the Qing in Liaodong during the Chongzhen Emperor's reign, since they were defeated in battle, they surrendered and defected to the Qing and were placed into the Bordered White Banner of the Eight Banners. Their descendant Zhu Zhilian was the prefectural magistrate of Zhengding County as appointed by the Yongzheng Emperor
2. Zhu Zhen (朱震), son of Zhilian
3. Zhu Shaomei (朱绍美), son of Zhen
4. Zhu Yifeng (朱仪凤), nephew of Shaomei, inherited title in 1777
5. Zhu Yurui (朱毓瑞), son of Yifeng, inherited title in 1797
6. Zhu Xiuji (朱秀吉), son of Yurui
7. Zhu Xiuxiang (朱秀祥), brother of Xiuji, inherited title in 1828
8. Zhu Yitan (朱贻坦), nephew of Xiuxiang, inherited title in 1836
9. Zhu Shugui (朱书桂), granduncle of Xiuxiang, inherited title in 1836
10. Zhu Heling (朱鹤龄), adopted son of Shugui
11. Zhu Chengrui (朱诚端), grandnephew of Heling, inherited title in 1869
12. Zhu Yuxun (朱煜勋; born 1882), son of Chengrui, inherited title in 1891

== See also ==
- Chinese nobility
- Song (state) - Descendants of the Shang dynasty kings granted a ducal title by the Zhou dynasty
- Duke Yansheng - Descendants of Confucius
- Jin Yuzhang – Current head of the House of Aisin-Gioro, the ruling house of the Qing dynasty.
