= List of recipients of tribute from China =

Central Plain political entities have paid tribute to a number of states and confederations throughout history. China proper also had a strong Confucian tradition, which believed that showing virtue and giving gifts or tribute would civilize "Barbarians". Many of them involved silk and tea, and during the Ming dynasty, China's input of silver increased due to trade with Spanish merchants in Manila, so they could pay tribute with silver.

- Xiongnu in 200 BCE-138 BCE: the Xiongnu repelled the invading army of the Western Han dynasty, advanced into the territory of China, and besieged its capital. The Chinese Emperor recognized the Great Wall as the border of the two states and was obliged to pay annual tribute (silk, liquor, rice) to the Xiongnu.
- First Turkic Khaganate: The Qi and Zhou dynasties of North China surrendered to the Turks in 570 and began paying tribute. Note that the Qi and Zhou dynasties were only small parts of China proper which had fragmented into several states. The Qi and Zhou dynasties had a hybrid Sino-Turkic leadership.
- Second Turkic Khaganate: Between 693 and 706, Qapaghan Qaghan's army crossed the Yellow River six times, which the Chinese forces could not offer any resistance. Empress Wu Zetian paid vast indemnities and sent Qapaghan gifts, which were in fact disguised tributes.
- Uighur Kaganate: Successful campaigns of the Uighur Kaganate led to a peace with the Tang dynasty which paid tribute in silk and grain for 12 years from 766.
- Khitan: From 936, Shi Jingtang of Later Jin described as a puppet of the emerging Liao dynasty. After Khitan's victory over the Song dynasty in 1005, they signed an invasion "Chanyuan Treaty"; requiring the Song to pay annual tribute to the Liao.
- Jurchen: In 1142, after a disastrous defeat, the Song dynasty agreed to be a vassal state of Jin dynasty and pay annual tribute.
- Altan Khan of Tumed Mongols in 1550s after Altan Khan besieged Beijing.
- Ligden Khan of Northern Yuan Chahar Mongols early 17th century: after a series of raids on China proper, the Ming dynasty court paid silver to Ligden Khan.

== See also ==
- List of tributary states of China
- Tributary system of China
