= Gordon Chang =

Gordon Chang may refer to:

- Gordon G. Chang (born 1951), American lawyer, commentator, and author of the 2001 book The Coming Collapse of China.
- Gordon H. Chang (born 1948), American historian and professor at Stanford University.

== See also ==
- Gordon Chan
