= Views of Xi Jinping =

Xi Jinping, a Chinese politician who has served as the general secretary of the Chinese Communist Party since 2012, has espoused views on numerous issues. Xi identifies as a Marxist and has declared socialism with Chinese characteristics to be the "only correct path to realize national rejuvenation."

== Politics ==
A party and its authority rests on winning the hearts and minds of the people. What the public opposes and hates, we must address and resolve.

[M]aterial and cultural needs grown; demands for democracy, rule of law, fairness and justice, security, and a better environment are also increasing each day.

— Xi Jinping during a speech in 2017

=== Chinese Dream ===
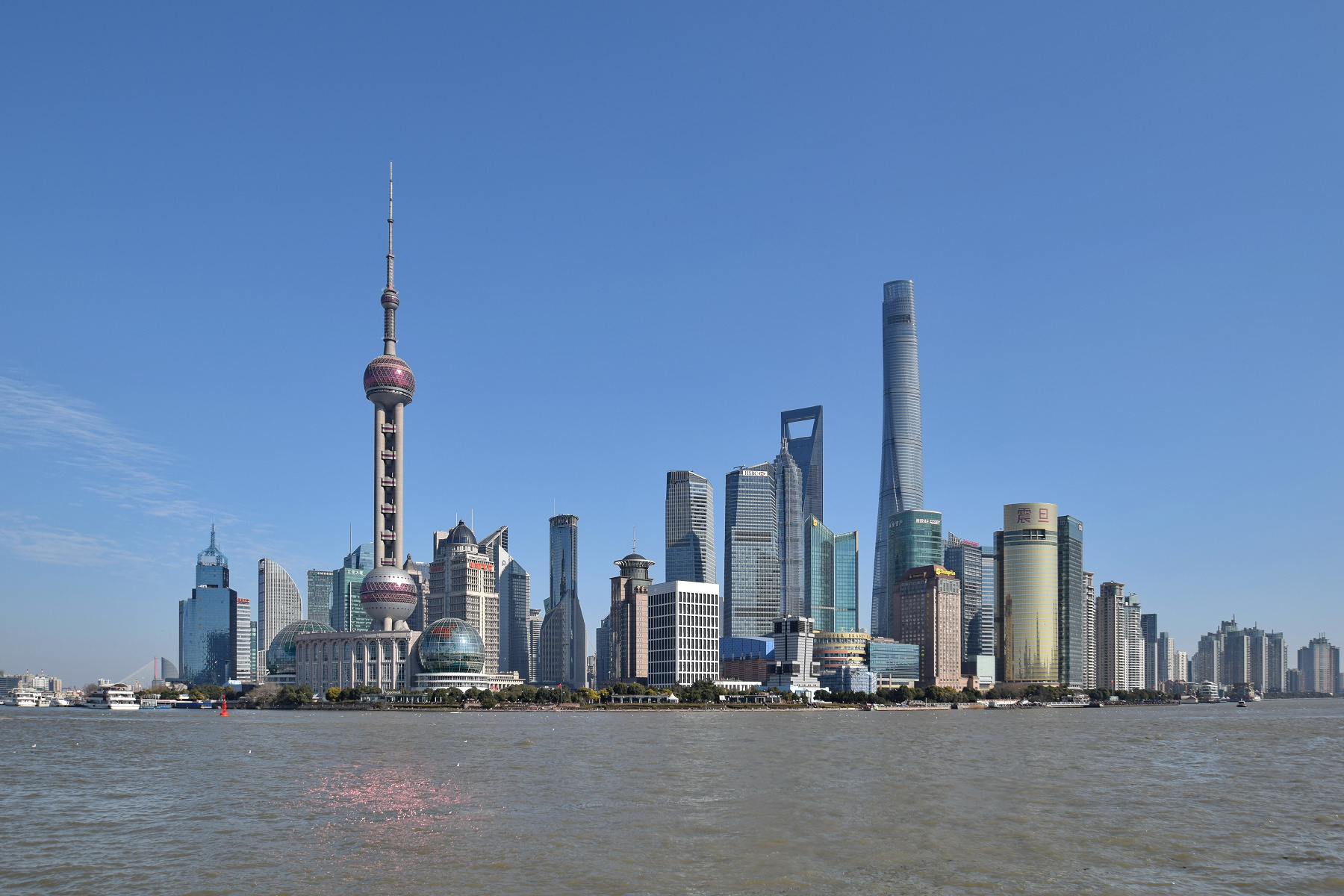
According to Qiushi, the Chinese Dream is about Chinese prosperity, collective effort, socialism, and national glory.

Xi and CCP ideologues coined the phrase "Chinese Dream" to describe his overarching plans for China as its leader. Xi first used the phrase during a high-profile visit to the National Museum of China on 29 November 2012, where he and his Politburo Standing Committee colleagues were attending a "national revival" exhibition. Since then, the phrase has become the signature political slogan of the Xi era. The origin of the term "Chinese Dream" is unclear. While the phrase has been used before by journalists and scholars, some publications have posited the term likely drew its inspiration from the concept of the American Dream. The Economist noted the abstract and seemingly accessible nature of the concept with no specific overarching policy stipulations may be a deliberate departure from the jargon-heavy ideologies of his predecessors. Xi has linked the "Chinese Dream" with the phrase "great rejuvenation of the Chinese nation".

=== Ideology ===
Xi has said that "only socialism can save China." Xi has also declared socialism with Chinese characteristics to be the "only correct path to realize national rejuvenation." According to BBC News, while the CCP was perceived to have abandoned its communist ideology since it initiated economic reforms in the 1970s, Xi is believed by some observers to be more believing in the "idea of a communist project", and was described as a Marxist–Leninist by former Australian prime minister Kevin Rudd. In June 2013, he said:

In our team of cadres, some are skeptical about communism, considering it an illusory and hard-to-reach fantasy. Some don't believe in Marx and Lenin but in ghosts and gods. They seek spiritual sustenance from feudal superstitions and are obsessed with fortune telling. They worship Buddha and seek "god's advice'' if in trouble. Some have faint concepts of right and wrong. They lack strong principles. Their morality degenerates. They perform their official duties mindlessly and muddle through their lives. Some even yearn for Western social [i.e., political] institutions and values, losing confidence in the future of socialism. Some maintain an ambivalent attitude toward political provocations against matters of principle such as the leadership of the Party and the path of socialism with Chinese characteristics. They shy away passively, not daring to unsheathe their sword, blur their position deliberately, respond connivingly and the like. Isn't it utterly absurd that leading party cadres and especially senior cadres display no attitude toward major principles, and in the face of political incidents and sensitive issues, take up no position and are indifferent?

Xi's emphasis on prioritizing ideology has included re-asserting the Party's goal of eventually realizing communism and reprimanding those who dismiss communism as impractical or irrelevant. Xi described the communist ideal as the "calcium" in a Party member's spine, without which the Party member would suffer the "osteoporosis" of political decay and be unable to stand upright. In 2014, Xi said:

Belief in Marxism and a faith in socialism and communism is the political soul and spiritual pillar of a Communist, enabling them to withstand all test. To put it more vividly, ideals and convictions are the spiritual calcium of Communists, and if these ideals and convictions are missing or irresolute, then there is a lack of spiritual calcium that leads to soft bone disease. This has proved true by the cases of some Party members and officials who acted improperly due to lack of ideals and confused faith.

Xi has spoken out against "historical nihilism", meaning historical viewpoints that challenge the official line of the CCP. Xi said that one of the reasons for the collapse of the Soviet Union has been historical nihilism. Xi showed great interest in why the Soviet Union dissolved, and how to avoid that failure in China:

Why did the Soviet Union disintegrate? Why did the Communist Party of the Soviet Union fall from power? An important reason was that the struggle in the field of ideology was extremely intense, completely negating the history of the Soviet Union, negating the history of the Communist Party of the Soviet Union, negating Lenin, negating Stalin, creating historical nihilism and confused thinking. Party organs at all levels had lost their functions, the military was no longer under Party leadership. In the end, the Communist Party of the Soviet Union, a great party, was scattered, the Soviet Union, a great socialist country, disintegrated. This is a cautionary tale!

Xi also blamed the dissolution of the Soviet Union on governance, stating the Communist Party of the Soviet Union had "separated itself from the people and became a privileged bureaucratic group that only protected its own interests".

He also said the road to communism would involve twists and turns:

Marx said, "no social norm will disappear before all its potential productive capacity have been brought into play; just like a new and more advanced production relation definitely will not appear until the material conditions of its existence in the old society have matured:' This important argument he made can help us understand why capitalism has yet to be completely vanquished; why socialism experienced the twists and turns of the disintegration of the Soviet Union and the turmoil of Eastern Europe; why Marxism foresaw a long historical path to reach communism. Once people fully grasp this and the methodology and scientific outlook for learning social evolution, we will be able to fix the centerpiece of our ideal, entrench the anchor-stone of our belief, and sustain strategic stability and resilience. We must reaffirm our confidence in the socialist road, the socialist theory, and the socialist system, and continuously raise the level of productivity in society and the living conditions of the people. Doing so will enable our socialist system to get rich and reveal its superiority, and broaden the pathway for our socialist road.

In support of his view that it is important to "enhance Party cadres' and members' belief in Marxism and communism, their belief in socialism with Chinese characteristics, and their confidence in the great rejuvenation of the Chinese nation," Xi established the Museum of the Communist Party of China, which opened in June 2021. Xi has called for the further Sinicization of Marxism, referring to adapting Marxism to the Chinese context. In July 2021, he formulated the Two Integrations, calling for integrating Marxism with China's specific conditions and China's traditional culture. Xi has called on CCP members to "remain true to our original aspiration", meaning to work for the happiness and well-being of the Chinese people and the rejuvenation of China, and launched an educational campaign for that goal from 2019 to 2020. Xi has rejected Westernization as the only way to modernize, instead promoting what he says is Chinese modernization. He has identified five concepts as part of Chinese-style modernization, including modernization of a huge population, common prosperity, material and cultural-ethical advancement, harmony between humanity and nature, and peaceful development. He has rejected adopting the Western political model:

Since the end of the Cold War, some countries afflicted by Western values have been in turmoil: some have been torn to pieces, some have been plunged into wars, others are in a constant state of disarray. If we tailor our practices to the Western capitalist value system or measure China's development against the Western capitalist evaluation system-in other words, upholding the Western standard as the sole standard, and repudiating deviations from it as backward and obsolete-I dread to contemplate the consequences! We will either trail behind slavishly or subject to abuse.

=== The leading role of the CCP ===
Xi Jinping delivering a speech on 30 June 2021 at the 100th anniversary of the CCP's founding

Xi has supported maintaining and further strengthening CCP's comprehensive leadership over all sectors of society, saying "government, the military, society and schools, north, south, east and west – the party leads them all." During the 100th anniversary of the CCP in 2021, he said that "without the Communist Party of China, there would be no new China and no national rejuvenation," and that "the leadership of the Party is the defining feature of socialism with Chinese characteristics and constitutes the greatest strength of this system." Xi stated:

Any malicious attempt to separate the Chinese Communist Party from the Chinese people or to pit them against each other will never succeed! The Chinese communists of over 95 million will not agree! The Chinese population of over 1.4 billion will also not agree!

Regarding modern history, Xi emphasizes focusing on "understand why the Chinese Communist Party can, why Marxism works, and why socialism is good". He considers the CCP to be the "only logical option" for China that was "chosen by history and the people". Xi has said that China, despite many setbacks, has achieved great progress under the CCP, saying that "Today there are about 130 socialist or communist parties active in 100 countries. Many developing countries look at China with envy and want to learn about our governance experience. Socialism with Chinese characteristics has become the standard-bearer of 21st-century socialist development." He said:

China's success proves that socialism is not dead. It is thriving. Just imagine this: had socialism failed in China, had our communist party collapsed like the party in the Soviet Union, then global socialism would lapse into a long Dark Age. And communism, like Karl Marx once said, would be a haunting spectre lingering in limbo.

However, he has also warned that it will take a long time for China under the CCP to complete its rejuvenation, and during this timeframe, party members must be vigilant to not let CCP rule collapse: "During this long period, how can we ensure that the Communist Party will not collapse and our political system will maintain its vigour? [It] is going to be a huge challenge and risk". In another speech in 2022, Xi said that the way to escape China's historical cycles of dynastic rise and falls and prevent "the Party from collapsing when its leaders die" is to engage in self-revolution, which he defines as to "strengthen the Party's foundation, detoxify and sterilize, make tough decisions, eliminate corruption and promote tissue regeneration, constantly eliminate the viruses that erode the Party's healthy body, constantly improve its own immunity".

In another speech, Xi has said that "our party is so large, and our country, so huge–it is such that if the Party Central lacks the sole authority to make decisions, nothing can be achieved", comparing the Party Central to the CCP's "cerebrum" and the "central nervous system", and said it "should have the sole authority in making decisions". However, he has also criticized officials that do not work without central directives, stating "if I do not write comments on reports, no work gets done." Regarding the central role of the party, Xi said in 2014:

Our Party, as a Marxist political party, attaches primacy to politics, which is our quintessential feature and advantage. Without powerful political assurance, party unity is an empty statement. There was a period in our country that put politics in command and "took class struggle as the key link." That was wrong. However, we also should not say let's not talk or talk less about politics. If a communist party does not attach primacy to politics, is it still a communist party? "If discipline and principles are discarded, is there anything that will not transpire?" I must be very clear here: the string of political discipline and protocols must never be loose. Corruption problems are corruption problems. Political problems are political problems. We should attach primacy not only to corruption problems but also to political problems. If cadres err on political matters, the harm they cost the Party is no less than corruption, if not more severe.

=== Historical materialism ===
Subscribing to the view that socialism will eventually triumph over capitalism, Xi has said "Marx and Engels's analysis of the basic contradictions of capitalist society is not outdated, nor is the historical materialist view that capitalism is bound to die out and socialism bound to win." Regarding dialectical materialism, Xi stated in 2022:

The party's history over the past century tells us that for the cause of the party and the people to progress, we must have a thorough understanding of the principal challenge [i.e. contradiction] facing our society and properly identify our central task. Only when this is done can the cause of the party and the people progress smoothly. Otherwise our cause will suffer setbacks. The [historical] resolution presents a full analysis of the party's strengths in focusing on China's principal challenge and central task when advancing work on all fronts. It emphasizes that, in modern China, the principal social contradictions have been the conflicts between imperialism and the Chinese nation, between feudalism and the masses. To achieve the great rejuvenation of the Chinese nation, struggles against imperialism and feudalism were necessary. It underscores that, after the basic completion of socialist transformation in China, the main internal contradiction became the conflict between the people's rapidly growing needs for economic and cultural development and the situation where economic and cultural development could meet those needs. The primary task for the people nationwide was to concentrate efforts on developing social productive forces, achieving national industrialization, and gradually meeting the increasing material and cultural needs of the people. It highlighted that, after reform and opening, the principal social contradiction in China was the conflict between the growing material and cultural needs of the people and the backwardness of social production. Resolving this primary contradiction became our central task. It further emphasizes that, in the new era, the principal social contradiction in China is the conflict between growing aspirations for a better life and the imbalances and inadequacies in development. . . . As Comrade Mao Zedong pointed out in ‘On Contradiction’: “The study of the various states of unevenness in contradictions, of the principal and non-principal contradictions and the principal and non-principal aspects of a contradiction constitutes an essential method by which a revolutionary political party correctly determines its strategic and tactical policies both in political and in military affairs. All communists must give it attention.

=== Patriotism ===
Xi has called on Chinese citizens to be patriotic, saying that "the feeling of devotion and sense of attachment to our motherland is a duty and responsibility of every Chinese. It is the foundation on which young Chinese in the new era can become winners in life. In contemporary China, the essence of patriotism is loving the country, the Party and socialism all at the same time". In Xi's view, patriotism "must begin at childhood ... focusing not only on the inculcation of knowledge ... but also on the strengthening of emotional cultivation, to ensure that red genes seep into the blood and soak into the heart." At the 100th anniversary of the May Fourth Movement in 2019, Xi said:

Whoever does not love their country—or even worse, deceives and betrays their motherland—is a disgrace and has no place anywhere in the world. Love of our country, the feeling of devotion and sense of attachment to our motherland is a duty and responsibility for every Chinese. . . . In contemporary China, the essence of patriotism is loving our country, our Party and socialism all and at the same time.

In Xi's view, supporting the Chinese Dream means every Chinese can "closely align one's ambitions with the future of the motherland and one's life with the destiny of the nation." He said "science knows no borders, but scientists have a motherland" and added that while "companies and business transactions know no borders ... entrepreneurs have a motherland". He continued "excellent entrepreneurs ... must closely align the development of their companies with the prosperity of their country and nation as well as the well-being of their countrymen. They should take the initiative to bear and share the burden and worries of their country". In 2020, he further elaborated by calling on companies to "repay society with sincerity ... throw yourself into various charitable causes ... donate money and resources, participate in volunteer work ... care about your employees ... and work hard to prevent job losses". Xi has also called on the overseas Chinese diaspora to be more patriotic, saying "no matter where you are, you must always put the motherland and the [Chinese] people in your heart . . . live out the glorious tradition of 'those who study abroad repays their motherland: be a defender and evangelist of patriotism".

=== Democracy ===
Xi Jinping rejects notions of liberal democracy for China. According to Xi's view of democracy, China "must not blindly copy the development models of other countries nor accept their dictation. The state system which is a socialist state under the people's democratic dictatorship led by the working class ... is under the leadership of the CPC ... and the principle of democratic centralism". During a visit to Europe in 2014, Xi Jinping said that a multi-party system would not work for China. He said China had experimented in the past with various political systems, including multi-party democracy, warning that copying foreign political or development models could be catastrophic because of its unique historical and social conditions. According to Xi, Chinese history after the fall of the Qing dynasty demonstrates that Western political systems do not fit China's national circumstances. Xi states, "China had experimented with constitutional monarchy, imperial restoration, parliamentary politics, multi-partisan arrangement, presidential system, and others. All diverse political forces came unto the historical stage but none of them had successfully offered 'a correct answer' to the question of national salvation." Xi considers China to be a democracy, saying that "China's socialist democracy is the most comprehensive, genuine and effective democracy."

In Xi's view, whether a country is a democracy or not depends on whether its people are "really the masters of the country", stating:

If the people are awakened only for voting but enter a dormant period soon after, if they are given a song and dance during campaigning but have no say after the election, or if they are favored during canvassing but are left out in the cold after the election, such a democracy is not a true democracy.

Xi has coined the "Eight Whethers" criteria to judge whether a political system is truly democratic:

The best way to evaluate whether a country's political system is democratic and effective is to observe whether the succession of its leaders is orderly and in line with the law, whether all the people can manage state and social affairs and economic and cultural undertakings according to law, whether the people can express their requirements without hindrance, whether all sectors of the society can effectively participate in the country's political affairs, whether national decision-making can be conducted in a scientific and democratic way, whether talents in all fields can be part of the national leadership and administrative systems through fair competition, whether the governing party can achieve leadership over state affairs in accordance with constitutional and legal provisions, and whether the exercise of power can be kept under effective restraint and oversight.

He later further coined the "Four Not Onlys, Four But Alsos":

[Whether a country is democratic] depends on not only whether the people have the right to vote, but also whether they have the right to participate extensively; not only whether they have been given verbal promises during elections, but also how many of these promises are fulfilled after elections; not only whether there are set political procedures and rules in systems and laws, but also whether these systems and laws are truly enforced; and not only whether the rules and procedures for the exercise of power are democratic, but also whether power is genuinely subject to public oversight and checks.

China's definition of democracy is different from liberal democracies and is rooted in Marxism–Leninism, and is based on the concepts of people's democratic dictatorship and democratic centralism. Xi has additionally coined the term whole-process people's democracy which he said was about having "the people as masters". Foreign analysts and observers have widely disputed that China is a democracy, saying that it is a one-party authoritarian state and Xi an authoritarian leader. Xi has sometimes referred to as "traditionalist" or "neo-authoritarian".

== Economics ==
In Xi's view, China's socialist market economy fundamentally remains a socialist one: "We are developing a market economy under the major premise of the leadership of the CCP and the socialist system. We must never forget the attribute ‘socialism.’ The reason for saying that it is a socialist market economy is to uphold the superiority of our system and effectively prevent the drawbacks of the capitalist market economy." In 2015, Xi said that "Comrade Mao Zedong creatively put forward . . . original views on the development of our country's economy" which is that "the dominant role of state ownership cannot be changed, and the leading role of the state-owned economy cannot be changed."

Xi has overseen the increase of "Socialist Political Economy With Chinese Characteristics" as a major study topic for academics in China, aiming to decrease the influence of Western-influenced economics. Though he has called a stop to what he considers to be "disorderly expansion of capital", he has also said that "it is necessary to stimulate the vitality of capital of all types, including nonpublic capital, and give full play to its positive role." Xi has formulated the new concept for development, stressing the importance of high-quality development rather than "inflated growth". He has stated China has abandoned a growth-at-all-costs strategy which Xi refers to as "GDP heroism". Instead, Xi said other social issues such as environmental protection are important. Xi has called for China's economy to be made stronger, calling for the building of a "great power economy". In 2016, Xi called the economy "large but not strong" and "bloated, puffy, and infirm". He described the economy being "not strong" as "per capita income and living standards [of China] being not in the same league with Western countries" and that it "needs to work harder to transform its economic strength into international institutional authority." Xi called on China to develop an "independent innovation ability" as "currently, a new round of technological revolution and industrial transformation is reshaping the global innovation landscape and economic structure".

Since 2012, Xi has described the central task of China's social policy as "lifting the bottom". In 2013, he introduced targeted poverty alleviation, which included policies like direct cash transfers, improving housing through relocation and repair funds, skills development, healthcare, job assistance, and others.

=== Technology ===
Xi has called for China to be more self-reliant on technology, warning of export restrictions on technologies. According to Xi, China's "greatest hidden danger lies in core technologies being under the control of others." In 2013, he said:

Now even the import of relatively usual technology faces all kinds of restrictions. When we were weak, everyone wanted to sell their technology to us. Now that we are developed, no one wants to sell us their technology. They are afraid that this will make us big and strong.

In 2015, he added:

At the current development stage of our country, not only is it impossible to acquire core technologies from others, even obtaining ordinary high-end technology is very difficult. Advanced Western countries have the mentality that training up the apprentice will starve the master to death. Hence, we must gain a foothold on independent innovation.

Xi considers advancing China's innovation capacity and developing "asymmetrical assassin's maces", referring to new technological advancements, to be crucial to China's national interests and as "priority areas of science and technology that concern the future". In his view, developing these technologies would allow China to "stand up" and "gain proactive power in competition and development", as well as allow China to drive the development of new industries, upgrade China's status in the global production chain from low-end to high-end, help improve people's livelihood, "gain proactive power in fierce international military competition" and advance military–civil fusion. In 2021, he said:

Since the beginning of the 21st century, global scientific and technological innovation has entered a period of unprecedented intensity and activity. A new round of techno-scientific revolution and industrial transformation is reshaping the global innovation landscape and economic structure... Never before had science and technology had such a profound impact on the future and destiny of the country... If China wants to be strong and rejuvenated, it must vigorously develop science and technology and strive to become the world's major science center and innovation highland. We are closer to the goal of the great rejuvenation of the Chinese nation than at any time in history, and we need to build a world power in science and technology more than at any time in history!

=== Real economy ===
Xi has emphasized the real economy as opposed to what he terms as the "virtual economy", which he says misallocate resources and contribute to systemic financial risk. According to Xi, "At whatever stage of economic development we are, the real economy remains the foundation of our growth and the basis for gaining the initiative in international economic competition". At the Central Economic Work Conference in August 2015, he said declining profit margins in the real economy were due to "large amount of finance flowing to the virtual economy" which "causes expanding asset bubbles [and] emerging financial risks". Xi has also stated that "houses are for living, not for speculation". Xi described real economy as:

The real economy is the foundation of a country's economy and source of wealth. Advanced manufacturing is one key area of the real economy and . . . economic development cannot be separated from the real economy at any time.

=== Private sector ===
Regarding private businesses, Xi said in 2016 that "the precondition for the nonstate economy to develop healthily" is for "nonstate economy persons" to "listen and follow the Party". However, Xi has dismissed calls to fully end private businesses, saying in 2018 that:

for a period of time, some people in society have made some remarks that deny and doubt the private economy. For example, some people put forward the so-called ‘the Exit of Private Economy,’ saying that the private economy has fulfilled its mission and will withdraw from the stage of history; some people put forward the so-called ‘new nationalization theory,’ distorting the current mixed ownership reform in the new round and calling it the new nationalization movement. . . . These statements are completely wrong and do not conform to the CCP's major policies.

Xi spoke out against wealth inequality in a 2021 Qiushi article, stating "We cannot allow the gap between the rich and the poor to continue growing—for the poor to keep getting poorer while the rich continue growing richer. We cannot permit the wealth gap to become an unbridgeable gulf". He added "We must maintain the public ownership system as the mainstay and simultaneously develop the economics of a variety of ownership systems. . . . We should allow some people to get rich first, while emphasizing that those who get rich first should bring along others and help them get rich".

=== State-owned enterprises ===
Xi sees state-owned enterprises (SOEs) as an "important material pillar and the political foundation for socialism with Chinese characteristics" and an "important pillar and source of strength that the Party depends on to rule and to prosper the country". He has called on SOEs to be made "strong, excellent, and huge" and called on central SOEs to acquire global "competitiveness, innovativeness, controlling power, influence, and risk resilience". In 2021, Xi said "state-owned enterprises in our country have made historic contributions to the economic and social development, scientific and technological progress, national defense construction, and people's livelihood improvement, and they have made outstanding meritorious service! Their contributions cannot be ignored!".

== Society ==
=== Culture ===
Xi has intensified efforts for a revival of traditional Chinese culture. He has called traditional culture the "soul" of the nation and the "foundation" of the CCP's culture. He has praised the "splendid Chinese civilization", calling the CCP's governance part of "the uninterrupted development of a civilization for several thousand years" which is "rarely seen among nations in the world". Regarding culture, Xi said:

Propaganda must . . . make clear that the Chinese nation has, in its civilizational development process of 5000 years, created a wide-ranging and profound Chinese culture. China's culture has accumulated the profound spiritual pursuits of the Chinese nation, contains the most basic spiritual genome of the Chinese nation, represents the unique spiritual symbols of the Chinese nation and the rich nourishments for the Chinese nation to multiply endlessly, develop, and expand; to make clear that China's excellent traditional culture is significantly superior . . . and represents an important spiritual pillar through which the Chinese nation can constantly strive to renew itself, unite, and struggle . . . and make clear that socialism with Chinese characteristics is rooted in the soil of Chinese culture . . . and the Chinese nation will therefore be able to create new glories from China's traditional culture.

Xi has also called for integrating the basic tenets of Marxism with China's traditional culture. He has established the "Four Confidences", which has later been added to the CCP constitution, calling for CCP members, government officials and the Chinese people to be "confident in our chosen path, confident in our guiding theories, confident in our political system, and confident in our culture." Xi said:

As I have said, standing on the vast land of 9.6 million square kilometers, nourished by the cultural nutrients amassed over a lengthy period of national struggle, and supported by the formidable strength of 1.3 billion of united Chinese people, we have an immeasurably wide stage, unfathomably deep historical backing, and infinite determination to walk our own path. The Chinese people-every one of them-should be confident of this. To hold firmly to our self-confidence in the Chinese socialist path, theory, and system boils down to holding firmly to our cultural self-confidence-a more basic, deeper, and resilient power.

Xi unveiled Global Civilization Initiative in 2023, calling for "respecting the diversity of civilizations, advocating the common values of humanity, valuing the inheritance and innovation of civilizations, and strengthening international people-to-people exchanges and cooperation". Xi has promoted initiatives to boost China's birthrate. At a meeting of the All China Women's Federation, Xi called for "a new marriage and childbirth culture, strengthen guidance of young people's views on marriage, parenthood and family". Xi has called for China to have more "discourse power". In 2022, he said the CCP must:

Collect and refine the defining symbols and best elements of Chinese culture and showcase them to the world. Accelerate the development of China's discourse and narrative systems, tell China's story well, make China's voice heard, and present a China that is worthy of trust, adoration, and respect. Strengthen our international communications capabilities, make our communications more effective, and strive to strengthen China's discursive power in international affairs so that it is commensurate with our composite national strength and international status.

=== History ===
Xi has praised the "splendid Chinese civilization", saying "our country possesses a million years of human history, 10,000 years of cultural history, and 5,000 years of civilization history". He said China was "the birthplace of the people from the East", "the first to invent gunpowder", "the earliest or among the earliest to invent or discover musical instruments, the canoe, irrigation facilities and astronomy" and had "forcefully pushed forward the advancement of human civilization with its technologies in papermaking, gunpowder, printing, the compass, astronomy and the calendar, philosophy, and the concept of putting the people first". He added "the English philosopher Francis Bacon once said that the invention of printing, gunpowder, and the compass changed the face of the world-not one kingdom, religion, or individual influenced the cause of humanity greater than these three inventions". Xi has dismissed calls to focus less on history, stating:

In comparison with the China from before the establishment of the New China, or in comparison with the China from after the Opium War, the present-day China is poles apart! In the present world, if it is asked which party, which country and which nation can be self-confident, then the Chinese Communist Party, the People's Republic of China, and the Chinese nation have reason for self-confidence. On this point, truth is on our side. In the West, there are people who say that China should change the angle of its historical propaganda, that it should no longer make propaganda about its history of humiliation. . . . As I see it, we cannot heed this. Forgetting history means betrayal. History objectively exists. History is the best textbook. A nation without historical memory does not have a future.

In his political discourse, Xi incorporates historical examples and themes. He describes history as "the best teacher" and "the best textbook". Especially since the COVID-19 pandemic, Xi encourages the Chinese people to develop "historical self-confidence". Xi includes ancient history in his political discourse, characterizing China as a "splendid civilization" and highlighting its five thousand years of history. He often cites the Four Great Inventions as a source of national pride and China's contribution to humanity. In his discourse for foreign audiences regarding China's peaceful rise, Xi quotes the Confucian saying, "If you do not want to have it yourself, you should not want to impose it on others." In his discourse on the community of shared future, Xi cites the third century scholar Chen Shou's saying that "delicious soup is made by combining different ingredients."

In October 2019, Xi said that due to the Confucian system, China had "forged a complete set of state and governance system" which "enabled China to be always on the lead in human history for a long period of time". He said the system included "the imperial court system, the system of prefectures and counties, the land system, the taxation system, the civil service examination system, the supervision system, and the military system" and added "many of these systems were modeled by neighboring nations". He said "the Chinese characters we use today are not basically different from the oracle bone inscriptions". He concluded that the CCP forms a part of "the uninterrupted development of a civilization for several thousand years" which "rarely seen among nations in the world". Xi contrasted the successes of China's "state and governance system" with the foreign political models, namely "constitutional monarchy, parliamentarism, multiparty politics, and presidentialism", that China attempted in the 20th century which failed to stop the Century of Humiliation. He interpreted the turning point being the arrival of Marxism to China:

After Marxism was preached to China, scientific socialism was enthusiastically welcomed by the Chinese people, and eventually took root and blossomed in China. This was certainly not accidental because Marxism was compatible with and connected to several thousand years of excellent Chinese history, culture, and the worldviews that the people instinctively apply in their daily lives.

Regarding history, Xi concludes:

If we have a deep appreciation of modern Chinese history, contemporary Chinese history, and Chinese revolutionary history, it is not difficult to discover that, if not for the leadership of the Chinese Communist Party, our country and our nation would neither have attained today's achievements nor global status. With regard to the important principle of upholding the Party's leadership, our minds must be especially clear, our eyes especially sharp, and our position especially firm. There must be no ambiguity or wavering.

Xi opposes contrasting the Mao Zedong era and the reform and opening up era to negate one, a concept called the Two Cannot be Denied. He has said that "the historical period after reform and opening up cannot be used to negate the historical period before reform and opening up, nor can the historical period before reform and opening up be used to negate the historical period after reform and opening up". In 2013, Xi said:

Our Party has led the people in socialist construction in two historical periods, "before reform and opening up" and "after reform and opening up". These are two periods that are interrelated and have significant differences, but in essence they are both practical explorations of our Party leading the people in socialist construction. The historical period after reform and opening up cannot be used to negate the historical period before reform and opening up, nor can the historical period before reform and opening up be used to negate the historical period after reform and opening up. If we had completely negated Comrade Mao Zedong at that time, would our Party still be able to stand? Would our country's socialist system still be able to stand? Of course it would not be able to stand, and if it did not stand, there would be chaos in the world.

=== Philosophy ===
In recent years, top political leaders of the CCP such as Xi have overseen the rehabilitation of ancient Chinese philosophical figures like Han Fei into the mainstream of Chinese thought alongside Confucianism. At a meeting with other officials in 2013, he quoted Confucius, saying "he who rules by virtue is like the Pole Star, it maintains its place, and the multitude of stars pay homage." While visiting Shandong, the birthplace of Confucius, in November, he told scholars that the Western world was "suffering a crisis of confidence" and that the CCP has been "the loyal inheritor and promoter of China's outstanding traditional culture." Han Fei gained new prominence with favourable citations; one sentence of Han Fei's that Xi quoted appeared thousands of times in official Chinese media at the local, provincial, and national levels. Xi has additionally supported the Neo-Confucian philosopher Wang Yangming, telling local leaders to promote him. Xi has called for academics to "accelerate the construction of philosophy and social sciences with Chinese characteristics" to increase China's "discursive power".

=== Arts ===
Xi supports a socialist artistic revival, including the promotion of patriotic art and red classics. Since the 18th Party Congress, Xi has emphasized utilizing red resources, telling red stories, and inheriting red genes. On 15 October 2014, Xi Jinping emulated the Yan'an Forum with his 'Speech at the Forum on Literature and Art.' Consistent with Mao's view in the Yan'an Talks, Xi believes works of art should be judged by political criteria. In 2021, Xi quoted the Yan'an Talks during the opening ceremony of the 11th National Congress of the China Federation of Literary and Art Circles and the 10th National Congress of the Chinese Writers Association. According to Xi, art should be judged by political criteria. This view rejects the concept of art-for-art's-sake and contends that art should serve the goal of national rejuvenation. Xi criticizes market-driven art which he deems sensationalist, particularly works which "exaggerate society's dark side" for profit. He ordered the arts industry to "tell China's stories and spread Chinese voices to strengthen the country's international communication capacity." Xi states that Chinese writers should follow the Party's leadership, serve the cause of socialism, and "let people see the good, feel hope, [and] have dreams".

=== Education ===
According to Xi, the "fundamental task" of education is "to develop talents who support the Chinese Communist Party's leadership and the system of socialism with Chinese characteristics one generation after another." He has criticized education for being "all about grades, all about getting into good schools, all about certificates, all about essays, all about hats, i.e., titles and honors" which prioritized privileged children from wealthy families over the general population.

In the 2018 National Education Conference, Xi said "Our education must never cultivate destroyers and gravediggers of socialism, and must never cultivate people who "have Chinese faces but not Chinese hearts, lack Chinese sentiments, and are devoid of Chinese flavor"! That would be a failure of education". He has spoken against foreign influence, saying in 2018 that "various hostile forces have never stopped implementing strategies to Westernize and divide our country". Regarding youth, he quoted Mao Zedong by saying imperialists would have no effect on the first and second generations after the founding of People’s Republic of China, but they might hope to effect on the third and fourth generations. He added "Currently, our college students are the third and fourth generations" and added "In the future, there will be dozens of generations. The fight over the youth is long-term and difficult, we cannot lose, and cannot afford to lose". He called for establishing youth that is "successors to socialism" and "establishing firm ideals and beliefs", particularly "ideals of communist and socialism with Chinese characteristics". He added "Today’s young people have lived in peace for too long, they have not experienced the pain of a nation struggling between life and death, have not been tested through blood and fire, and have not taken part in difficult battles", while saying "If we do not guide them and educate them, it is difficult for them to hold the correct ideals and they might even go astray".

=== Law ===
Consistent with the Marxist–Leninist principle of unified state power, Xi Jinping opposes legal concepts such as separation of powers and judicial independence as "Western erroneous views." Xi states that the two fundamental aspects of the "socialist rule of law with Chinese characteristics" are: (1) that the political and legal organs (including courts, the police, and the procuratorate) must believe in the law and uphold the law, and (2) all political and legal officials must follow the CCP. Xi's view of the rule of law tends to equate the rule of law with the development of legislation. In his writings on socialist rule of law, Xi has emphasized traditional Chinese concepts including people as the root of the state (mingben), "the ideal of no lawsuit" (tianxia wusong), "respecting rite and stressing law" (longli zhongfa), "virtue first, penalty second" (dezhu xingfu), and "promoting virtue and being prudent in punishment" (mingde shenfa).

Judicial policy during the general secretaryship of Xi Jinping has highlighted increased professionalization of the judiciary and autonomy in routine cases, while maintaining the subordination of the judiciary to the CCP. Xi emphasizes eliminating "judicial corruption and court decisions influenced by money, power, and personal connection." Since announced by Xi in 2014, Comprehensive Law-Based Governance has been the principal banner of state legal policy.

Xi opposes Western-style judicial independence and states that the judiciary is obliged to "uphold the absolute leadership of the Party." Xi stated that "Every Party and government organization, and every leading cadre ... must not use the Party's leadership as a shield to substitute the law with personal opinions, suppress the law with power, or manipulate the law for personal gain. Certain matters submitted to the Party Committee for oversight; however, this oversight must not involve personal interference or protectionism. It should be political, procedural, and duty-bound."

=== Internet ===
In 2018, Xi said that "Without internet security there is no national security, economic and social stability do not function, and it becomes difficult to safeguard the interests of the majority of the people".

=== Religion ===
Xi is a proponent of the "Sinicization of Chinese religion". At the 19th Party Congress, Xi stated, "We will fully implement the Party's basic policy on religious affairs, uphold the principle that religions in China must be Chinese in orientation and provide active guidance to religions so that they can adapt themselves to a socialist society."

=== Ethnic minorities ===
In 2014, Xi called to foster a sense of community for the Chinese nation among ethnic minorities. Xi outlined his official views relations between the majority Han Chinese and ethnic minorities by saying "[n]either Han chauvinism nor local ethnic chauvinism is conducive to the development of a community for the Chinese nation." Xi has added:

Regional ethnic autonomy is not the exclusive autonomy of a certain ethnic group; ethnic autonomous areas are not areas exclusive to a certain ethnic group. We must be clear on this point, otherwise, we will go in the wrong direction.

In 2014, he called for greater integration among Han and non-Han students:

Efforts should be made to actively promote the integration of schools for both Han and ethnic minority students, including mixed-class arrangements, in order to create an atmosphere and conditions for learning and progressing together, and to avoid situations where students of different ethnic groups still stick to their own groups and walk in their own circles when they arrive at school.

==== 2026 ethnic unity law ====
The Law on Promoting Ethnic Unity and Progress is the People's Republic of China's (PRC) guiding legislation concerning ethnic minorities. The law was introduced by the National People's Congress (NPC)'s Ethnic Affairs Committee and submitted to the NPC on 8 September 2025. It was signed into law on 12 March 2026 and enacted on 1 July 2026. The law codifies CCP general secretary Xi Jinping's policies regarding the sinicization of ethnic minorities. The law has been widely criticized by scholars, the United Nations High Commissioner for Human Rights, multiple governments, former United Nations special rapporteurs, and human rights activists outside of China. The law's promotion of extraterritorial enforcement has been likened to transnational repression.

=== Human rights ===
Xi has dismissed Western liberal definitions of human rights, saying:

Karl Marx and Friedrich Engels endorsed the historical value of the bourgeois theory of human rights, meanwhile they firmly refuted the theory's denial of the social, historical, and class-based nature of human rights. “The individual,” Marx pointed out, “is a social being.” He also argued that “[a] right can never be higher than the economic structure of society and its cultural development conditioned thereby”.

He added:

Just as democracy is not an ornament to be used for decoration, neither are human rights. In recent years, some Western countries have been bogged down by conflict between political parties, government dishonesty, social disorder, and epidemics that have spiralled out of control. Political polarization, wealth disparities, and racial tensions have all intensified, while racism, populism, and xenophobia have become rife, thus bringing human rights issues to the fore. Yet these countries still use slogans like ‘universal human rights’ and ‘human rights over sovereignty’ as a pretext for forcing Western conceptions and systems of democracy and human rights on others and for meddling in the internal affairs of other countries. This has only served to cause recurrent military conflict, ongoing unrest, and the displacement of many from their homes in a number of countries.

=== Football ===
Xi is an avid football fan. While working in Hebei, it was reported that Xi often asked his friend Nie Weiping, a professional Go player, for football tickets.

In 2011, Xi outlined a vision to turn China from a footballing minnow to a football superpower. He outlined a three-stage plan for the national team: to qualify for another World Cup, to host a World Cup and to win a World Cup. In 2015, Xi approved China's 50-point plan for the sport, which included including football in the national school curriculum and setting up 50,000 football schools in the country by 2025. That year, he stated, "My biggest hope for Chinese soccer is that its teams become among the world's best." However, according to CNN, "poor financial decisions and alleged high-level corruption coupled with a three-year pandemic have left the sport in tatters".
