= Peter Zeihan =

American author and geopolitical analyst (born 1973)

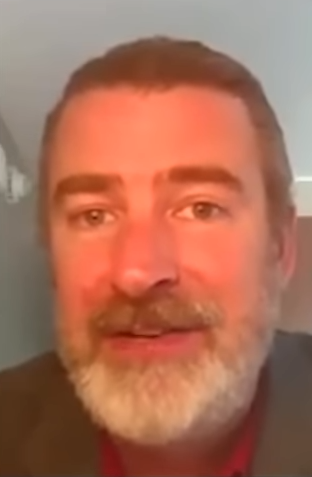
- Zeihan in October 2022
- Born: Peter Henry Zeihan; January 18, 1973 (age 53)
- Education: Truman State University (BS); University of Otago
- Occupations: Geopolitical analyst; Author
- Peter Zeihan's voice Recorded December 2022
- Website: zeihan.com

Peter Henry Zeihan (/ˈzaɪ.ən/; born January 18, 1973) is an American author and geopolitical analyst. He is the founder of the consulting firm Zeihan on Geopolitics and a former vice president at the geopolitical intelligence firm Stratfor. Zeihan has written several books, including The Accidental Superpower (2014), The Absent Superpower (2017), Disunited Nations (2020), and The End of the World Is Just the Beginning (2022).

== Early life and education ==
Zeihan was born in 1973 and raised in Marshalltown, Iowa, as the adopted son of educators Jerald and Agnes Zeihan. He graduated from Marshalltown High School in 1992.

He earned a Bachelor of Science in political science from Truman State University (then Northeast Missouri State University) in 1995, followed by a postgraduate diploma in Asian studies at the University of Otago in New Zealand in 1997. Zeihan also attended the University of Kentucky's Patterson School of Diplomacy and International Commerce.

== Career ==
After completing his education, Zeihan worked for the American embassy in Australia and at the Center for Political and Strategic Studies, a think tank founded by Susan Eisenhower.

In 2000, Zeihan joined the Austin, Texas-based geopolitical intelligence firm Stratfor as an analyst. Over 12 years, he rose to the position of vice president.

He left Stratfor in 2012 to establish Zeihan on Geopolitics, a consulting firm serving energy companies, financial institutions, business associations, agricultural organizations, universities, and government entities.

=== Writings ===
While at Stratfor, Zeihan co-authored his first book, A Crucible of Nations, with Lauren Goodrich in 2011. He also contributed to Stratfor’s 2010 “Decade Forecast,” stating, “we expect the economic collapse of China in this coming decade,” and arguing that structural imbalances would push the system to a “break point” that would shatter the Chinese economic model.

In 2014, he published The Accidental Superpower, which explores the influence of geography on economic, industrial, and military competitiveness. The book emphasizes the strategic importance of navigable rivers, ocean access, transportation infrastructure, and demographic trends.

Subsequent works include The Absent Superpower (2017), Disunited Nations (2020), and The End of the World Is Just the Beginning (2022), each expanding on geopolitical trends, demographic shifts, and the future of globalism.

==== Criticism ====
Critics of Zeihan’s work note that he adopts a deterministic view of demographic and geopolitical trends.

Money & Macro criticizes Zeihan's long-running claim, made since 2010, that China will collapse within a decade, noting that while his arguments about demographics, debt, and energy dependence highlight real challenges, many of them are overstated or selective, and the Chinese government has implemented policies to mitigate these risks.

In the 2023 update of The Accidental Superpower, Zeihan appended evaluations of his earlier predictions, acknowledging overestimates of Russia’s military strength and underestimates of Canadian national identity’s influence in Alberta.

== Personal life ==
In 2001, Zeihan resided in Austin, Texas, though he now resides in Morrison, Colorado. He is an independent voter.

== Publications ==
- Goodrich, Lauren; Zeihan, Peter (2011). A Crucible of Nations: The Geopolitics of the Caucasus. Austin, TX: Stratfor Global Intelligence. ISBN 9781461109426.
- The Accidental Superpower: The Next Generation of American Preeminence and the Coming Global Disaster. Grand Central Publishing. November 4, 2014. ISBN 9781455583669.
- The Absent Superpower: The Shale Revolution and a World without America. Zeihan on Geopolitics. January 1, 2017. ISBN 9780998505206.
- Disunited Nations: The Scramble for Power in an Ungoverned World. Harper Business. March 3, 2020. ISBN 9780062913685.
- The End of the World is just the Beginning | The End of the World Is Just the Beginning: Mapping the Collapse of Globalization. Harper Business. June 14, 2022. ISBN 9780063230477.
- Zeihan, Peter (December 26, 2023). The Accidental Superpower: Ten Years On. United States: Twelve (published 2023). ISBN 9781538767344.

== See also ==
- George Friedman, founder of Stratfor
