= The Next 100 Years: A Forecast for the 21st Century =

2009 nonfiction book by George Friedman

The Next 100 Years
- Author: George Friedman
- Language: English
- Publication date: 2009
- Publication place: United States
- ISBN: 0-385-51705-X

The Next 100 Years is a 2009 speculative nonfiction book by George Friedman. In the book, Friedman attempts to predict the major geopolitical events and trends of the 21st century. Friedman also speculates in the book on changes in technology and culture that may take place during this period.

== Overview ==
Friedman predicts that the United States will remain the dominant global superpower throughout the 21st century and that the history of the 21st century will consist mainly of attempts by other world powers to challenge US dominance. Although mainly about the geopolitics and wars of the century, the book also makes some economic, social, and technological predictions for the 21st century.

=== Second Cold War ===
In the 2010s and early 2020s, the conflict between the US and Islamic fundamentalists will die down, and a second Cold War, less extensive and shorter than the first, will take place between the United States and Russia. It will be characterized by Russian attempts to expand its sphere of influence into Central and Eastern Europe, coupled with a buildup of Russian military capabilities. During this period, Russia's military will pose a regional challenge to the United States. The United States will become a close ally to some Central and Eastern European countries, all of whom will be dedicated to resisting Russian geopolitical threats during this period. Friedman speculates in the book that the United States will probably become a close ally of some Central and Eastern European countries: Poland, the Czech Republic, Slovakia, Hungary, and Romania. Around 2015, a Polish-led military alliance of countries in Central and Eastern Europe will begin to form, which is referred to in the book as the "Polish Bloc."

=== Russian and Chinese fragmentation ===
In the early 2020s, the New Cold War will end when the economic strain and political pressure on Russia, coupled with high military spending, Russia's declining population, and poor infrastructure, cause the federal government of Russia to completely collapse, much like the dissolution of the Soviet Union. Other former Soviet countries will fragment as well.

Around this time, China will politically and culturally fragment as well. The book asserts that the rapid economic development of China since 1980 will cause internal pressures and inequalities in Chinese society. Regional tension in mainland China will grow between the prosperous coastal regions and the impoverished interior regions. Friedman gives two possible scenarios: that the Chinese central government will expel outside interests and rule with an iron fist to keep the country together, or that China will fragment, with the central government gradually losing much of its real power and the provinces becoming increasingly autonomous. He works on the assumption that fragmentation is the most likely scenario.

In the 2020s, the collapse of the Russian government and the fragmentation of mainland China will leave Eurasia in general chaos. Other powers will then move in to annex or establish spheres of influence in the area, and in many cases, regional leaders will secede. In Russia, North Caucasus and other Muslim regions, as well as the Pacific Far East will become independent, Finland will annex Karelia, Romania will annex Moldova, Tibet will gain independence with help from India, Taiwan will extend its influence into mainland China, while the United States, European powers, and Japan will re-create regional spheres of influence in mainland China.

=== New Great Powers Arise ===
In the 2020s and 2030s, three great powers will emerge in Eurasia: Turkey, Poland, and Japan. Initially supported by the United States, Turkey will expand its sphere of influence and become a great power, much as it was during the time of the Ottoman Empire. The Turkish sphere of influence will extend into the Arab world, which will have increasingly fragmented by then, and north into Russia and other former Soviet countries. Israel will continue to be a powerful nation and will be the only country in the immediate region to remain outside the Turkish sphere of influence. However, Israel will be forced to come to an accommodation with Turkey due to Turkey's military and economic power.

Meanwhile, Japan will expand its economic influence to regions of coastal China, the Russian Far East, and many Pacific Islands. Friedman predicts that Japan will change its foreign policy during this time period, becoming more geopolitically aggressive, beginning a major military buildup. Friedman predicts that Japan will build military strength capable of regionally projecting power across East Asia during this time.

Finally, Poland will continue to lead its military alliance, the "Polish Bloc." Poland and its allies will be a major power, much like the time of the Polish–Lithuanian Commonwealth. Now possessing substantial military strength, Poland will expand its economic influence into what was formerly European Russia, and will begin to compete with Turkey for influence in the important economic region of the Volga River Valley. Around this time, space programs for military use will begin to emerge, and Japan and Turkey will increasingly begin to develop military capabilities in space.

=== Tensions build ===
At the beginning of this period, the United States will be allied with all three powers. By 2020, the United States will have been allied with Turkey and Japan for over 75 years. However, in the years after the end of the Second Cold War and collapse of Russia, the United States will gradually become uneasy as Turkey and Japan expand their military power and economic influence. Establishing regional spheres of influence, Turkey and Japan will begin to threaten US interests. The growth of Turkish and Japanese naval power, and their military activities in space will be particularly disturbing to the United States.

The book asserts that Japan and Turkey, having similar interests, probably will form an alliance near the end of this period, in an effort to counter the overwhelming global power of the United States. The book also speculates that Germany and Mexico may possibly join this anti-United States coalition, although it is generally unlikely. In this coming confrontation, the United States will be allied with the "Polish Bloc," probably with the UK, a restabilized China, India, and a reunified Korea. By the 2040s, there will be global tension and competition between these two alliances.

=== Demographic change ===
The book also predicts that decades of low birthrates in developed countries, especially in Europe, will result in dramatic cultural, social, and political shifts through the first half of the 21st century. These countries will experience economic and social strain, caused by a diminishing working age demographic and a rapidly aging population. As a result, in the 2020s and 2030s, Western nations will begin to compete for immigrants. In particular, the United States will greatly ease immigration controls, and will begin trying to entice foreigners - especially Mexicans - to immigrate to the United States.

However, later in the century, as robots begin to make human work obsolete, mass unemployment will result, and the United States, suffering from a labor surplus, will move to limit immigration again.

=== World War III ===
In the mid-21st century, around the year 2050, a Third World War will take place, between the United States, the "Polish Bloc", the UK, India, and China on one side, and Turkey and Japan on the other. According to Friedman, "I can’t possibly know the details of this war, or even its timing. But I can lay out some of the principles and imagine some of the details." The book then describes one detailed scenario, to illustrate how this war might occur.

According to the imagined scenario Friedman lays out, the war will be started by a coordinated Turkish-Japanese sneak attack against the United States and its allies in order to contest American power over Eurasia. In the scenario given, the attack will take place at a time in which the US will be taken completely off guard, and 5:00 p.m. on November 24, 2050 (Thanksgiving Day) is hypothesized as a potential time. According to Friedman, "it doesn’t have to be Thanksgiving, but it has to be an unexpected time when U.S. leadership is not at its full strength," comparing the attack to Pearl Harbor or the Korean War, which both commenced on a Sunday.

The Turkish-Japanese alliance's initial strike will cripple the military capabilities of the United States and its allies. The Turkish-Japanese alliance will then attempt to enter negotiations, demanding the United States accept the Turkish-Japanese's alliance's status as a fellow superpower. However, the United States will reject the terms and go to war, refusing to accept Turkish and Japanese hegemony over Eurasia. The Turkish-Japanese alliance will initially possess a military advantage after crippling the United States' military during its first strike. In addition, the Turkish-Japanese alliance will draw Germany and France into entering the war on their side. However, as the war progresses, the balance of power will begin to shift as the United States rebuilds and increases its military capabilities, and pioneers the use of new military technologies. The war will ultimately end with a victory by the United States and its allies.

The primary weapons of the war will be long-range hypersonic aircraft and infantrymen with highly sophisticated, powered body-armor. Control of space will be crucial over the course of the conflict, with space-based weapons systems and military bases on the Moon playing a significant role. The war will last about two or three years. According to Friedman, the war will be a limited war, and precision-guided munitions will minimize collateral damage. Friedman estimates that the war will cost somewhere around 50,000 lives.

=== Post-war ===
Following the war, the United States will enjoy a new post-war boom (similar to the post–World War II economic expansion). This boom will begin in the 2050s after the war and last throughout the 2060s. The economic boom will come as a result of increased defense expenditures that lead to the development of new technologies, which will foster dramatic economic growth and increase US influence worldwide. In addition, the economic problems imposed by mass retirement of the Baby Boomers will fade away as the last of the Boomers die.

The United States will continue to be militarily and politically dominant over the world, and will also cement its hegemony over space. In particular, it will work to keep other powers from developing military capabilities in space. Meanwhile, Turkey will retain the bulk of its sphere of influence, although its de facto empire will become increasingly restive as a result of defeat, while Japan will lose its own sphere of influence. Under the US-dictated treaty that will end World War III, military restrictions will be imposed on both Japan and Turkey, although in practice they will be unenforceable and "merely a gratuitous humiliation victors enjoy imposing on the vanquished".

Meanwhile, Poland's power will grow due to the expanded size of the Polish Bloc as a result of the war. Although its infrastructure and economy will have been shattered, and despite having suffered particularly heavy casualties, Poland will exploit the Polish Bloc's increased sphere of influence to rebuild its economy. The United States will begin to look at the Polish Bloc's growing strength as a potential future threat. To prevent Polish hegemony in Europe, the United States will ally with its former enemies Japan (oldest closet ally) and Turkey, as well as the UK, to prevent Poland from dominating Eurasia, and will prevent Poland from making use of space for military purposes.

=== US–Mexican conflict ===
According to the book, North America will remain the center of gravity for the global economic and political system for at least a few more centuries following the 21st century. However, this does not guarantee that the United States will always dominate North America. In the decades following the war, starting in the 2070s, tensions between Mexico and the United States will rise. By this time, after decades of massive immigration, many parts of the United States, especially the South West, will become predominantly ethnically, culturally, and socially Mexican.

During this period, many ethnic Mexicans living in the Southwestern United States, especially those living in the Mexican Cession, will increasingly shun assimilation into US culture, due to the fact that they will live in a predominantly Mexican region, as well as the close proximity of Mexico. These demographic changes will be irreversible. Most people of Mexican background in the US Southwest will identify as Mexicans rather than Americans, and their national loyalty will be to Mexico and not the United States. During this period, Mexico will experience substantial economic and population growth. By the end of the 21st century, Mexico's military and economic power will have grown tremendously, and it will be in a position to challenge the United States for dominance of North America. In addition to an insurgency by Mexican separatists, political, cultural, and military tensions between the United States and Mexico will rise, and generate into a full-blown confrontation.

An extended crisis between the United States and Mexico will ensue, one that the United States will be unable to resolve through the use of military force. Most of the world, wary of US dominance, will secretly hope for a Mexican victory, especially Poland and Brazil, but no other nation will directly interfere. Friedman's final prediction is that the conflict will continue into the 22nd century.

=== Technological predictions ===
Among the technological predictions made in the book are the development of hypersonic aircraft and missiles, new space-based technology that will foster the development of military bases on the Moon and crewed military orbiting platforms (referred to in the book as "Battle Stars"), and armored robotic battle suits for soldiers that run on solar power. In addition, the Earth will come to be powered by solar energy collected from satellites beaming the energy down in the form of radiation to receiving stations on Earth, which will end dependence on hydrocarbons, and dramatic advances in robotics and genetic science will lead to a great increase in labor productivity, and significant increases in human longevity. It also hints at more widespread nuclear proliferation, claiming that Japan, Turkey, and Poland will have nuclear weapons by mid-century, as the technology will be a century old by that time, and "there won't be any mystery to how to build and deliver them."

== Revision of predictions ==
In 2015, Stratfor published a decade forecast for 2015 to 2025, which revised the predictions on China and Russia made in the book. Rather than the Russian government completely collapsing, it envisioned that the Russian government would lose much of its power, and the country would gradually fragment into a series of semi-autonomous regions. In addition, while the book had postulated that Chinese fragmentation was more likely than the re-imposition of authoritarian rule, the analysis predicted that regional fragmentation was now a less-likely scenario for China, with the most probable result being the re-imposition of strict authoritarian rule. It is unknown at present what implications this has for the book's further predictions, such as the Third World War and the US conflict with Mexico.
