= Roland Boer =

Australian theologian

Roland Theodore Boer (born 1961) is an Australian theologian and scholar of Marxism. He was awarded the Deutscher Memorial Prize in 2014.

== Career ==
Boer obtained a bachelor's degree in divinity from the University of Sydney. He was a professor at University of Newcastle (Australia). In 2004, he founded the peer-reviewed academic journal The Bible and Critical Theory.

In 2018, he was described by Xinhua as one of the world's top experts on Marxism. He teaches at the Dalian University of Technology's School of Marxism.

He runs the blog Stalin's Moustache.

== Notable works ==
=== Political Myth: On the Use and Abuse of Biblical Themes ===
Political Myth: On the Use and Abuse of Biblical Themes was released in 2009. It examines the political narratives that emerge from the Hebrew Bible on the political right and provides a framework to critique those narratives from the political left.

=== The Sacred Economy of Ancient Israel ===
The Sacred Economy of Ancient Israel, released in 2015, examines the intersection of economics and religion in ancient Israel through the lens of Marxist critical theory.

=== The Criticism of Heaven and Earth ===
The Criticism of Heaven and Earth is a series of books which explores the intersection of Marxism and religion. The fifth book in the series, In the Vale of Tears: On Marxism and Theology V, was released in 2012. In 2014 it was awarded the Deutscher Memorial Prize.

=== Socialism with Chinese Characteristics: A Guide for Foreigners ===
In Socialism with Chinese Characteristics: A Guide for Foreigners, released in 2021, Boer describes Gordon G. Chang's The Coming Collapse of China (2001) as an example of the "China doomer" approach to historical nihilism. Other examples cited by Boer include anti-communist tropes and atrocity propaganda, as well as "betrayal" narratives in which Deng Xiaoping is cast as a "traitor" who supposedly undid the achievements of China's revolution and brought capitalism to China—Boer characterises these as historical nihilism.

== Works ==
=== Books ===
- — (1997). Novel Histories: The Fiction of Biblical Criticism. Playing the Texts. Sheffield: Sheffield Academic Press. ISBN 978-1-85075-835-8.
- — (1999). Knockin' on heaven's door: the Bible and popular culture. Biblical limits. London; New York: Routledge. ISBN 978-0-415-19410-5.
- — (2001). Last stop before Antarctica: the Bible and postcolonialism in Australia. Sheffield: Sheffield Academic Press. ISBN 978-1-84127-170-5.
- — (2003). Marxist criticism of the Bible. London; New York: T&T Clark. ISBN 978-0-8264-6327-2. OCLC 54054313.
- — (2007). Bakhtin and genre theory in biblical studies. Atlanta: Society of Biblical Literature. ISBN 978-90-04-15737-8.
- — (2007). Criticism of heaven: on Marxism and theology. Historical Materialism Book Series. Vol. I. Leiden, The Netherlands; Boston: Brill. ISBN 978-90-04-16111-5. OCLC 141384381.
- — (2007). Rescuing the Bible. Blackwell Manifestos. Malden, Mass.: Blackwell. ISBN 978-1-4051-7020-8.
- — (2008). Last stop before Antarctica: the Bible and postcolonialism in Australia. Semeia Studies (2nd ed.). Leiden; Boston: Brill. ISBN 978-90-04-13080-7. OCLC 213466101.
- —; Økland, Jorunn (2008). Marxist feminist criticism of the Bible. Bible in the Modern World. Sheffield: Sheffield Phoenix Press. ISBN 978-1-906055-35-6.
- — (2009). Criticism of religion: on Marxism and theology, II. Historical Materialism Book Series. Vol. 22. Leiden; Boston: Brill. ISBN 978-90-04-17646-1. OCLC 317573556.
- — (2009). Political grace: the revolutionary theology of John Calvin (1st ed.). Louisville, Ky.: Westminster John Knox Press. ISBN 978-0-664-23393-8. OCLC 300279962.
- — (2009). Political myth: on the use and abuse of Biblical themes. New Slant. Durham: Duke University Press. ISBN 978-0-8223-4335-6. OCLC 255016937.
- — (2011). Criticism of theology: on Marxism and theology, III. Historical Materialism Book Series. Vol. 27. Leiden; Boston: Brill Publishers. ISBN 978-90-04-18974-4. OCLC 727950316.
- — (2012). Criticism of earth: on Marx, Engels, and theology, IV. Historical Materialism Book Series. Vol. 35. Leiden: Brill Publishers. ISBN 9789004225589. OCLC 796383691.
- — (2012). Nick Cave: a study of love, death, and apocalypse. Studies in Popular Music. Sheffield: Equinox Publishing. ISBN 9781908049674. OCLC 730414507.
- — (2013). Lenin, religion, and theology. New Approaches to Religion and Power (1st ed.). New York, NY: Palgrave Macmillan. ISBN 978-1-137-32389-7. OCLC 822532801.
- —; Petterson, Christina (2014). Idols of nations: biblical myth at the origins of capitalism. Minneapolis: 1517 Media. ISBN 978-1-4514-6544-0. OCLC 866619973.
- — (2014). In the vale of tears: on Marxism and theology, V. Historical Materialism Book Series. Vol. 52. Leiden: Brill Publishers. ISBN 978-90-04-25232-5. OCLC 862050346.
- — (2014). Secularism and biblical studies. BibleWorld. London: Routledge. ISBN 9781315478531. OCLC 980282933.
- — (2014). Symposia: dialogues concerning the history of biblical interpretation. BibleWorld. London: Routledge. ISBN 9781315711225. OCLC 958109369.
- — (2015). Marxist criticism of the Hebrew Bible (2nd ed.). London: T&T Clark. ISBN 978-0-567-12870-6. OCLC 896822487.
- — (2015). The sacred economy of ancient Israel. Library of ancient Israel. Louisville, Ky.: Westminster John Knox Press. ISBN 978-1-61164-555-2. OCLC 909903384.
- — (2017). Stalin: From Theology to the Philosophy of Socialism in Power. Singapore: Springer. doi:10.1007/978-981-10-6367-1. ISBN 978-981-10-6367-1.
- —; Petterson, Christina (2017). Time of troubles: a new economic framework for early Christianity. Minneapolis: 1517 Media. ISBN 978-1-5064-0631-2. OCLC 966572632.
- — (2021). Friedrich Engels and the Foundations of Socialist Governance. SpringerBriefs in Philosophy. Singapore: Springer. doi:10.1007/978-981-16-4695-9. ISBN 978-981-16-4694-2. OCLC 1275357049.
- — (2021). Socialism with Chinese Characteristics: A Guide for Foreigners. Singapore: Springer. doi:10.1007/978-981-16-1622-8. ISBN 978-981-16-1622-8. OCLC 1249470522.
- — (2023). Socialism in Power: On the History and Theory of Socialist Governance. Singapore: Springer. doi:10.1007/978-981-19-5414-6. ISBN 978-981-19-5413-9. OCLC 1372399583.

=== Book chapters ===
- — (2003). "Sanctuary and womb: Henri Lefebvre and the production of ancient space". In —; Conrad, Edgar W. (eds.). Redirected travel: alternative journeys and places in biblical studies. Journal for the Study of the Old Testament. London; New York: T&T Clark. pp. 162–184. ISBN 978-0-8264-6766-9. OCLC 276838400.
- — (2012). "The Anomaly of Interpretation; A Web of Fascination: Marxism and The Bible". In Conrad, Edgar W.; Carden, Michael; Kelso, Julie; — (eds.). The one who reads may run: essays in honour of Edgar W. Conrad. Library of Hebrew Bible/Old Testament studies. New York, NY: T&T Clark. ISBN 978-0-567-60217-6. OCLC 761380392.
- — (2020). "Lenin and Non-Antagonistic Contradictions". In Joffre-Eichhorn, Hjalmar Jorge; Anderson, Patrick (eds.). Lenin 150. Hamburg: Kick Ass books. pp. 79–88. ISBN 978-3-00-066212-6.
- — (2020). "The State and Minority Nationalities (Ethnic Groups) in China". In Ratuva, Steven (ed.). The Palgrave Handbook of Ethnicity. Singapore: Palgrave Macmillan. pp. 93–107. ISBN 978-981-13-2899-2.
- — (2023). "The Philosophical Economist: The Contribution of Cheng Enfu". Innovative Marxist School in China: Comments by International Scholars on Cheng Enfu's Academic Thoughts. Berlin, Germany: Canut International Publishers. pp. 367–390. ISBN 978-605-4923-74-8.

=== Articles ===
- —; Chin, Kenpa (24 June 2016). "Chinese Christian communism in the early twentieth century". Religion, State and Society. 44 (2): 96–110. doi:10.1080/09637494.2016.1169752. ISSN 0963-7494.
- — (31 March 2016). "Concerning the "Warm Stream" within Marxism". International Critical Thought. 6 (1): 13–28. doi:10.1080/21598282.2016.1142384. ISSN 2159-8282.
- — (10 October 2017). "After October: Towards a Theory of the Socialist State". International Critical Thought. 7 (3): 309–326. doi:10.1080/21598282.2017.1355742. ISSN 2159-8282.
- — (4 April 2019). "Marx's Ambivalence: State, Proletarian Dictatorship and Commune". International Critical Thought. 9 (1): 109–127. doi:10.1080/21598282.2019.1585603. ISSN 2159-8282.
- — (January 2020). "Seeking a Xiaokang Society: Deng Xiaoping and the Reinterpretation of the Confucian Tradition in Chinese Marxism" (PDF). Berlin Journal of Critical Theory. 4 (1): 181–210.
- —; Yan, Ping (7 May 2021). ""Not Some Other -ism"—On Some Western Marxist Misrepresentations of Chinese Socialism". International Critical Thought. 11 (2): 171–189. doi:10.1080/21598282.2021.1923171. ISSN 2159-8282.
- — (12 May 2021). "Socialism and the Market: Returning to the East European Debate". New Political Economy. 28 (1): 1–12. doi:10.1080/13563467.2021.1926958. ISSN 1356-3467.
- — (January 2023). "Inner Transcendence and "Beyond": The Debate in Chinese Philosophy" (PDF). Berlin Journal of Critical Theory. 7 (1): 83–102. eISSN 2567-4056. ISSN 2567-4048.
- — (24 February 2023). "A Truncated Marxism: On the Ideological Structure of Western Marxism". Fudan Journal of the Humanities and Social Sciences. 16 (2): 145–170. doi:10.1007/s40647-023-00366-0. ISSN 1674-0750.
- — (March 2023). "The End of Western Marxism? On the Unravelling of an Ideological Structure". Fudan Journal of the Humanities and Social Sciences. 16 (2): 123–143. doi:10.1007/s40647-023-00369-x. ISSN 1674-0750.
- — (31 December 2023). "Abstract or Concrete Utopia? Concerning the Ideal Society in Chinese Philosophy and Culture". Religions. 15 (1): 55. doi:10.3390/rel15010055. ISSN 2077-1444.
- — (20 April 2024). "A New Socioeconomic Formation? Philosophical Reflections on China's "New Projectment Economy"". World Marxist Review. 1 (1): 77–98. doi:10.62834/rdgm2d20. ISSN 3023-672X.
