= The End of the World Is Just the Beginning =

2022 book by Peter Zeihan

The End of the World Is Just the Beginning: Mapping the Collapse of Globalization
- Author: Peter Zeihan
- Language: English
- Subject: Geography, demography, economics, geopolitics, transport, finance, energy, industrial materials, manufacturing, agriculture, climate change
- Genre: Nonfiction
- Publisher: Harper Business
- Publication date: June 14, 2022
- Publication place: United States
- Pages: 481
- ISBN: 978-0-063-23047-7

The End of the World Is Just the Beginning: Mapping the Collapse of Globalization is a nonfiction book written by Peter Zeihan, a geopolitical strategist who formerly worked for the geopolitical intelligence firm Stratfor. The book was published by Harper Business in June 2022.

== Summary ==
The book analyzes the elements that lead different nations to succeed or fail, in the author's opinion, focusing on demographic, geographic, and historic factors. It asserts that the period from the 1950s to the 2020s represented a peak period of rapid economic development and innovation; meanwhile, the present (2022) and future would be associated with a rather abrupt slowing of such developments. In this view, deglobalization leads to deindustrialization, deurbanization, and depopulation.

== Reception ==
The book debuted at number 12 on The New York Times nonfiction best-seller list for the week ending June 18, 2022.

Kirkus Reviews acknowledged the book's points, but regarded its forecast as excessively pessimistic:

Zeihan is enthusiastic in his writing, and he covers a great deal of territory, some of it in superficial or questionable fashion. Are countries really going to develop their own pirate fleets to seize supply ships? Will the U.S. establish a quasi-empire of the Americas, using food as a weapon of intimidation? Is China facing collapse within a decade? Predictions of world-ending resource depletion and geopolitical disaster have been made before... The Club of Rome and Paul Ehrlich were saying it in the 1970s, and their fears turned out to be misplaced... The book has entertainment value, but some of the material should be taken with many grains of salt.

An early analysis of the book by Liam Denning, from Bloomberg, published in The Washington Post was positive.
