= The Coming Conflict with China =

1997 strategic foresight book

The Coming Conflict With China
- Front cover of the 1997 edition of the book
- Author: Richard Bernstein; Ross H. Munro
- Language: English
- Subject: China
- Genre: Strategic foresight
- Publisher: Knopf Publishing Group
- Publication date: 1997
- Publication place: United States
- ISBN: 978-0-679-45463-2

The Coming Conflict With China is a 1997 book by Richard Bernstein and Ross H. Munro. The book argued that conflict between the United States and the People's Republic of China would dominate the early decades of the 21st century and advocated various steps to counter what the authors saw as the Chinese threat to the US.

== Development ==
Richard Bernstein originally started talking about his ideas for the book in 1996. At the time Bernstein was working as a book critic for the New York Times, though he had previously been the Time magazine bureau chief in Beijing. Bernstein had called up Munro to discuss his ideas for the book, and ended up deciding to collaborate on the writing of the book. Munro, a friend of Bernstein's, was the former Toronto Globe and Mail correspondent in Beijing, and had been expelled from China in 1978 for writing about human rights, after which he had worked for Time in Hong Kong. The text of the book was written by Bernstein from beginning to end so as to maintain a consistent writing style, with Munro contributing factual content for inclusion in it.

== Summary ==
The book opens with a quotation from Chinese general Mi Zhenyu quoting him as saying: "[As for the United States] for a relatively long time it will be absolutely necessary that we quietly nurse our sense of vengeance . . . We must conceal our abilities and bide our time".

Bernstein and Munro argue in the book, based on a 1994 declaration that the Chinese Communist Party regards the US as a "hegemonist power", that the Chinese government sees the US as an enemy power and wishes to supplant it in Asia. Whilst Bernstein and Munro characterised China as not ideologically communist, or expansionist per se, they also stated that China's rulers wished to establish a hegemony of their own and to obtain US military technologies to strengthen themselves, and also sought to support opponents of the US globally. The authors describe China as an "unsatisfied and ambitious power whose goal is to dominate Asia". Additionally Bernstein and Munro expressed the view that China's rulers blamed the US for the actions of the student demonstrators prior to the Tiananmen square massacre.

The authors expressed the view that a war between the US and China was possible, with Taiwan being the most likely "flashpoint". The book includes a chapter describing a potential future conflict over Taiwan in which China attempts military conquest of the island. Bernstein and Munro predicted that "within the next decade or two, China will become the second-most-powerful military power on Earth, with economic power to match".

Bernstein and Munro heavily criticised the policies of the administration of Bill Clinton towards China, criticising especially Clinton's failure to strip China of its most favoured nation (MFN) status having promised to do so if human rights in China did not improve during the 1992 presidential election campaign. Bernstein and Munro described this as "one of the most complete turnabouts in recent American diplomatic history". The authors also stated that the threat to link MFN status to human rights had been "a bad idea in the first place". The authors did, however, positively assess the Clinton administration's handling of the 1996 Taiwan Straits crisis.

Regarding Japan, the authors advocated that the US should stop opposing Japanese rearmament, and instead characterised a weak Japan as a potential danger for the US. The authors saw the Chinese' government's goal as being to reduce Japan to a pacifist, neutralised, and subordinate status, whilst fostering anti-Japanese sentiment domestically. The authors opposed China being allowed to join the World Trade Organisation as a developing nation.

== Reception ==
Publishers Weekly Magazine described the book as "farsighted, chilling" and praised the book as a "hard-hitting critique" and a "wake-up call". Donald Zagoria, writing in the May/June 1997 edition of Foreign Policy, described the book as "pessimistic" and criticised it for "overlook[ing] the common interests that both the United States and China have in maintaining regional peace in Asia". Paul Kengor reviewing the book in the Summer 1998 issue of Presidential Studies Quarterly praised it for "provid[ing] a well-documented contribution to our understanding of how President Clinton handled one of the most critical, nettlesome issues facing U.S. foreign policy in the 1990's". Harry S. Rowen reviewing the book in the Summer 1997 issue of The National Interest criticised what he saw as the "primitive" economic analysis deployed by Bernstein and Munro in the book, and also regard what he saw as the book's failure to sufficiently take account of Chinese democratisation and increasing internet freedom as a "crucial omission".

Steven Goldstein writing in the Fall 1997 issue of Harvard International Review condemned the book as a "polemic" and even "a parody of a polemic, doing little to advance either debate or understanding".

== Legacy ==
In 1998 the book was described by Daniel Burstein in Big Dragon: The Future of China as having become "the bible of the China Threat school". Munro lost his position as director of the Asia program at the Philadelphia Foreign Policy Research Institute (FPRI) subsequent to publication of the book. According to The Weekly Standard, this was due to pressure from the China Lobby, and particularly Alexander Haig, who was a trustee of FPRI and had "hated" the book.

== See also ==
- The Coming War With Japan
- The Coming Collapse of China
