= Richard Bernstein (journalist) =

American journalist (1944–2025)

- Born: May 5, 1944; New York City, U.S.
- Died: March 31, 2025 (aged 80); New York City, U.S.
- Education: University of Connecticut (BA); Harvard University (MA); National Taiwan Normal University
- Occupations: Journalist; columnist; author
- Employers: International Herald Tribune; The New York Times; Time
- Spouse: Zhongmei Li
- Children: 1
- Website: Random House

Richard Paul Bernstein (May 5, 1944 – March 31, 2025) was an American journalist, columnist and author. He wrote the Letter from America column for the International Herald Tribune. He was a book critic at The New York Times and a foreign correspondent for both Time magazine and The New York Times in Europe and Asia.

== Early life and education ==
Richard Paul Bernstein was born in New York City on May 5, 1944, but grew up on a poultry farm in East Haddam, Connecticut. After graduating from Nathan Hale-Ray High School, he earned a B.A. in history from the University of Connecticut and an M.A. in History and East Asian Languages from Harvard University. In 1971, he moved to Taiwan to study Chinese at National Taiwan Normal University.

== Career ==
In 1973, Bernstein joined the staff of Time magazine tasked with writing about Asia. In 1979, he opened the magazine's first bureau in the People's Republic of China and served as the first Beijing bureau chief. In 1982, he accepted a position with The New York Times where he served as the United Nations Bureau Chief, Paris Bureau Chief, National Cultural Correspondent, book critic, and Berlin Bureau Chief.

== Published works ==
External videos
- Discussion with Bernstein and Ross Munro on The Coming Conflict with China, February 21, 1997, C-SPAN
- Booknotes interview with Bernstein on The Coming Conflict with China, May 11, 1997, C-SPAN
- Presentation by Bernstein on Dictatorship of Virtue, October 30, 1997, C-SPAN
- Presentation by Bernstein on Ultimate Journey, March 27, 2001, C-SPAN
- Presentation by Bernstein on China 1945, November 14, 2014, C-SPAN

Bernstein's first book, From the Center of the Earth: The Search for the Truth About China (1982), was named one of the "Notable Books of the Year 1982" by The New York Times and solidified his reputation as a China expert. The Coming Conflict with China (1997) was chosen as one of The New York Times "Notable Books of the Year 1997."

Bibliography

- From the Center of the Earth: The Search for the Truth About China (1982)
- Fragile Glory: A Portrait of France and the French (1990)
- Dictatorship of Virtue: Multiculturalism and the Battle for America's Future (1994)
- The Coming Conflict with China (1997), with Ross. H. Munro
- Ultimate Journey: Retracing the Path of an Ancient Buddhist Monk Who Crossed Asia in Search of Enlightenment (2001)
- Out of the Blue: The Story of September 11, 2001, from Jihad to Ground Zero (2002)
- The East, the West, and Sex: A History of Erotic Encounters (2009)
- A Girl Named Faithful Plum: The Story of a Dancer from China and How She Achieved Her Dream (2012)
- China 1945 (2014)
- Only in America: Al Jolson and the Jazz Singer (2024)

== Personal life and death ==
Bernstein lived in the Park Slope neighborhood of Brooklyn, New York City. His wife was Zhongmei Li, a Chinese classical dancer who worked with Jia Zhoungli and whom he met at a New York film screening. She attended the Beijing Dance Academy for 7 years (1978–1984) and founded the New York-based Zhongmei Dance Company in 1992. They had a son.

Bernstein died from pancreatic cancer at a hospital in Manhattan, on March 31, 2025, at the age of 80.
