= Fred Burton (security expert) =

American security expert

Fred Burton is geopolitical intelligence platform Stratfor's chief security officer and a New York Times bestselling author.

== Early life ==
Burton was born January 2, 1958, in Beckley, West Virginia, United States. He attended high school in Bethesda, Maryland, and became a volunteer with the Bethesda-Chevy Chase Rescue Squad at age 18, in 1975. He remains a Life Member of the organization, which bills itself as the world's largest volunteer rescue squad. His volunteer activities are briefly referenced in his first book, "Ghost: Confessions of a Counterterrorism Agent."

Some of the events in his early life are recounted in the 2011 book Chasing Shadows: A Special Agent's Lifelong Hunt to Bring a Cold War Assassin to Justice. Burton has said he was deeply impacted by the murder in 1973 of a neighbor, Joe Alon, who was later discovered to have been an Israeli intelligence operative.

== Career ==
Burton began his career in law enforcement as a police officer in Montgomery County, Maryland and later worked for the U.S. Secret Service. From 1985 to 1999, he was a special agent with the U.S. Diplomatic Security Service (DSS). He eventually became the deputy chief of the DSS counterterrorism division.

While with the DSS, Burton was appointed by Washington to assist in the investigation of the assassination of Israeli Prime Minister Yitzhak Rabin. He also investigated the killing of Rabbi Meir Kahane; the al Qaeda New York City bombing plots before the September 11 attacks; and the Libyan-backed terrorist attacks against diplomats in Sana'a and Khartoum. He was involved in the arrest of Ramzi Yousef, the mastermind of the first World Trade Center bombing in 1993.

Burton joined Stratfor, an Austin, Texas-based geopolitical forecasting and analysis company, in 2004. Reflections on his experiences as a counterterrorism agent are recorded in his series, Lessons From Old Case Files.

== Books ==
Burton is the author of a memoir, Ghost: Confessions of a Counterterrorism Agent, published by Random House in 2008, and Chasing Shadows: A Special Agent's Lifelong Hunt to Bring a Cold War Assassin to Justice, published by Palgrave Macmillan in 2011.

Under Fire: The Untold Story of the Attack in Benghazi, written by Burton and Samuel M. Katz, was published by St. Martin's Press in September 2013 and was a New York Times bestseller. [Vanity Fair] ran a lengthy excerpt from the book shortly before it was published. HBO has purchased the film rights to the book, with executive producer Jerry Weintraub to oversee production.

In addition to his own memoirs, Burton has been referenced or portrayed in other books, including 1000 Years for Revenge: International Terrorism and the FBI—Untold Story by former ABC News correspondent Peter Lance and a commemorative book of photos published by the Department of State Diplomatic Security Service, 25 Years in Pictures.

Burton's involvement in the search for and capture of Ramzi Yousef was chronicled in Relentless Pursuit: The DSS and the Manhunt for the Al-Qaeda Terrorists by Sam Katz (Forge, 2002). The acquaintance that was formed as Katz was writing this book led to his collaboration with Burton more than a decade later on Under Fire.

Burton's latest book, Beirut Rules, is co-written with Samuel Katz and will be released by Penguin Random House h in October 2018. The book chronicles the abduction, torture and murder of CIA Station Chief William Buckley by Hezbollah in the early 1980s. After reading Beirut Rules, former President George H. W. Bush said: “In these pages, Fred Burton and Samuel Katz ably describe the selfless service and ultimate sacrifice of CIA’s William F. Buckley, murdered brutally while held as a hostage in Lebanon. Beirut Rules can’t bring this quiet hero back to life. But it will show a new generation the value of a life well lived in service of country.”

== Film and TV appearances ==
In May 2008, Burton was interviewed on Comedy Central's The Daily Show by host Jon Stewart. He regularly speaks with national and international media on counterterrorism, law enforcement and other security related matters, including the October 2017 mass shooting in Las Vegas, Nevada.

In July 2016, Burton sat down with Yahoo Finance Editor-in-Chief Andy Serwer to discuss how corporate executives are responding to recent international terrorist attacks. In November 2016, Burton was featured in a Washington Post story on the potential threats to Trump-branded properties around the world after the election of Donald Trump as President of the United States.
