= Historical nihilism =

Chinese political term

- Simplified Chinese: 历史虚无主义
Transcriptions
Standard Mandarin
- Hanyu Pinyin: Lìshǐ xūwú zhǔyì

Historical nihilism is a term used by the Chinese Communist Party (CCP) and some scholars in China to describe research, discussions, or viewpoints judged to contradict government-sanctioned interpretations of history. This may include analyses critical of the People's Liberation Army, socialism, and official CCP narratives regarding historical topics such as the Opium Wars, Boxer Rebellion, Japanese war crimes and character of the Qing dynasty. The CCP has defined historical nihilism as citing only certain events without consideration of the whole in order to criticize historical figures or entities. Viewpoints considered to be historical nihilism are subject to censorship and those expressing them can be prosecuted.

== Background ==
In a January 2013 speech, CCP general secretary Xi Jinping described "hostile forces" as using historical nihilism to weaken the party's rule by smearing its history. In early 2021, Xi increased efforts to promote a "correct outlook on history" ahead of the 100th Anniversary of the Chinese Communist Party, including opening a telephone hotline and website for citizens to report people who engage in acts of historical nihilism.

Historical nihilism has been defined in CCP publications as criticism of the entirety of an entity (such as the CCP, its national heroes, leaders, socialism and its official history) by citing only certain events without consideration of the whole. Neither Mao Zedong nor Deng Xiaoping used the term historical nihilism. According to Chinese historian Zhang Lifan, the main push to fight against 'historical nihilism', according to its specific modern meaning, undertaken by the CCP has its origin following the 1989 Tiananmen Square protests and massacre and coinciding events within the Eastern Bloc. In December of that year, Jiang Zemin made a speech in which he said that bourgeois liberalization had led to the spread of 'national nihilism' and 'historical nihilism', which had entered party thinking and brought about confusion.

Historical nihilism is one of "The Seven Noteworthy Problems" discussed in the 2012 Communiqué on the Current State of the Ideological Sphere (Document No. 9). It states that the main expressions of historical nihilism are:

Rejecting the revolution; claiming that the revolution led by the Chinese Communist Party resulted only in destruction; denying the historical inevitability in China's choice of the Socialist road, calling it the wrong path, and the Party's and new China's history a "continuous series of mistakes"; rejecting the accepted conclusions on historical events and figures, disparaging our Revolutionary precursors, and vilifying the Party's leaders. Recently, some people took advantage of Comrade Mao Zedong's 120th birthday in order to deny the scientific and guiding value of Mao Zedong thought. Some people try to cleave apart the period that preceded Reform and Opening from the period that followed, or even to set these two periods in opposition to one another. By rejecting CCP history and the history of New China, historical nihilism seeks to fundamentally undermine the CCP's historical purpose, which is tantamount to denying the legitimacy of the CCP's long-term political dominance.

In 2013, Xi introduced the idea of the "Two Undeniables", which he described as "we must not use the period of history after reform and opening to deny the period of history prior to reform and opening" and we "must not use the period of history before reform and opening to deny the period of history after reform and opening". This view is sometimes expressed as the motto, "the two thirty years should not negate each other".

== Government uses of the term ==
Media and education in China must comply with state censorship in the presentation of history. In 2018, the Law on the Protection of Heroes and Martyrs criminalized speech deemed slander of "heroes and martyrs". The Patriotic Education Law of the People's Republic of China also aimed to combat historical nihilism. The Chinese Academy of Social Sciences established a specialized unit to propagate an official version of history. In 2019, the People's Daily, the official newspaper of the Central Committee of the Chinese Communist Party, accused New Qing History of "bringing foreign historical nihilism as a theoretical variant into Qing historical research in China." Revisionist views regarding the Opium Wars and the Boxer Rebellion are among those described as historical nihilism, together with downplaying of atrocities committed by Japanese forces during the Second Sino-Japanese War and colonisation of Taiwan.

The Great Chinese Famine, the Cultural Revolution and 1989 Tiananmen Square protests and massacre are often scrubbed or at least depicted in such a way as to avoid blame on the party. For example, films criticizing Cultural Revolution hardliners were prevalent from the late 1970s to the early 1980s, although they were later banned as historical nihilism.

In May 2021, the Cyberspace Administration of China confirmed it had deleted over 2 million posts for historical nihilism. In 2022, Chinese social media platforms Douban, Douyin, Toutiao and Weibo all announced campaigns against content deemed to be historical nihilism. Weibo allows users to report certain content on the platform, including historical nihilism.

In 2023, a previously official history textbook about the Mongols in China was banned for historical nihilism. Modern Chinese history is generally presented to praise the achievements of the CCP and its role in creating a prosperous 'new China'.

When Xi Jinping became CCP general secretary and paramount leader in January 2013, he made a speech in which he said, 'The history of the post-reform period cannot be used to contradict the history of the pre-reform period, and the history of the pre-reform period cannot be used to contradict the history of the post-reform period'. Although China's reforms since the 1980s caused it to radically change and abandon many of the Marxist policies that had existed under Mao Zedong, the official state-sanctioned version of history under Xi Jinping teaches an interpretation of continuity, praising both the contributions made by the CCP of Mao's generation and the CCP of the post-reform period. This is in contrast to interpretations in the period prior to Xi Jinping whereby some of Mao's policies could receive heavy criticism and the official stance of the party was a rejection of the Cultural Revolution, which had been referred to as the 'Ten Year Calamity' (十年浩劫).

In 2025, the Study Times of the CCP's Central Party School stated that historical nihilism had become "subtle and covert" in an era of artificial intelligence. The same year, the Zhejiang Provincial Committee of the Chinese Communist Party and Xinhua News Agency denounced the 1644 historical view as historical nihilism. In 2026, The Paper labeled an online conspiracy theory claiming that the Tang dynasty never existed as historical nihilism.

=== Collapse of the Soviet Union ===
In a 2013 speech, Xi Jinping described historical nihilism as contributing to the collapse of the Soviet Union:

Why did the Soviet Union disintegrate? Why did the Communist Party of the Soviet Union fall to pieces? An important reason is that in the ideological domain, competition is fierce! To completely repudiate the historical experience of the Soviet Union, to repudiate the history of the CPSU, to repudiate Lenin, to repudiate Stalin was to wreck chaos in Soviet ideology and engage in historical nihilism. It caused Party organizations at all levels to have barely any function whatsoever. It robbed the Party of its leadership of the military. In the end the CPSU—as great a Party as it was—scattered like a flock of frightened beasts! The Soviet Union—as great a country as it was—shattered into a dozen pieces. This is a lesson from the past!

— Xi Jinping, Uphold and Develop Socialism with Chinese Characteristics

In February 2022, the CCP published the documentary Historical Nihilism and the Disintegration of the Soviet Union. The documentary contends that Nikita Khruschev "lit the fire of nihilism" by criticizing predecessor Joseph Stalin in his On the Cult of Personality and Its Consequences speech.

Ji Zhengju described the lesson that the CCP draws from historical nihilism in the Soviet Union as "weakening and abandonment of Party guidance in the ideological field serves the schemes of western powers to divide, westernize, and vilify the system, and leads to the proliferation of all kinds of erroneous thought tides." CCP leadership expresses concerns about historical nihilism in the context of the Soviet Union's experience with the refrain, "[t]he Soviets won the October Revolution with only a few hundred thousand members; it defeated the Nazis with a few million; but when it had tens of millions of members, it suffered a tragic collapse."

=== Academic analysis ===
Academic Jean Christopher Mittelstaedt stated that prior to 2013, the Chinese government's use of historical nihilism was used primarily to "stigmatize heterodox scholarship." After 2013, historical nihilism was "recast as an existential threat" to the party-state. Academics Jian Xu, Qian Gong, and Wen Yin write that the CCP's attention to historical nihilism "has gained momentum in the 21st century due to the rise of market-oriented cultural production in post-socialist China as well as the development of new media technologies." They cite the TV drama adaptation of "Red Classics" as "a pertinent example of historical nihilism caused by market orientation in cultural production," explaining:

To produce 'selling points' and increase audience ratings, some of the original works have been greatly revised for more dramatic tension, especially the stories and images of some high-profile revolutionary heroes and CCP leaders. To curb the trend, the State Administration of Radio, Film and Television (SARAFT) issued a notice in 2004, stipulating that all Red Classics TV dramas had to be submitted to the Censorship Committee of SARAFT for final approval after passing the initial censorship at the provincial level.

== Other uses of the term ==
According to Suisheng Zhao, some contemporary mainland Chinese scholars contend that Western scholars who describe the Qing dynasty as expansionist of engaging in historical nihilism. In the view of these scholars, some Westerner scholars attempt to emphasize aggressive aspects of the Qing in order to demonstrate that modern China is inevitably aggressive.

Academic Roland Boer defines several genres of China-related narratives as historical nihilism, citing the "China doomer" narrative exemplified by Gordan G. Chang's The Coming Collapse of China, anti-communist tropes, atrocity propaganda, and "betrayal" narratives in which Deng Xiaoping is cast as bringing capitalism to China.

== See also ==
- Ideology of the Chinese Communist Party
- Censorship in China
- Four Confidences
- Two Cannot be Denied
