= The Coming War with Japan =

1991 strategic foresight book

- Front cover of the 1991 edition
- Author: George Friedman; Meredith LeBard
- Language: English
- Subject: United States–Japan relations
- Publisher: St. Martin's Press
- Publication date: May 1, 1991
- Publication place: United States
- ISBN: 0-312-07677-0

The Coming War with Japan is a book by geopolitical analyst George Friedman and Meredith LeBard, published in 1991, in which they argue that another conflict between the United States and Japan was inevitable as the latter was becoming an economic threat to the former. The Japanese title of the book translates as The Coming War with Japan: A 'Second Pacific War' is inevitable (ザ・カミング・ウォー・ウィズ・ジャパン: 「第二次太平洋戦争」は不可避だ, za kamingu uoo whizu japan: "dai ni ji Taiheiyōsensō" wa fukahi da).

Friedman and LeBard's prediction of a shooting war between the US and Japan within two decades did not come true, and Japan's economy eventually stagnated due to the asset price bubble. The book was commercially successful, particularly amongst the Japanese, but was also negatively reviewed critically. Retrospective analysis of the book has discussed it in terms of negative U.S. attitudes towards Japan or other countries in general that challenge the U.S. economically.

== Development ==
Friedman and LeBard wrote the book when they were both teaching in Harrisburg, Pennsylvania – Friedman at Dickinson College where he taught political science and LeBard at Harrisburg Area Community College where she taught writing classes. Friedman came up with the idea in 1989, and brought in LeBard as a co-author to make the book more readable. Neither Friedman nor LeBard had ever been to Japan at the time the book was written. Release of the book was announced in June 1990 under the working title The Second U.S.-Japanese War, with Friedman stating that the book would set out the case that there was "a good chance of a major U.S.-Japanese conflict within the next 20 years, including the possibility of an armed conflict".

The book was initially released in the US on May 1, 1991. The book was also translated into Japanese and released in Japan on May 21, 1991. The Japanese edition was translated from English by Sachi Kogabayashi and published by Tokuma Shoten.

== Summary ==
Friedman and LeBard argue in the book that, with the USSR in a state of collapse and with the Cold War coming to a close at the time, the United States was more likely to come into conflict with Japan as the US no longer had sufficient reason to tolerate what the authors believed to be Japanese economic encroachment. Friedman and LeBard predicted that a series of trade wars between the US and Japan would lead to a final rupture between the two countries. The authors also expressed the view that, as with Imperial Japan in the 1930s and 1940s, Japan would seek to take control of sources of raw materials and force the US out of the western Pacific. The authors saw the only alternative to a hot war between the US and Japan as being a "long, miserable cold war".

The authors also made predictions about Europe, predicting that by 1992 European integration would lead to the US being "pushed out of" markets in Europe and the USSR. Friedman and LeBard further predicted that this would lead to isolationism and "Japan-bashing" being adopted by candidates in the 1992 US presidential elections, leading to a drive to exclude Japanese imports from the US market.

Friedman and LeBard believed that the Japanese armed forces could be expanded rapidly into "a world-class military force". They also considered that Article 9 of the Japanese Constitution was only a "legal fiction" and would not prevent Japanese rearmament or aggression. To meet this perceived threat, Friedman and LeBard proposed that the US Navy be kept at its 1991 size, and the US Marine Corps be doubled in size, with this being paid for by cuts to the US Army and strategic forces.

Friedman and LeBard expected that a conflict between Japan and America would unfold within "a generation" and that the world would "settle into a new cold war before a hot war threatens". They predicted that the casus belli would be the shutting off of supplies of raw materials to Japan by US action. A map accompanying the book portrayed the Asia-Pacific region as being divided into US and Japanese spheres of influence by the year 2000, with Indonesia, North Korea, Malaysia, Thailand, and Burma portrayed as Japanese allies, whilst Taiwan, Australia, Singapore, and South Korea were portrayed as being in the US sphere of influence, with other territories (including China, Vietnam, Mongolia, the Philippines, Laos, and Cambodia) being marked as "contested".

The original book jacket of the book stated that "conflict will escalate in the next two decades to include the possibility—indeed probability—of an armed conflict, a second US–Japanese war in the Pacific". Later editions replaced this statement with positive reviews.

== Reception ==
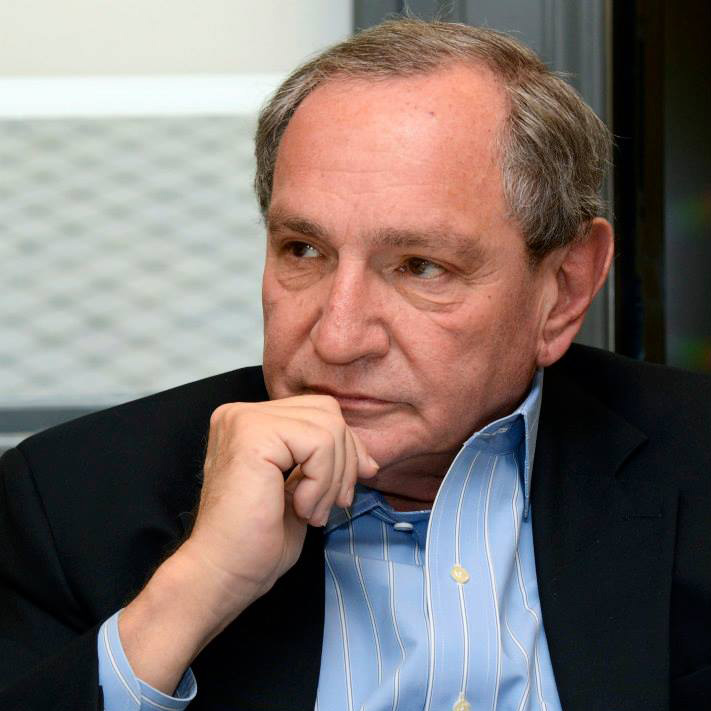
George Friedman in 2017

A review by James Fallows in the May 1991 issue of the New York Review was critical of the book, saying that it "does not come close to proving its announced case" and that "The Coming War is unconvincing, but it is not stupid", and predicting that "In twenty years the passages warning about submarine duels will, I think and hope, look bizarre". The book received a mixed review by Victor V. Fic in the September–October 1991 issue of the journal Challenge. Fic found the book "deserv[ed] respect for its courage and candour" but also that "Friedman and LeBard's prognostication about war is built upon a series of assumptions that are more like loose pebbles than solid bedrock". Fic also criticised the book for what he saw as placing the blame for Japan-US tension entirely on the US, though he also said that this "nullifies any accusation that their book is Japan-bashing". A review by Ray S. Cline in the Fall 1991 edition of Foreign Affairs summarised the book as "one-sided, sensational".

A July 1991 review in the Financial Times of Canada by Neil Boyd criticized the book as being based on "outmoded ideas", and as dismissing the idea that peace might be possible too easily. The Economist's July 1991 review called the authors "alarmist" and accused them of "sensationalism", before expressing the view that US-Japan relations were much more intimate and complex than Friedman and LeBard had accounted for.

Haruo Shimada, a professor of economics at Keio University described the book as "very dangerous, because Americans who aren't well informed may believe it". A review in Bungei Shunjū by Shoichi Saeki stated that "Anyone with common sense is bound to laugh at predictions of a war between Japan and the United States". Jeff Kingston writing in the Japan Times accused the authors of "fanciful assumptions and simplified analysis", and stated that accepting the predictions of the book meant accepting "an implausible chain of events", and that for the Japanese to build a regional bloc as predicted in the book they would have to avoid being regarded as a threat. Kingston further criticised the book by stating that the authors "cavalierly dismiss the deep ties that bind the US and Japan" and by pointing out that the US was unlikely to impose broad sanctions against Japan due to the economic effect it would have in the US. Business Tokyo magazine described the book as "sensationalist pap".

A review by Lieutenant Colonel Gary Anderson of the US Marine Corps in the Spring 1992 issue of Naval War College Review described the book as presenting a "thought-provoking argument that critics should not ignore", though he also stated that they did not believe that the conflict predicted by Friedman and LeBard was inevitable. Jeb Stewart, an analyst at the US Army Engineer School, was less positive about the book in his review of it in the November 1992 issue of Engineer, describing it as "contain[ing] some flaws in logic", particularly because of what he saw as its failure to fully account for the role of relations between China and Japan, and the large investment in ballistic missile defences that Stewart believed Japan would need in such a conflict.

The US edition sold 40,000 copies in its first nine months. The Japanese edition sold 60,000 copies in its first three weeks. By February 1992 the Japanese edition had reportedly sold 350,000–400,000 copies. A docudrama based on the book aired on Japanese television on December 7, 1991.

== Legacy ==
In March 1994 Friedman and LeBard wrote that the end of the Japanese boom, the formation of NAFTA, and what they characterised as the collapse of the Japanese Liberal Democratic Party showed that their predictions were coming true, and warned that the US would soon stop tolerating the US trade deficit with Japan and that this would "set the stage for the next act, which will go far beyond the conflicts of trade". Friedman and LeBard, who are married, went on to write The Future of War: Power, Technology and American World Dominance in the Twenty-First Century and The Intelligence Edge: How to Profit in the Information Age together. Friedman has gone on to author further predictive works, including the 2009 book The Next 100 Years: A Forecast for the 21st Century and the 2011 book The Next Decade: Where We’ve Been . . . and Where We’re Going. In the former book, Friedman again predicts a war between the United States and Japan, this time occurring in the 2050s. At least one reviewer noted that the failure of Friedman's earlier predictions had not, apparently, given him pause when predicting future conflicts.

Friedman and LeBard's predicted US-Japan conflict did not occur within the two-decade time-frame they originally forecast for it, and as of 2025 has not occurred. US views of Japan have become more favourable since 1991, with 84% of Americans surveyed by Gallup reporting having either a "very favourable" or "mostly favourable" view of Japan in February 2021, up from 48% in November 1991.

American public opinion of Japan, 1989–2021 ("Perceptions of Foreign Countries". Gallup.com. Gallup, Inc.).

Raw data

=== Controversy ===
Retrospective analysis of the book has discussed it in the light of the "Japan bashing" of the era in which it was written, and anti-Asian sentiment in the US more generally, and ranked it with other "revisionist" texts. In the 2005 book The Columbia Guide to Asian American History, Gary Y. Okihiro described the book, together with The Coming Conflict with China, as being based on the assumption that "Japan and China maintain deep-seated and persistent views of the United States as their rival and enemy, grounded in economic and political competition, but also in a Clash of Civilizations", though Okihiro also noted that Friedman and LeBard disclaimed the title of "Japan Bashing". In the 2013 book Japan-Bashing: Anti-Japanism Since the 1980s, Narrelle Morris compared the book to other warnings of impending conflict with Japan issued during the 1980s such as Henry Scott-Stokes's 1986 warning that the US could face a "suicidal" nuclear-armed Japan.

== See also ==
- The Coming Collapse of China
- Japan–United States relations
- Plaza Accord
- Anti-Japanese sentiment
