= George Friedman =

Hungarian-American geostrategist (born 1949)

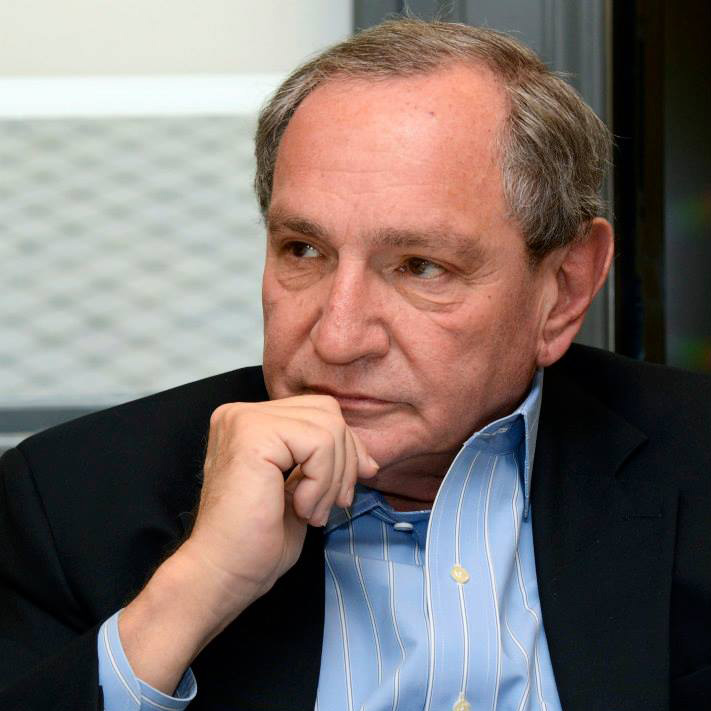
- Friedman in 2017
- Born: Friedman György; February 1, 1949 (age 77); Budapest, Hungary
- Occupation: Political scientist
- Known for: Founder and chairman of Geopolitical Futures (since 2015) and Stratfor (1996–2015)
- Spouse: Meredith Friedman (née LeBard)
- Children: 4

Academic background
- Education: City College of New York (BA); Cornell University (PhD)
- Thesis: The Political Philosophy of the Frankfurt School (1977)

Academic work
- Discipline: International relations Geopolitics
- Institutions: Dickinson College
- George Friedman's voice Recorded November 2022

George Friedman (born February 1, 1949) is a Hungarian-born American futurologist, political scientist, and writer. He is a geopolitical author on international relations. He is the founder and chairman of Geopolitical Futures. Before founding Geopolitical Futures, he was chairman of the publishing company Stratfor. He is best known for his 1991 book The Coming War With Japan, co-authored with his wife Meredith LeBard, which predicted a military conflict between the United States and Japan around 2020.

== Early life and education ==
Friedman was born in Budapest, Hungary, in 1949. His family immigrated to the United States. Friedman describes his family's story as "a very classic story of refugees making a new life in America." He grew up in New York City. Friedman received a B.A. at the City College of New York, where he majored in political science, and a Ph.D. in government at Cornell University.

== Career ==
After the collapse of the Soviet Union, Friedman studied the potential for a Japan-U.S. conflict and co-authored with his wife The Coming War with Japan in 1991. The war he predicted did not occur.

Friedman spent nearly 20 years in academia, during which time he taught political science at Dickinson College.

In 1996, Friedman founded Stratfor, a private intelligence and forecasting company, and served as the company's CEO and Chief Intelligence Officer. Stratfor's head office is in Austin, Texas. He resigned from Stratfor in May 2015. That year, he founded Geopolitical Futures.

Friedman's reputation as a forecaster of geopolitical events led The New York Times magazine to comment, in a profile, "There is a temptation, when you are around George Friedman, to treat him like a Magic 8 Ball".

=== Decade Forecasts at Stratfor ===
During his tenure at Stratfor, George Friedman oversaw the publication of the company's recurring Decade Forecasts, which aimed to predict long-term global trends based on structural factors such as geography, demography, and national interest.

1995–2005: The first forecast emphasized the continued supremacy of the United States in a unipolar world and projected a fragmented international system marked by tension and economic growth. Stratfor saw no credible rivals to U.S. power, predicting Japan would reemerge militarily and that Germany would be unable to lead European monetary integration. Neither of these occurred: Japan remained pacifist, and the euro was successfully launched. The report also failed to anticipate the rise of Islamist terrorism or the impact of 9/11, a major blind spot for a forecast released just a few years earlier.

China was predicted to disintegrate due to internal contradictions in its political and economic system. Instead, it experienced rapid growth and global integration. Stratfor also anticipated a reassertion of Russian power, though the country remained domestically focused until the early 2000s.

2000–2010: The second decade forecast portrayed the U.S. as the only actor capable of addressing global disequilibrium but failed to anticipate the war on terror's transformative role. It highlighted trends of coalition-building and de-synchronization in global economics, incorrectly suggesting that Asia, including China, would not recover during the decade. China was again seen as economically vulnerable and likely to ally with Russia to resist U.S. influence. The report also predicted the decline of the global economic system into regional blocs, which did not materialize in the form expected. Stratfor correctly anticipated Hugo Chávez's authoritarian turn in Venezuela but overstated the prospect of wider Latin American destabilization.

2005–2015: This forecast reiterated the view that the U.S. would maintain dominance due to its demographic advantages and immigration absorption, though it underestimated the political challenges that mass migration would later pose. Stratfor foresaw the decline of the European Union, predicting it would collapse by 2015. Although the EU faced significant institutional strain, including during the Eurozone crisis, it did not disband. Russia was expected to pursue a geopolitical reversal, including reabsorbing influence over former Soviet republics. While the prediction anticipated increasing Russian assertiveness, major developments like the 2008 war in Georgia and the lead-up to Crimea's annexation were not specifically forecast. On China, Stratfor doubled down on earlier warnings, asserting that growth was unsustainable and forecasting social fragmentation and economic decline. Contrary to these claims, China continued to grow and solidify its global position.

2010–2020: With terrorism seen as less of a global driver, Stratfor assessed that the U.S.–jihadist war was winding down just as the Islamic State was emerging. Russia was described as striving to consolidate its strategic buffers before demographic decline set in. In Europe, Stratfor anticipated populist backlash to immigration and cultural tensions between political elites and the broader public, a projection largely borne out by political developments in France, Germany, and Italy. For China, Stratfor expected an imminent economic crisis akin to Japan's post-bubble stagnation, citing debt, misallocated capital, and rising authoritarianism.

2015–2025: Stratfor projected increasing disorder in Europe and a return to nation-state politics, arguing that EU institutions would be too weak to address coming crises. It expected growing secessionist movements and economic divergence among member states. Russia was described as seeking to reintegrate parts of the former Soviet space to counter its demographic decline, though Stratfor did not specify which states might be targeted. The Middle East was expected to remain unstable due to continued political upheaval. Stratfor continued to forecast China's unraveling, citing mounting debt, political repression, and regional inequality. Although it admitted past predictions had been premature, it maintained that fragmentation of central authority was a possibility, however it now stated that an increasingly authoritarian/dictatorial rule was more likely.

=== The Next 100 Years (2009) ===
In The Next 100 Years, George Friedman presents a speculative forecast of global geopolitics throughout the 21st century, asserting that the United States will remain the dominant global power. He outlines a series of predicted geopolitical shifts, including a brief "Second Cold War" with Russia in the 2010s, followed by the eventual fragmentation of both Russia and China in the 2020s due to internal structural weaknesses.

Friedman predicts that China will face a severe internal crisis brought on by its rapid economic growth and resulting regional inequality. He argues that tensions between the prosperous coastal regions and the poorer interior will strain the political system. According to Friedman, "Either the government will crush dissent with an iron fist, or the country will begin to unravel." He concludes that national fragmentation is the more likely scenario, with provinces gaining autonomy as the central government loses effective control.

He anticipates the rise of new great powers—Turkey, Poland, and Japan—which, after initial alignment with the United States, will later challenge American supremacy. The book describes a hypothetical World War III around 2050, involving a Turkish-Japanese surprise attack against the U.S. and its allies, ultimately resulting in a U.S.-led victory and a post-war technological and economic boom.

The book also includes predictions on demographic changes, including mass immigration to the U.S., a later reversal of that trend due to automation, and a long-term U.S.–Mexico rivalry by century's end. Technological forecasts include space-based energy systems, powered exoskeletons for infantry, and lunar military bases.

Though intended as a theoretical projection, the book has drawn both interest and criticism for its bold assumptions and deterministic style. Stratfor, the geopolitical intelligence platform Friedman founded, later revised several of the book's forecasts—especially regarding the resilience of authoritarian governance in Russia and China.

=== The Next Decade (2010) ===
In The Next Decade, George Friedman argues that the United States, now the sole global superpower following the collapse of the Soviet Union in 1991, must move beyond denial of its imperial status and confront the burden of managing an international system shaped by its dominance. The decade ahead, he contends, will test whether the U.S. can preserve the institutions of its republican democracy while exercising global power—two forces he views as increasingly in tension. Friedman warns that America's post-Cold War pattern of reacting to crises with uncoordinated military interventions has destabilized the global order and weakened its own domestic institutions. Instead, he calls for a deliberate strategy of indirect influence, where the U.S. acts as a balancer among regional powers rather than a direct occupier or enforcer.

Regarding China, Friedman remains skeptical of its long-term cohesion and power. While acknowledging its economic rise, he argues that deep structural weaknesses—including vast regional disparities, heavy reliance on volatile export markets, and ethnic divisions—threaten its political stability. He predicts that rather than emerging as a unified global hegemon, China will face growing internal pressures that may force Beijing to loosen control or face resistance from powerful regional actors. Friedman suggests that the U.S. should respond not with confrontation, but by fostering regional counterweights like Japan and India.

Elsewhere, Friedman foresees Russia temporarily regaining influence in Eastern Europe before succumbing to demographic and economic decline. He highlights Turkey, Poland, and Japan as rising regional powers whose trajectories will shape the decade. Ultimately, Friedman stresses that U.S. leadership must blend moral vision with pragmatic realism, embracing complexity and abandoning ideological rigidity in order to sustain both its global role and domestic political health.

=== The Storm Before the Calm (2020) ===
The Storm Before the Calm: America's Discord, the Coming Crisis of the 2020s, and the Triumph Beyond, George Friedman presents a framework of two overlapping cycles in American history: a roughly 50-year socioeconomic cycle and an 80-year institutional cycle. According to Friedman, both cycles are converging in the 2020s, producing a period of deep internal disruption in the United States. He points to rising class conflict, cultural polarization, and the erosion of trust in expert-led governance as indicators of this upheaval. Drawing parallels to past moments of crisis—such as the Civil War, the Great Depression, and the 1970s—Friedman argues that while the country is entering a decade of political dysfunction and societal volatility, these episodes are part of a recurring pattern of American reinvention. He predicts a new institutional framework and economic paradigm will emerge by the early 2030s, restoring national stability and renewing U.S. global influence.

Friedman also addresses China's long-term stability, forecasting that the country will eventually face internal fracture due to persistent regional inequality and political tensions. He describes China as a divided state, with a wealthy coastal corridor contrasted by an impoverished interior, and culturally distinct frontier regions such as Xinjiang, Tibet, and Inner Mongolia. Despite China's global economic reach, Friedman notes its relatively low per capita income and lack of meaningful military alliances. He argues that China is "desperately trying to hold it all together," and predicts that these internal contradictions will prevent it from sustaining its centralized model of governance over the long term. Rather than a sudden collapse, Friedman anticipates a gradual fragmentation of China's internal cohesion, limiting its capacity to rival the United States as a dominant global power.

== Personal life ==
Friedman is married to Meredith Friedman (née LeBard), has four children, and lives in Austin, Texas. He and his wife have co-authored several publications, including The Coming War with Japan.

== Bibliography ==
External videos
- Booknotes interview with Friedman and Meredith LeBard on The Coming War with Japan, June 9, 1991, C-SPAN
- Presentation by Friedman on America's Secret War, November 10, 2004, C-SPAN
- Presentation by Friedman on The Next 100 Years, January 28, 2009, C-SPAN
- Presentation by Friedman on The Next 100 Years, January 26, 2010, C-SPAN
- After Words interview with Friedman on The Next Decade, February 12, 2011, C-SPAN
- Presentation by Friedman on Flashpoints, January 28, 2015, C-SPAN

- The Political Philosophy of the Frankfurt School (1981). Cornell University Press, ISBN 0-8014-1279-X.
- The Coming War With Japan, with Meredith LeBard (1991). St Martins Press. Reprint edition, 1992, ISBN 0-312-07677-0.
- The Future of War: Power, Technology and American World Dominance in the Twenty-First Century, with Meredith Friedman (1996). Crown Publishers, 1st edition, ISBN 0-517-70403-X. St. Martin's Griffin, 1998, ISBN 0-312-18100-0.
- The Intelligence Edge: How to Profit in the Information Age with Meredith Friedman, Colin Chapman and John Baker (1997). Crown, 1st edition, ISBN 0-609-60075-3.
- America's Secret War: Inside the Hidden Worldwide Struggle Between the United States and Its Enemies (2004). Doubleday, 1st edition, ISBN 0-385-51245-7. Broadway, reprint edition (2005). ISBN 0-7679-1785-5.
- The Next 100 Years: A Forecast for the 21st Century (2009). Doubleday, ISBN 0-385-51705-X.
- The Next Decade: What the World Will Look Like (2011). ISBN 0-385-53294-6.
- Flashpoints: The Emerging Crisis in Europe (2015). Doubleday, ISBN 0-385-53633-X.
- The Storm Before the Calm: America's Discord, the Coming Crisis of the 2020s, and the Triumph Beyond (2020). Doubleday, ISBN 9780385540490
