= The Coming Collapse of China =

Book by Gordon G. Chang

- Author: Gordon G. Chang
- Language: English
- Subject: China
- Publisher: Random House
- Publication date: 2001
- Publication place: United States
- ISBN: 978-0812977561
- OCLC: 45636911
- Website: The Coming Collapse of China at the Internet Archive

The Coming Collapse of China is a book by Gordon G. Chang, published in 2001, in which he argued that the Chinese Communist Party (CCP) was the root cause of many of China's problems and would cause the country's collapse by 2011. When 2011 was almost over, Chang admitted that his prediction was wrong but said it was off by only a year, asserting in Foreign Policy that the CCP would fall in 2012. Consequently he made the magazine's "10 worst predictions of the year" twice.

== Summary ==
In the introduction of his first edition published in 2001, Gordon G. Chang, an American lawyer, predicted the following scenario:

The end of the modern Chinese state is near. The People's Republic has five years, perhaps ten, before it falls. This book tells why.

Based on the perceived inefficiency of state-run enterprises and the inability of the Chinese Communist Party to build an open democratic society, Chang argued that the hidden non-performing loans of the "Big Four" Chinese state banks would likely bring down China's financial system and its government, along with the entire country. He predicted specifically that the CCP would collapse by 2011.

== Reception ==
Dexter Roberts of Bloomberg Businessweek described the book as "Pessimism on a grand scale."

In 2002, Julia Lovell of The Observer stated that although China's entry to the World Trade Organization could provide Western investors with many new opportunities, Chang's book "marshalled ample evidence to dampen such expectations." In 2001, Patrick Tyler of The New York Times wrote:

As Chang discovered, China is a nation of contradictions. Many of its state industries are virtually bankrupt; its banking system sits on a mountain of unrecognized bad debts; its agriculture is primitive; pollution is out of control; and government interference and corruption are killing off a number of new business ventures...

— The New York Times, September 9, 2001

Academic Roland Boer describes the book as an example of the "China doomer" approach to historical nihilism. Academics Christopher Marquis and Kunyuan Qiao write that The Coming Collapse of China has been proven wrong and conclude that CCP governance of China will continue into the future.

Peter Thal Larsen writes in Reuters that the book "is now mostly referred to as a reminder of the dangers of making overly specific forecasts about the country’s future.

== Updates ==
In 2010, Chang wrote in The Christian Science Monitor that "China could fail soon" and predicted an economic crash. In an article, "The Coming Collapse of China: 2012 Edition," published by the Foreign Policy, Gordon G. Chang admitted that his prediction was wrong but arguing that he was off only by one year: "Instead of 2011, the mighty communist party of China will fall in 2012. Bet on it." On May 21, 2016, The National Interest published another article by Chang, "China's Coming Revolution." In it, he argued that the ruling class in China is divided and that it cannot deal with its economic problems. Chang claimed that would lead to a revolution, which would overthrow the CCP. He did not give the exact year that those events would take place.

== See also ==
- China threat theory
- The Coming War with Japan
- The Coming Conflict with China
