= Two Cannot be Denied =

Chinese Communist Party slogan

The Two Cannot be Denied (Chinese: 两个不能否定; pinyin: Liǎng gè bùnéng fǒudìng), also written as two cannot negate, is a political concept and slogan first proposed by Chinese Communist Party (CCP) general secretary Xi Jinping in January 2013. It refers to the phrase "the historical period after reform and opening up cannot be used to negate the historical period before reform and opening up, nor can the historical period before reform and opening up be used to negate the historical period after reform and opening up".

== History ==
The slogan refers to the historical and political position that "the historical period after reform and opening up cannot be used to negate the historical period before reform and opening up, nor can the historical period before reform and opening up be used to negate the historical period after reform and opening up". According to this view, the Mao period should not be criticized from the present-day point of view because it laid the foundation for China's socialist modernization.

In his speech at the "Seminar for New Members and Alternate Members of the Central Committee to Study and Implement the Spirit of the 18th National Congress" in early 2013, Xi Jinping said:

Chinese:

我们党领导人民进行社会主义建设，有“改革开放前”和“改革开放后”两个历史时期，这是两个相互联系又有重大区别的时期，但本质上都是我们党领导人民进行社会主义建设的实践探索。

不能用改革开放后的历史时期否定改革开放前的历史时期，也不能用改革开放前的历史时期否定改革开放后的历史时期。

如果当时全盘否定了毛泽东同志，那我们党还能站得住吗？我们国家的社会主义制度还能站得住吗？那就站不住了，站不住就会天下大乱。

[Our Party has led the people in socialist construction in two historical periods, "before reform and opening up" and "after reform and opening up". These are two periods that are interrelated and have significant differences, but in essence they are both practical explorations of our Party leading the people in socialist construction.

The historical period after reform and opening up cannot be used to negate the historical period before reform and opening up, nor can the historical period before reform and opening up be used to negate the historical period after reform and opening up.

If we had completely negated Comrade Mao Zedong at that time, would our Party still be able to stand? Would our country's socialist system still be able to stand? Of course it would not be able to stand, and if it did not stand, there would be chaos under heaven.]

— Xi Jinping

On November 8, 2013, the People's Daily published a full-page article by the Party History Research Office entitled "Correctly Viewing the Two Historical Periods Before and After Reform and Opening Up — Studying General Secretary Xi Jinping's Important Discussion on 'Two Things That Cannot Be Negated'", which stressed the need to "correctly understand and grasp" the two historical periods before and after reform and opening up. The article states:

Chinese:

正确认识两个不否定，不只是历史问题，更是现实的政治问题；处理不好，就会产生严重政治后果。

敌对势力这两个方面的否定，从根本上说，都是对历史事实的背离，都是想搞乱人心，企图瓦解中国共产党执政的历史依据和思想根基，进而毁掉社会主义中国的未来和广大中国人民的福祉。“前车之覆，后车之鉴。 ”苏联解体、苏共垮台的一个重要原因，就是全面否定苏联历史、苏共历史，否定列宁等领袖人物，搞历史虚无主义，把人们的思想搞乱了。

如果不能正确对待党所走过的弯路，就会动摇对党的信赖，动摇对中国特色社会主义的信念，动摇对实现中华民族伟大复兴的信心；最终受到损害的还是党和国家的事业，以及与这个事业紧密联系在一起的广大人民群众的根本利益。

[Correctly understanding the two non-negations is not only a historical issue, but also a current political issue; if not handled properly, it will have serious political consequences.

Fundamentally speaking, these two aspects of the hostile forces' denial are both deviations from historical facts, and are intended to confuse people's minds and undermine the historical basis and ideological foundation of the Chinese Communist Party's rule, thereby destroying the future of socialist China and the well-being of the Chinese people. "Error of the past is the wisdom and success of the future." An important reason for the disintegration of the Soviet Union and the collapse of the Soviet Communist Party was the comprehensive denial of the history of the Soviet Union and the Soviet Communist Party, the denial of Lenin and other leaders, the promotion of historical nihilism, and the confusion of people's minds.

If we fail to correctly deal with the detours the Party has taken, it will shake our trust in the Party, our belief in socialism with Chinese characteristics, and our confidence in realizing the great rejuvenation of the Chinese nation; what will ultimately be harmed are the cause of the Party and the country, as well as the fundamental interests of the broad masses of the people who are closely linked to this cause.]

— Xi Jinping

== See also ==
- Ideology of the Chinese Communist Party
- Historical nihilism
- Xi Jinping Thought
