= Gordon G. Chang =

American lawyer (born 1951)

- 章家敦
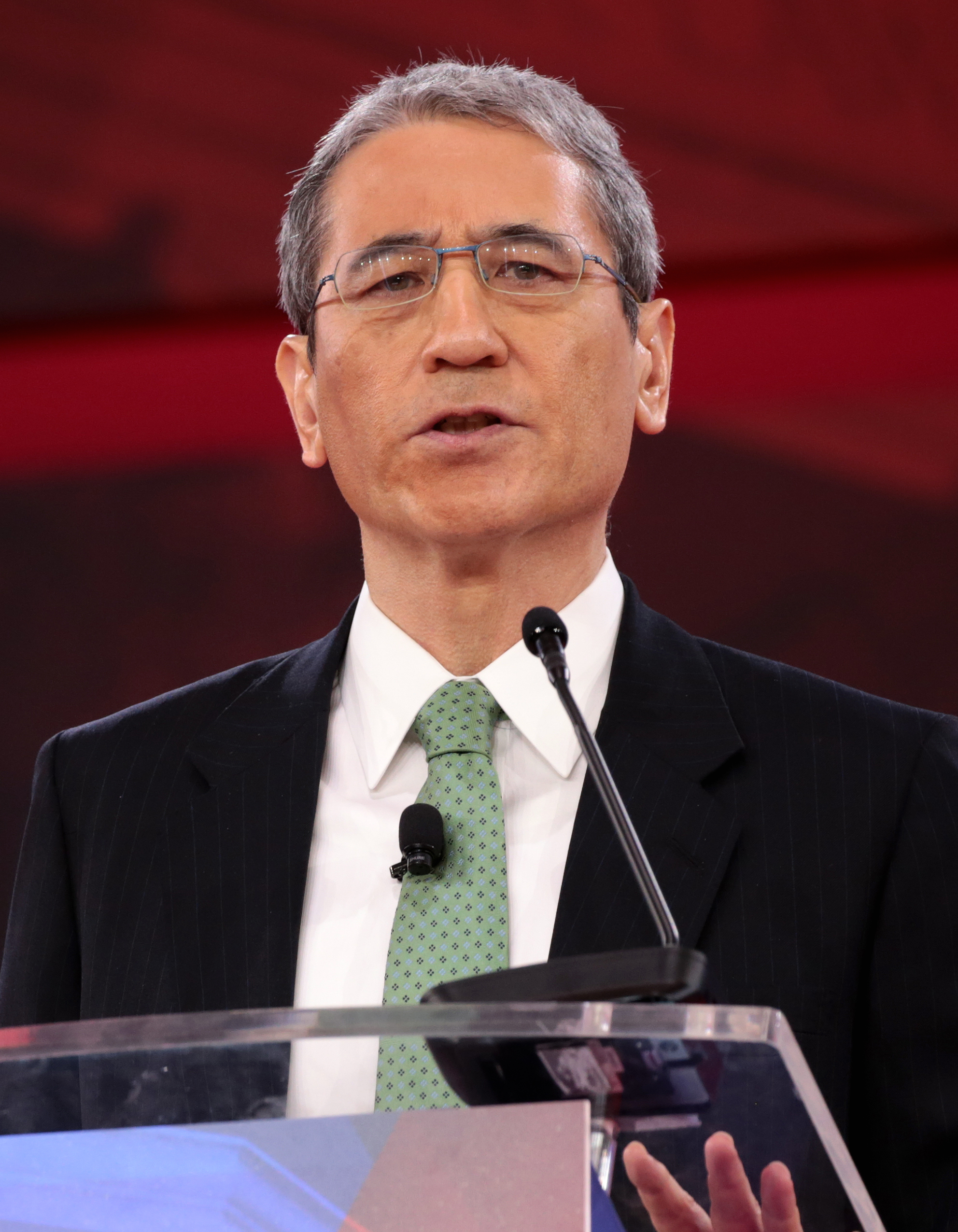
- Chang in 2018
- Born: Gordon Guthrie Chang; July 5, 1951 (age 75); Long Branch, New Jersey, U.S.
- Education: Cornell University (BA, JD)
- Occupations: Journalist; political commentator; writer; lawyer
- Spouse: Lydia Tam

Chinese name
- Chinese: 章家敦
Transcriptions
Standard Mandarin
- Hanyu Pinyin: Zhāng Jiādūn
- Wade–Giles: Chang¹ Chia¹-tun¹
- Gordon C. Chang's voice Recorded April 2021
- Website: www.gordonchang.com

Gordon Guthrie Chang (Chinese: 章家敦; born July 5, 1951) is an American lawyer, political analyst and conservative columnist known for his hawkish rhetoric on China. He is the author of the 2001 book The Coming Collapse of China in which he predicted the collapse of China by 2011. In December 2011, he changed the timing of the year of the predicted collapse to 2012.

In 1976, Chang graduated from the Cornell Law School. He then lived in mainland China and in Hong Kong for close to two decades, where he worked as Partner and Counsel at the law firms Baker & McKenzie and Paul, Weiss, Rifkind, Wharton & Garrison LLP.

== Early life and education ==
Chang was born in New Jersey to a Chinese father and an American mother of Scottish ancestry. His father is from Rugao, Jiangsu, China.

In 1969, Chang graduated from Columbia High School in Maplewood, New Jersey, where he was class president in his senior year. Four years later, he graduated from Cornell University, where he was a columnist for The Cornell Daily Sun and a member of the Quill and Dagger society. In 1976, Chang graduated with a Juris Doctor degree from the Cornell Law School.

== Career ==
Chang lived and worked in mainland China and Hong Kong for almost two decades, most recently in Shanghai, as counsel to the law firm Paul Weiss and earlier in Hong Kong as Partner in the law firm Baker & McKenzie. Chang has been elected twice as a trustee of Cornell University.

=== Commentator ===
His writings have appeared in The New York Times, The Wall Street Journal, The Daily Beast, the International Herald Tribune, Commentary, National Review, and Barron’s among others, and he has appeared on CNN, Fox News, MSNBC, CNBC, PBS, Bloomberg Television, and others as well on as The Daily Show with Jon Stewart.

Chang is a contributing editor for 19FortyFive, member of the advisory board of the Global Taiwan Institute, and member of the Board of Directors of the Conservative Political Action Conference.

==== China ====
Chang has made numerous predictions of the imminent collapse of the Chinese government and fall of the Communist Party since 2001 including the specific years. In the 2001 book The Coming Collapse of China, Chang insisted that the government would collapse in 2011. When 2011 was almost over, he admitted that his prediction was wrong but said that he was off by only a year and wrote in the Foreign Policy magazine, that "Instead of 2011, the mighty Communist Party of China will fall in 2012. Bet on it." Consequently, he made Foreign Policy's "10 worst predictions of the year" twice in a row when his predictions were proven wrong again.

Chang has said that China is not trying to compete with the United States within the Westphalian order but to overthrow that order altogether. In his book The Great U.S.–China Tech War (2020), Chang posits that China and the United States are involved in a "cold tech war," with the winner being able to dominate the 21st century.

According to Chang, Chinese students in the United States are controlled by the authoritarian regime in China. He said that Chinese students "have become the long arm of authoritarianism" and collect intelligence for the Chinese regime.

In 2011, Chang stated that China was the "new dot-com bubble" and added that the rapid growth by China was contradicted by various internal factors, including a decrease in population growth and a slowdown of retail sales. In a separate interview, he remarked that China achieved its 149.2 percent trade surplus with the United States by "lying, cheating, and stealing" and that if China decided to realize its threat, expressed since August 2007, to sell its Treasury bonds, it would actually hurt its own economy since it is reliant on exports to the United States. The US economy would be hurt by a selloff of Treasuries, which would cause the US to buy less from China, which would in turn hurt the Chinese economy.

In a 2022 piece for the Gatestone Institute, Chang suggested that Taiwan could deter the PRC by threatening a conventional missile attack on the Three Gorges Dam and signal that they are "prepared to take Chinese lives in the hundreds of millions" by drowning the population downstream of the dam. This would pack "the wallop of a nuclear" strike. Chang believes that the United States should help Taiwan manufacture more missiles with such capabilities.

In a 2026 interview with Fox News, United States President Donald Trump stated he has "very good relationship" with General Secretary of the Chinese Communist Party Xi Jinping and criticized Chang's understanding of the United States' relationship with China in the context of US-China trade war, with Trump stating: "I listen to this Gordon Chang [on China]. He has no idea what he's talking about."

==== Other views ====
In Nuclear Showdown: North Korea Takes on the World (2006), Chang says that North Korea is most likely to target Japan, not South Korea. He also says that North Korean nuclear ambitions could be forestalled if there were concerted multinational diplomacy, with some "limits to patience" backed up by threat of an all-out Korean war.

Chang often criticized South Korean President Moon Jae-in's term as "dangerous" and said that Moon should be considered "North Korea's agent." Chang also asserted that Moon Jae-in is "subverting freedom, democracy, and South Korea."

During the COVID-19 pandemic, Chang praised the U.S. claiming it had acted "very, very quickly" in response to the epidemic. In what The New Yorker described as the "loopiest" speech of CPAC 2023, Chang alleged that the Chinese government had "deliberately spread [COVID-19] beyond its borders to America and to the world". He has also claimed in relation to the second wave of COVID-19 in India that "it is entirely possible [China] released another pathogen." He also made claims that China was "likely planning to launch pathogen" from an illegal California lab. However a federal investigation into the lab in question, had not substantiated those claims but instead determined that it wasn't trying to make biological weapons, but instead was simply growing antibody cells to produce test kits for COVID-19.

In a 2019 Wall Street Journal opinion piece, Chang stated that Donald Trump is "the only thing that stands between us and a world dominated by China."

== See also ==
- Chinese Americans in New York City
- New Yorkers in journalism
