= Stratfor =

American geopolitical advising firm

Stratfor Enterprises, LLC
- Type: Private
- Industry: Publishing
- Founded: 1996
- Founder: George Friedman
- Headquarters: Austin, Texas, U.S.
- Key people: Chip Harmon (Pres.); Fred Burton (VP Intel, 2004–2020)
- Products: Worldview; Threat Lens
- Services: Advising
- Revenue: ~US$10M (2021 est.)
- Number of employees: ~100 (2016)
- Parent: Rane Corporation
- Website: www.stratfor.com

Strategic Forecasting Inc. is an American strategic intelligence publishing company founded in 1996. Stratfor's business model is to provide individual and enterprise subscriptions to Stratfor Worldview, its online publication, and to perform intelligence gathering for corporate clients. The focus of Stratfor's content is security issues and analyzing geopolitical risk.

== History ==
The origin of Stratfor can be traced to the Center for Geopolitical Studies (CGPS) at Louisiana State University in Baton Rouge, Louisiana. There, professors George Friedman and Leonard Hochberg built a team that researched geopolitics, built wargaming simulations, and advised companies on geopolitical risks and opportunities.

The company was founded in 1996 and named Strategic Forecasting (Stratfor) by lead analyst Matthew S. Baker. It was moved to Austin in August 1997 with seven members of the CGPS team who served as part of the co-founding team along with founder George Friedman.

George served as the head of analysis for the organization, and the business was led by several CEOs in the late 1990s and early 2000s as it refined its offerings. Chip Harmon was appointed president in February 2018.

Stratfor was acquired by RANE in 2020.

== Structure and operations ==
Stratfor clients have included academic institutions, investment firms, and large corporations such as Lockheed Martin, Goldman Sachs, Bank of America, the Coca-Cola Company, and Dow Chemical Company. Many of Stratfor's operatives previously worked for the U.S. government.

Media coverage of their ideas about the 1998 bombing of Iraq brought Stratfor into the public eye. At this time, the company had about twenty employees. By 2008 they were up to 40 full-time employees in Austin. 2016 saw the number rise to about 100, three-quarters of whom were based in Austin. Stratfor often hired and trained interns from the nearby University of Texas.

Stratfor analysts pay for information, but also use open source information to predict where global crises will arise. Stratfor also obtains information by way of personal networks. Fred Burton indicated in leaked emails that he maintained contact with his trusted former CIA sources as a source of information, and that he was aware of the sealed indictment against Julian Assange in 2011. Barron's Jonathan Laing has called Stratfor founder George Friedman "one of our favorite experts on geopolitics," saying, "His judgments tend to be more nuanced and long-term than those of the press or Wall Street." More recently, The Atlantic's James Fallows referenced a Stratfor article on U.S. strategy in Iraq and Ukraine, following outbreaks of turmoil in those regions.

Friedman resigned from the company in 2015 to launch a new company, Geopolitical Futures.

Dun & Bradstreet's estimate of Stratfor's 2021 revenue is $11.61 million.

=== Funding ===
In October 2015, Stratfor raised $12 million in funding through a growth equity investment by Dallas-based Teakwood Capital. Stratfor planned to use the funds to expand its reporting networks, improve operational infrastructure, and move into new markets.

== Books ==
Kamran Bokhari, Stratfor's former vice president for Middle East and South Asian affairs, co-wrote Political Islam in the Age of Democratization (2013). Reviewer Amani el Sehrawey called the book "an invaluable tool for those seeking to gain knowledge of the nuances of the political systems of the Muslim world from a historical perspective, as well as to understand the contemporary changes happening in the region."

== Hack and publication of emails ==
On December 24, 2011, Stratfor's website was hacked. Anonymous claimed responsibility, and also posted data they claim was taken from Stratfor, including credit card details, passwords, and addresses of Stratfor clients. Their email system was also compromised. Leaked emails were published by WikiLeaks and revealed Stratfor's surveillance of groups such as Occupy Wall Street and activists fighting for compensation from Dow Chemical for the Bhopal disaster.

In November 2013, computer hacker Jeremy Hammond was sentenced to ten years in federal prison for his role in the Anonymous attack. An FBI informant, Hector Xavier Monsegur (also known as "Sabu"), initially faced 124 years in prison for his role in the attack, but his sentence was reduced to time served plus one year's supervised release in May 2014 in exchange for his cooperation as an FBI informant.

WikiLeaks announced the initial publication of more than five million of Stratfor's e-mail messages on February 26, 2012, under the name Global Intelligence Files. Anonymous said it had leaked the emails to WikiLeaks. George Friedman stated that third parties may have forged or altered the e-mail messages, but that Stratfor would not validate either alterations or authenticity. Stratfor condemned the release.
