= Tigawa =

Village and archaeological site in India

Tigawa Temple
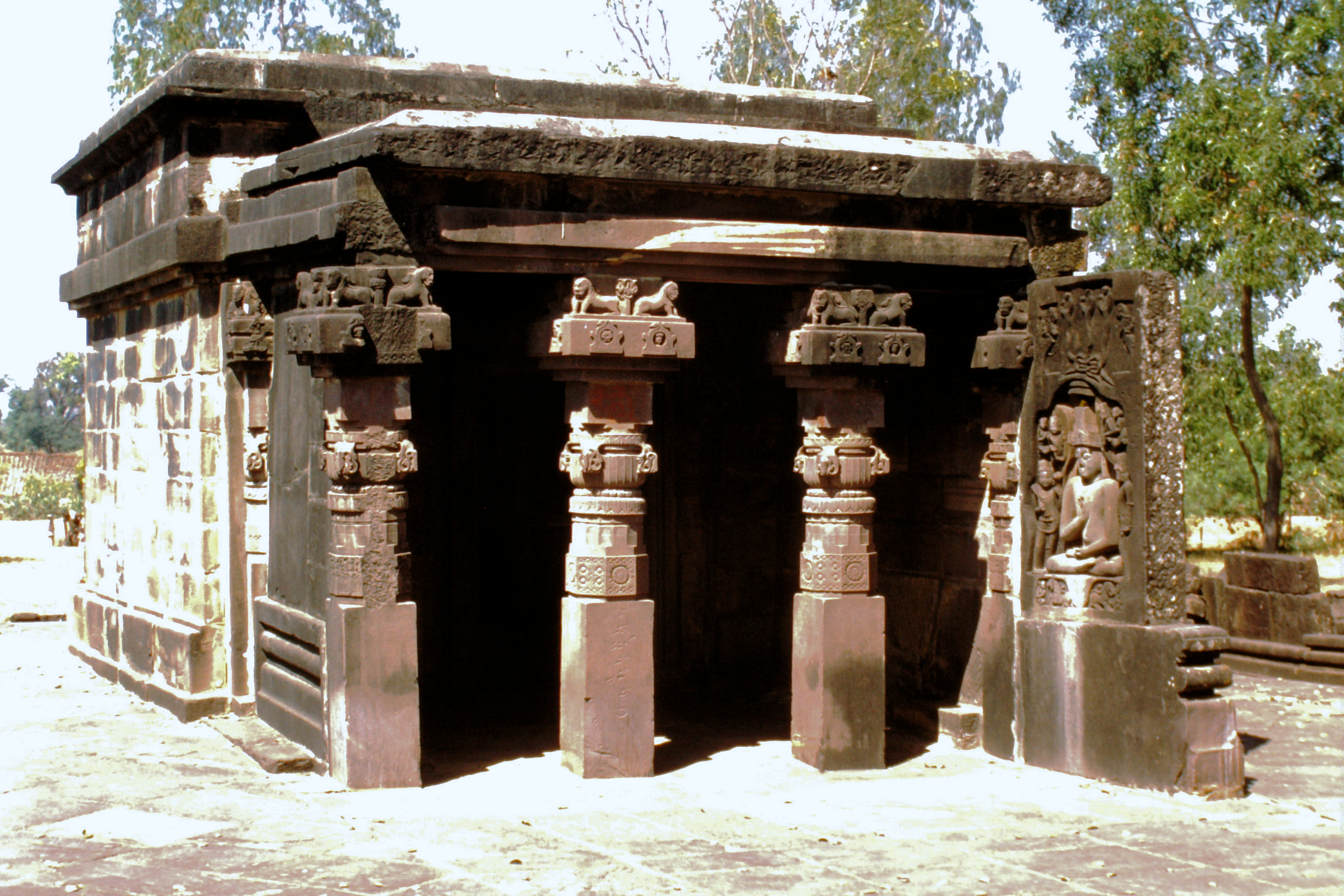
- 5th-century Kankali Devi temple

- Location within India Location within Madhya Pradesh

Religion
- Affiliation: Hinduism
- District: Katni district
- Deity: Vishnu, Shakti (Chamunda), others

Location
- Location: Tigwan, Bahoriband
- State: Madhya Pradesh
- Country: India
- Coordinates: 23°41′24.4″N 80°03′58.9″E

Architecture
- Style: Gupta era
- Completed: c. 400-425 CE

Tigawa is a village in Indian state of Madhya Pradesh and an archaeological site with a complex of about 36 Hindu temple ruins. Of these, the small but important and ancient Kankali Devi Temple is in good condition, and is usually dated to about 400-425 CE. Unless another building is mentioned, references to "the temple" below refer to this.

Also referred to as Tigowa or Tigwan, the site is about 4 kilometres (2.5 mi) north of Bahuriband between Katni and Jabalpur. The Hindu temple ruins were badly damaged during a colonial-era railway project when a contractor demolished and excavated the ruins as building material for the railway project.

Of the monuments, the Kankali Devi Temple is most notable and is a Gupta period temple. It is one of the oldest surviving Hindu temples, illustrating the formative stages of Hindu temple architecture and the essential elements found in the north Indian style through the modern era. It has a sanctum and an open portico supported on four pillars. The sides of the portico were filled in with walls containing panels at a later period. The sanctuary is, and always was, covered with a flat roof, and is generally very similar to the Gupta period Temple 17 at Sanchi.

Despite its name, the temple was probably dedicated to Vishnu, with other elements added later. An image of him as Narasimha is placed inside the sanctum. The portico has an image of the Sheshashai Vishnu (Narayana) and another one of Chamunda (Kankali Devi). Projecting from the front of the portico is a later relief of a seated Vishnu in the yoga asana position with a serpent hood above the head.

== Location ==
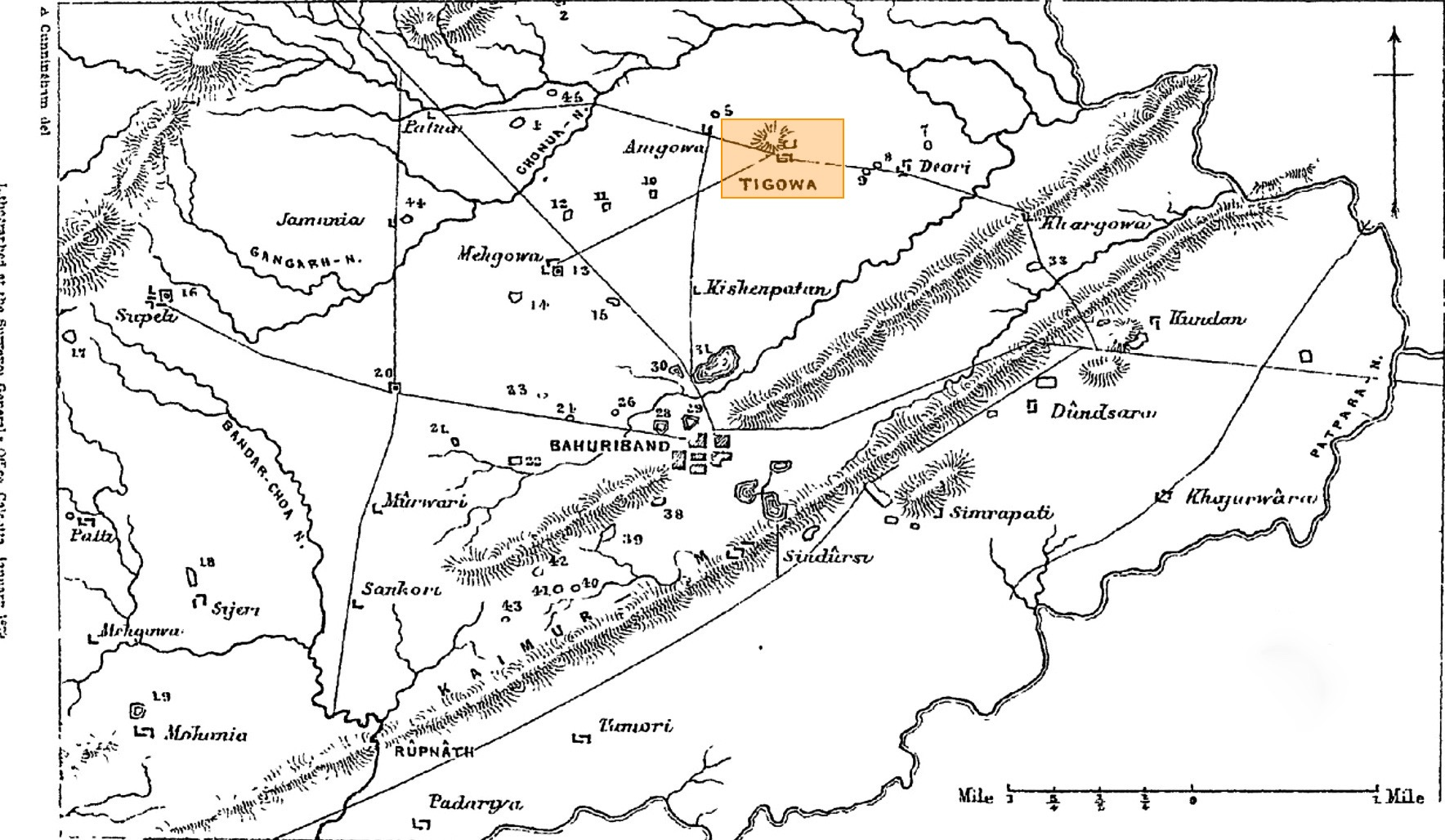
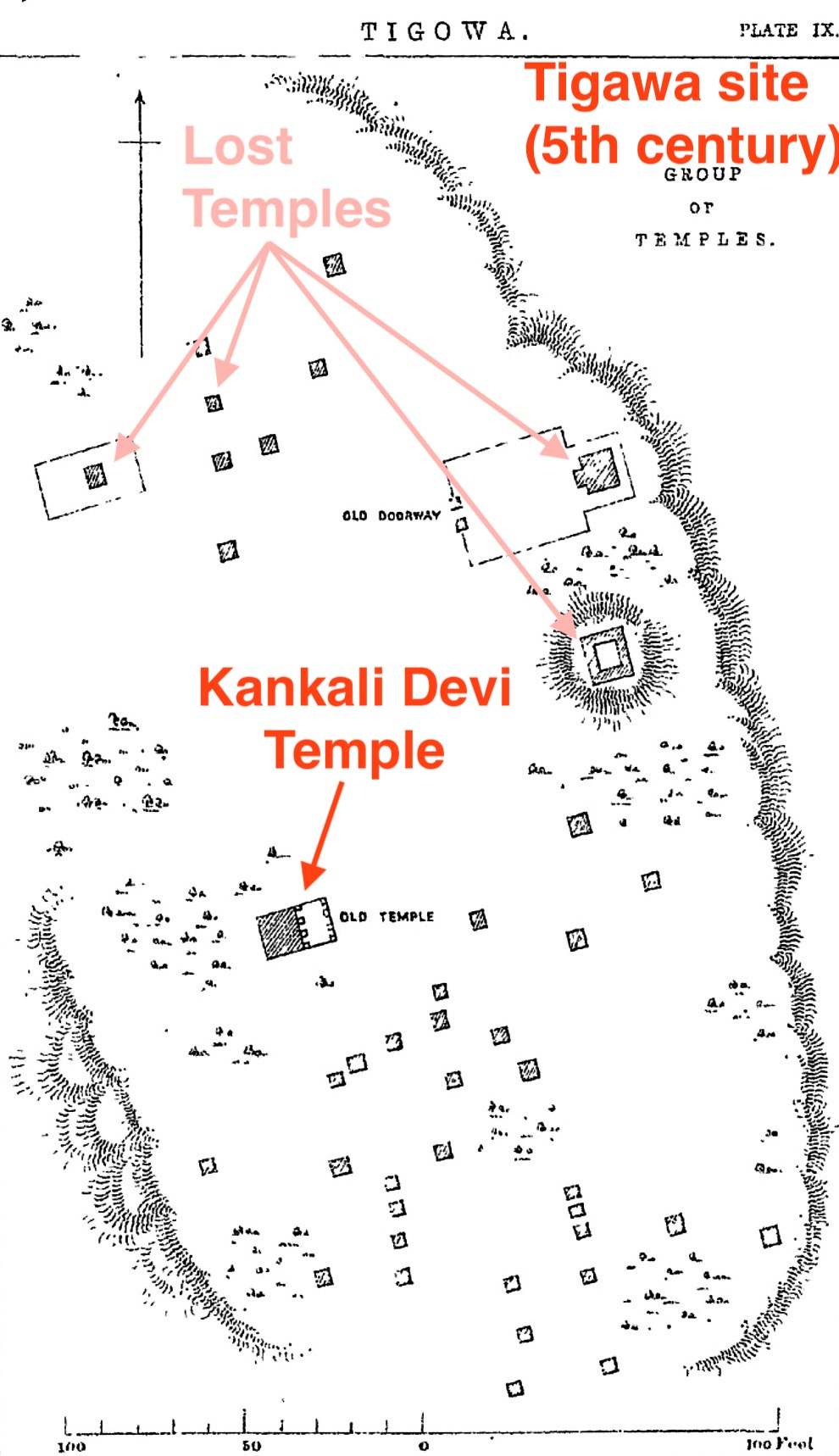
Tigawa geology and site layout.

The Tigawa temples site is in the eponymous village Tigawa, also called Tigwan, in the Katni district and north of the town of Bahuriband. It is about 50 kilometres (31 mi) west of Katni, 70 kilometres (43 mi) north of Jabalpur, 350 kilometres (220 mi) east of Bhopal and 300 kilometres (190 mi) east of Sanchi and Udayagiri Gupta era monuments. The site is located on a plateau near the Kaimur range of hills, with belts of rocks, where ancient Indians used the local geology to build numerous small dams to harvest rainwater into water reservoirs that locals call jhils. These reservoirs extend from Bahuriband to the north of Tigawa. (Note: Bahuriband literally means "many dams".) The local tradition is that there was in the distant past a large city in that location, which would explain the numerous mounds found in their region and when excavated, these mounds have yielded broken pottery and bricks. Alexander Cunningham speculated in 1879 that the Bahuriband (also Bahulaband, about 4 kilometres (2.5 mi) south of Tigawa) may have been the city that Ptolemy transliterated as Tholabana.

The name Tigawa (Tigowa, Tigoan, Tigwan) may be derived from "Tri-gawa" or "three villages", referring to the neighboring villages of Amgowa and Deori. Local tradition believes that it once had a fort and it was part of a major town named Jhanjhangarh, a suburb of ancient Bahuriband.

== History ==
The Tigawa site is a relatively small site consisting of a mound measuring about 30,000 square feet (2,800 m^{2}) with a length of about 250 feet (76 m). The entire space was covered with over 36 temples of different sizes, the smallest one just 16 square feet (1.5 m^{2}) built from square cut stones. All these small temples are gone, including some larger standing ones. The square cut stones of these temples were deemed a ready quarry for a railroad project by a late 19th-century railway contractor. They demolished and hauled away about 200 carts of the temple stones. (Note: This was not an isolated case. According to Cunningham, the "great temple at Bilhari" was similarly destroyed.) The local villagers submitted a petition to the British official in Jabalpur about 70 kilometers away, to stop the desecration. The official issued a halt order in the 1870s, thus helped preserve the remnants of the site. One stone temple that was too big for the railway project remained untouched, which locals call the Kankali Devi temple and further scholarship identified it to be one of the oldest Hindu temples of the Gupta era. An upset Alexander Cunningham wrote, "to the railway contractor the finest temple is only a heap of ready squared stones", and "the temple of Jerusalem, a ready quarry is to him, and it is nothing more".

=== Date ===
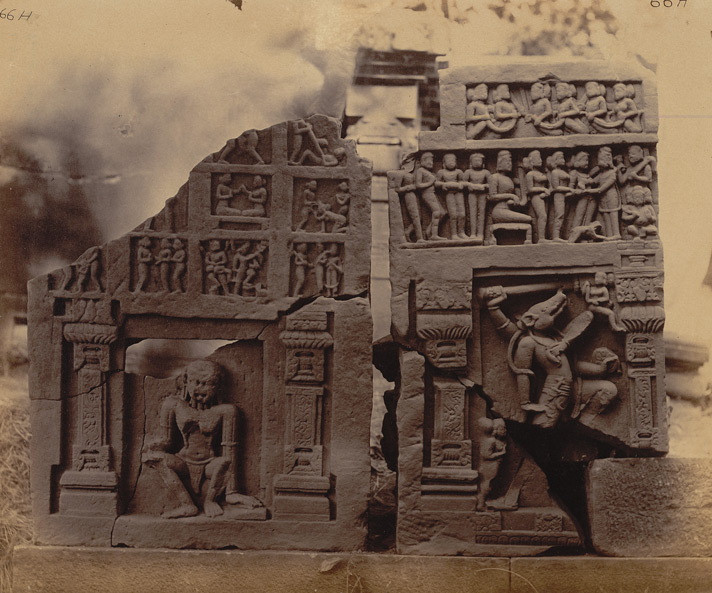
Relief panels, 1875 photo

The Tigawa temple is generally dated to the early 5th century CE, though some scholars have dated it to other periods. After comparing it to the hundreds of Buddhist, Hindu and Jain monuments he had seen during his tours, Cunningham argued based on stylistic grounds, iconography, and architecture, that the "original [Tigawa] temple undoubtedly belongs to the Gupta period, and cannot, therefore, be later than the fifth century A.D.; but it is more probably as old as the third century".

In 1957, Mate narrowed the estimate for the Tigawa temple to fourth or fifth century, along with those for Udaigiri and Sanchi. Percy Brown, in 1959, estimated that the Udaigiri is older, adding that the Sanchi and Tigawa temples were probably completed between 400 and 450 CE. Later scholarship has largely placed the Tigawa temple in the early 5th century, or 400-425 CE range. George Michell calls it "late 5th century".

== Description ==
The Tigawa site had more than 36 temples, some with sculptures and mandapas. All of these before their destruction, reported Cunningham in 1879, were Brahmanical temples with no sign of any Buddhist or Jain motifs or art. The smallest temples in the range of 4 × 4 to 6 × 6 square feet were walled on three sides. Temples bigger than these, but smaller than 12 × 12 square feet, had a fourth wall with entrance doorways with two pilasters. Those even bigger had a mandapa in front with four pillars. All temples, small or large, had a spire with amalaka on top, confirmed by the remnant ruins. Of these, one named Kankali Devi temple is notable, states George Michell - an art historian and a professor specializing in Hindu architecture, because "of the free-standing temples erected during the period of Gupta rule, only those of Sanchi and Tigawa have been completely preserved" and these two "define clearly the essential architectural scheme of the north Indian temple". The Tigawa temple is emblematic illustration of the formative stages of Hindu sacred architecture.

=== Kankali Devi temple: Vaishnavism tradition ===
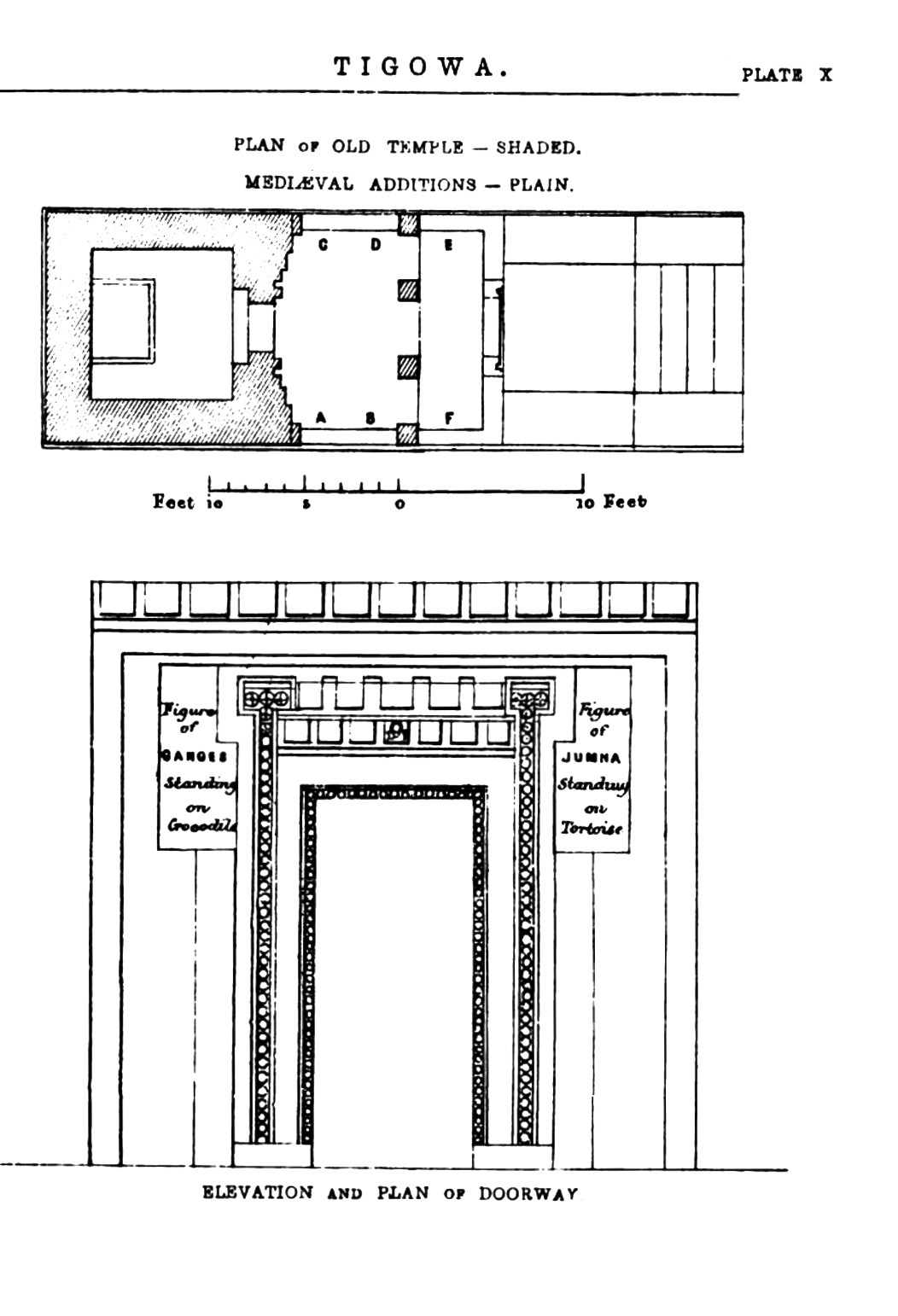
The Tigawa temple square plan and its sanctum's doorway design.

The Kankali Devi temple has a square sanctum with a 12.5 feet (3.8 m) side outside and 8 feet (2.4 m) side inside. The sanctum does not open exactly to the east, but deviates by about 13 degrees, which Cunningham speculated may be intentional and related to "one nakshatra" (lunar house, Hindu calendar).

The temple has an open portico supported on four pillars that projects 7 feet (2.1 m) in front of the sanctum. Both the pillared porch and the sanctum are on a raised plinth, its roof made from horizontal slabs of stone. The pillars of the mandapa are massive, shaped into three symmetric cross sections: a long square sectioned part close to the ground, above it an octagonal and sixteen-edged. Above these is a circular part capped with pot and foliage capitals. On top of the pillars are sculptures of two crouching lions with a tree separating them. The pillars are identical in all respects except the tree: one pillar has a mango tree, another a palm, while the other two trees unclear. The portico was partially walled later, according to Percy Brown.

The temple door jambs are intricately carved, in vertical bands that are concentric around the entrance. On top left of the entrance wall is river goddess Ganga holding a water vessel and riding her crocodile vahana, while the top right has river goddess Yamuna also holding a water vessel while riding her tortoise vahana. Goddess Ganga is plucking a fruit from custard-apple tree, while Yamuna is plucking one from a mango tree.

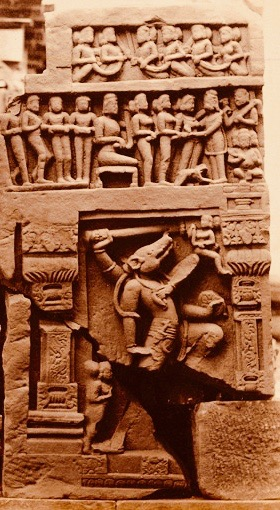
A Vishnu relief from the temple narrating the man-boar Varaha legend and the Samudra manthan mythology.

The Kankali Devi Temple has reliefs showing Vishnu and generally considered to have been dedicated to Vishnu of Vaishnavism. An image of Narasimha, the man-lion avatar of Vishnu, is placed inside the sanctum. The portico has an image of the Sheshashai Vishnu (Narayana). Another shows Varaha, the man-boar avatar of Vishnu.

In front of the temple is a seated Gautam buddha image in yoga asana position (Vitark Mudra) with serpent hood above the head, similar to seated Tirthankaras . The temple also reverentially displays Shaktism and Shaivism themes, including a Chamunda (Kankali Devi) panel which gives the temple its name. On the wall opposite to Kankali Devi is Kali Devi (fierce form of Durga). Cunningham proposed that these Shaiva and Vaishnava reliefs were probably added around the 8th century.

The Kankali Devi temple is similar to the Gupta period Temple #17 at Sanchi, with both illustrating the basic elements of Hindu sacred architecture. The temple style is also similar to the Hindu cave temples of Udayagiri and the Eran temple, both of which can be dated to be from the Gupta era because of the inscriptions found there.

A 7th or 8th-century CE Sanskrit inscription mentions the visit of a Umadeva of Kanyakubja, son of Samanya Bhatta, who had come to worship at the temple of Sitabhadra. There are also two inscriptions in Sankha Lipi.

== Significance ==
The Tigawa temple has been one of the Gupta era temples, along with those at Udayagiri, Sanchi, Eran (Airikina), Nachna, Besnagar, Bhumara, Bhitargaon and others, which together helped identify characteristic markers of ancient Hindu temples and to chronologically place Hindu architecture. These were proposed by Cunningham and refined over time. According to a Cunningham proposal, the pre-6th century freestanding and structural Hindu temples were likely closer in appearance to temples made from wood and brick or in caves. The artists would have been inclined to reproduce the older architectural elements, style and designs with new materials of construction such as cut stone, masonry or monolithic rocks. The key markers for ancient Hindu temples, suggested Cunningham, include a square sanctum with a flat roof or simpler spire, an elaborately decorated doorway into the sanctum with parallel vertical bands of carvings, presence of river goddesses Ganga and Yamuna flanking the bottom or top of the sanctum's entrance or the main temple, (Note: According to James Harle, the two rivers went through the heart of what encompassed the Gupta Empire domains, it may reflect the consequent vogue for the personification of the rivers that meant so much to the region's prosperity.) the use of bosses on capitals similar to those found in Buddhist stupas, and the presence of pillars with massive square capitals. According to Cunningham, another indicator of an ancient Hindu monument is that the temple is not exactly aligned to the east but displaced by between 5 and 15 degrees from a cardinal direction or aligned in other direction, which may have happened to match certain luni-solar calendar calculations or because the standardization of the direction happened a bit later. Kramrisch cautions, however, that these guidelines are neither rigid nor imply a sequentially ordered development with abandonment of the style, because a few of these features such as flat or simple superstructure is found in temples dated between the 5th and 10th centuries.

The Kankali Devi temple is also significant for being almost identical in its architecture to Temple 17 at Sanchi. The Sanchi shrine too is dated to the early 5th century. Given the Kankali Devi temple at Tigawa is at a Hindu site while Sanchi shrine is in a Buddhist site, states George Michell, this demonstrates that there were close links between Hindu and Buddhist architecture in the 5th century.

== Nearby site ==
A Jain temple with a 12.17 feet (3.71 m) high state of Tirthankara Shantinath is in Bahuriband with a generally well-preserved Kalchuri period inscription dated between 1022 CE and 1047 CE.

== See also ==
- Hindu temple architecture
- Aihole – a site with over 100 Hindu, Jain and Buddhist monuments, some about 5th-century
- Badami cave temples – 6th century Hindu and Jain cave temples and arts
- Bhumara
- Dashavatara Temple, Deogarh
- Gop Temple
- Nachna Hindu temples
- Pattadakal – a site with highly developed 7th and 8th century Hindu, Jain temples and arts
