= Shankhalipi =

Undeciphered script

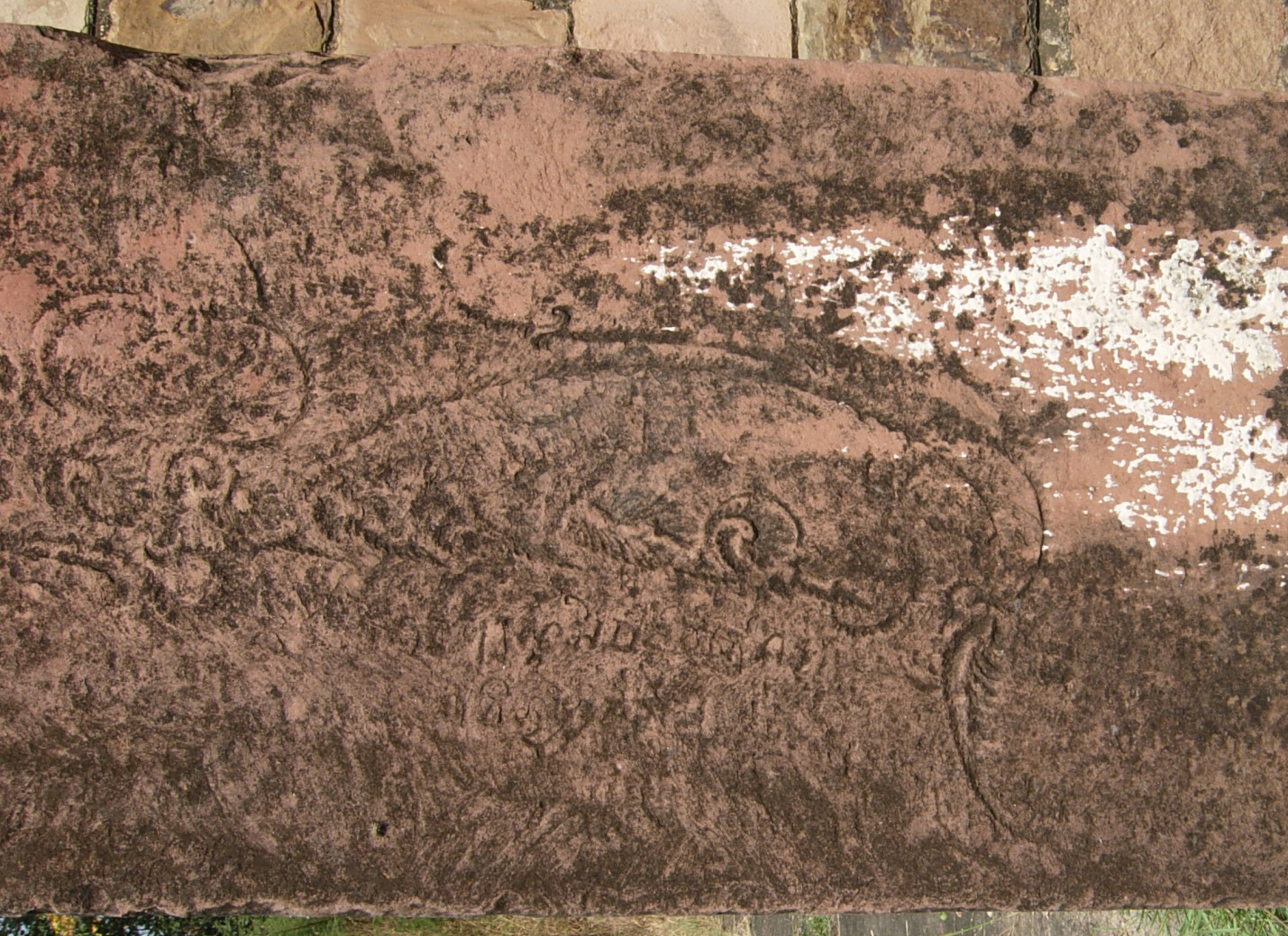
Detail of a pillar at Deogarh (Lalitpur district, Nepal) showing Brāhmī and shell inscriptions.

Shankhalipi (IAST: Śaṅkhalipi) or "conch-script" is a term used by scholars to describe presently undeciphered ornate spiral characters assumed to be Brahmi derivative that resemble conch shells (or shankhas) which can tentatively be assigned a new script family. They are found in inscriptions across various parts of India except the far south and date to between the 4th and 8th centuries BCE to upto 8th century AD. Both Shankhalipi and ornate Brahmi were stylised scripts used primarily for names and signatures.

== Distribution ==
Shell inscriptions are found across much of India, from Bihar in the east to western India, Maharashtra and Karnataka. Prominent sites with shell inscriptions include the Mundeshwari Temple in Bihar, the Udayagiri Caves in central India, Mansar in Maharashtra and some of the cave sites of western India. Shell inscriptions are also reported in Java.

== Location of inscriptions ==
Shell inscriptions were engraved on temple pillars, free-standing columns and rock surfaces, the latter generally at sites with prominent cave shrines. Rock shelters in Madhya Pradesh, Bengal and Karnataka have painted examples. The inscriptions consist of a small number of characters, generally no more than ten to twelve syllables. The shell script was never used for long records or discursive texts. This suggests that the shell inscriptions are names or auspicious symbols or a combination of the two. In a few instances, shell inscriptions are paired with Brāhmī letters, as in the example at Deogarh, Uttar Pradesh, illustrated here. Shell letters are normally the same size or slightly bigger than Brāhmī letters, but in some cases they are gigantic, several metres high, as at the Udayagiri Caves. In September 2021, a Gupta era temple with shankhalipi was discovered from Etah district of Uttar Pradesh.

== Nature of script and its decipherment ==
The first detailed study of shell inscriptions was undertaken by Richard Salomon. The script is assumed to be a Brāhmī derivative, but Salomon observed that if this is the case, shell script has diverged so far from the normal pattern as to be effectively a new script family. Salomon determined that there are a sufficient number of shell characters to represent the syllables of the Sanskrit language, and tentatively assigned sounds to some of characters. B. N. Mukherjee subsequently proposed a system of decipherment based on a few key inscriptions using the assumptions that the script is an ornamental form of the contemporary Brahmi script through the centuries. Salomon had questioned his approach, in part because Mukherjee based his readings on a record that he turned upside down. Prof. B.N. Mukherjee proposed his decipherment based on a few key inscriptions, and has suggested that the ornamental characters are often rotated. The volume edited by Dr. R.K. Sharma includes a number of inscriptions that have been deciphered using B.N. Mukherjee's approach. Most of the Sankha-lipi inscriptions are from the Gupta period and are names of individuals, akin to ornamental signatures, although some predate the Gupta period. A collection of articles on the study of the script appeared in 1990 which included decipherment of many of the inscriptions

== Dating ==
No shell inscriptions with dates or numbers have been reported. The chronological horizon of the script can, however, be determined by the objects on which shell characters are written. If the Deogarh pillar dates to the fifth century, then the shell inscription on it belongs to a later time, perhaps the late fifth or early sixth century. A shell inscription, reported by Salomon, was found on a pillar of the Gurjara-Pratihara period at Pathari, showing that the writing system survived to the ninth century. At the Udayagiri Caves, sculptures of the Gupta period (those at the site are generally dated to the opening of the fifth century), are cut through shell inscriptions, showing that the shell characters are older. This evidence suggests that the shell script was in use from the fourth to the ninth century.

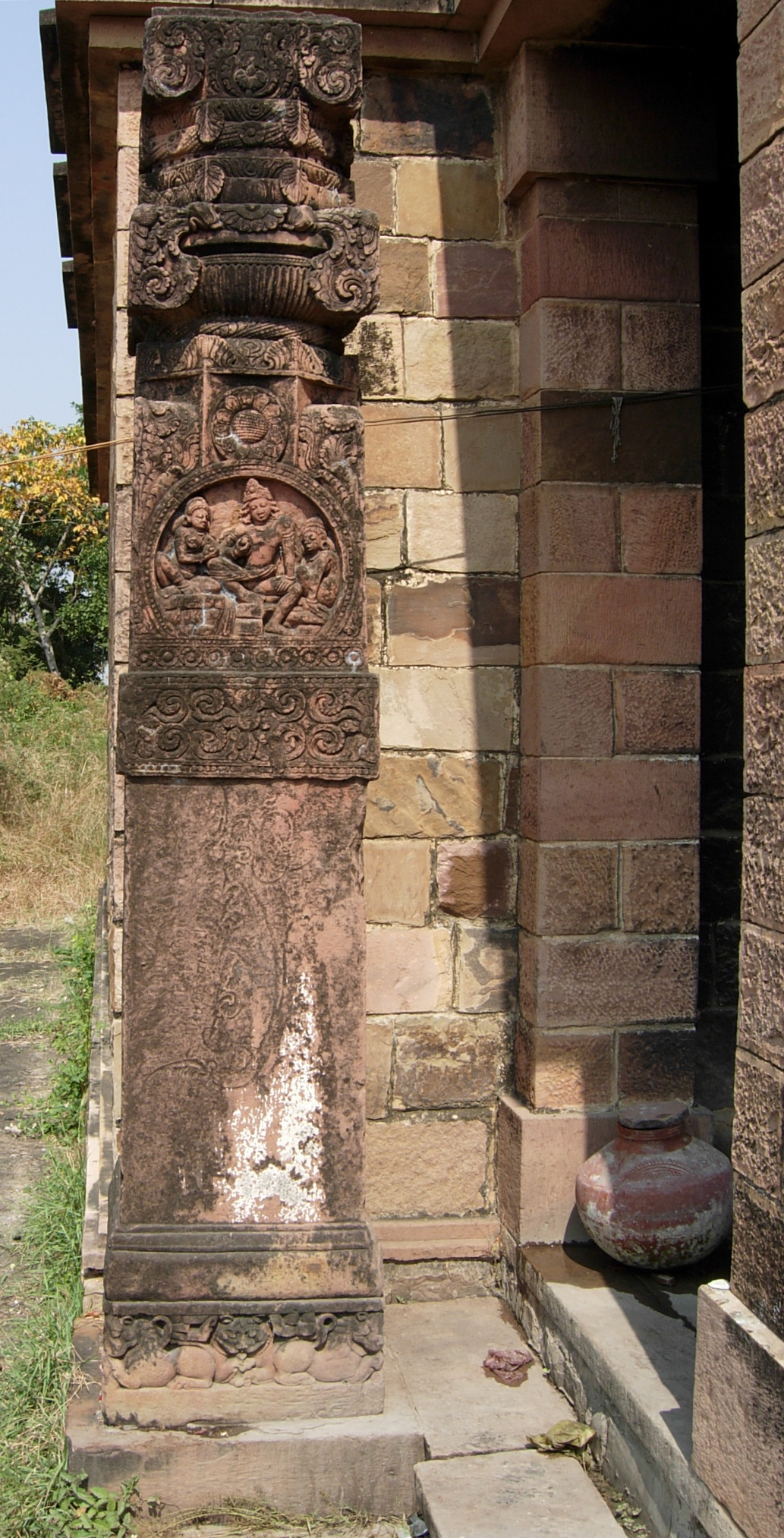
Pillar at Deogarh (Lalitpur district) engraved with Brāhmī and shell inscriptions
