= Ring of stone =

A ring of stone or stone ring or variation, may refer to:

== Structures and geomorphology ==
- stone circle (disambiguation), various large circular rings made of stone arrangements
- Ring of Stones, a 1656 shipwreck marker near Perth, WA, Australia
- Ring of Stone, castlework fortifications barrier used to conquer the Welsh by the English
- stone ring, a type of naturally occurring patterned ground
- kerb or ring of stone, used for gallery graves

== Other uses ==
- Ring (jewelry), made of stone, or precious stones
- ringstone, artefacts made of stone in the shape of rings

== See also ==
- Stone (disambiguation)
- Ring (disambiguation)
- Henge, neolithic structures
