= Stone circle (disambiguation) =

A stone circle is a ring of standing stones.

Stone circle may also refer to:

== Structures ==
- Stone circle (Iron Age)
- Stone circles (Hong Kong)
- Senegambian stone circles
- some Australian Aboriginal stone arrangements
  - Eneabba Stone Arrangement (Circle of Stones), near Leeman, WA, Australia
- Ring of Stones (a.k.a. Circle of Stones), a 1656 shipwreck marker near Perth, WA, Australia

== Other uses ==
- The Stone Circle, a novel by Elly Griffiths

== See also ==
- List of stone circles
- Henge, neolithic structures
- Circlestone, Arizona, US; an indigenous structure
- Ring of stone (disambiguation)
