= Kokasandesam =

Kokasandesam (also known as Chakravaka Sandesam) is an early 15th-century Manipravalam message poem (Sandesha Kavyam) from Kerala, India. Composed by an anonymous author, it is heavily modeled after Kalidasa's classic Sanskrit masterpiece, the Meghadūta ("The Cloud Messenger").

== Plot ==
The narrative centers on a love-lorn protagonist (the hero) who is separated from his beloved (the heroine). While resting near the temple pond of the Thriprangode Siva Temple (located in modern-day Malappuram district), the hero falls into a dream. In this dream, he requests a Chakravaka bird (a ruddy shelduck, traditionally called Koka in Sanskrit) to fly south and deliver a message of love to his wife, who is asleep at their home in Kollam (historically known as Desinganadu)..

== Age & Author ==
From the vivid description of the Trikkanamathilakkam, it can be inferred that the period of the message is before its fall. Ulloor says that the Kokasandesham is as old as the Unnu Neelisandesham or a little older and may have originated at least in the latter half of the fourteenth century.. Although Thiruvanchikulam is described in detail in 17 verses, it is not said that if you go there, you will see Perumpadapmuoppan, except that it is indicated that it was under the rule of Madamannan. Ilamkulam Kunjanpillai also suggests that the time must have been after 1405, when the headquarters of the Perumpadapmuswarupam was shifted from Thiruvanchikulam to Kochi. He concludes that the time of the Kokasandesham is around 1400.
