= Gudimallam Lingam =

Ancient Shiva linga in Gudimallam Andhra Pradesh

Coordinates: 13.603425°N 79.576767°E

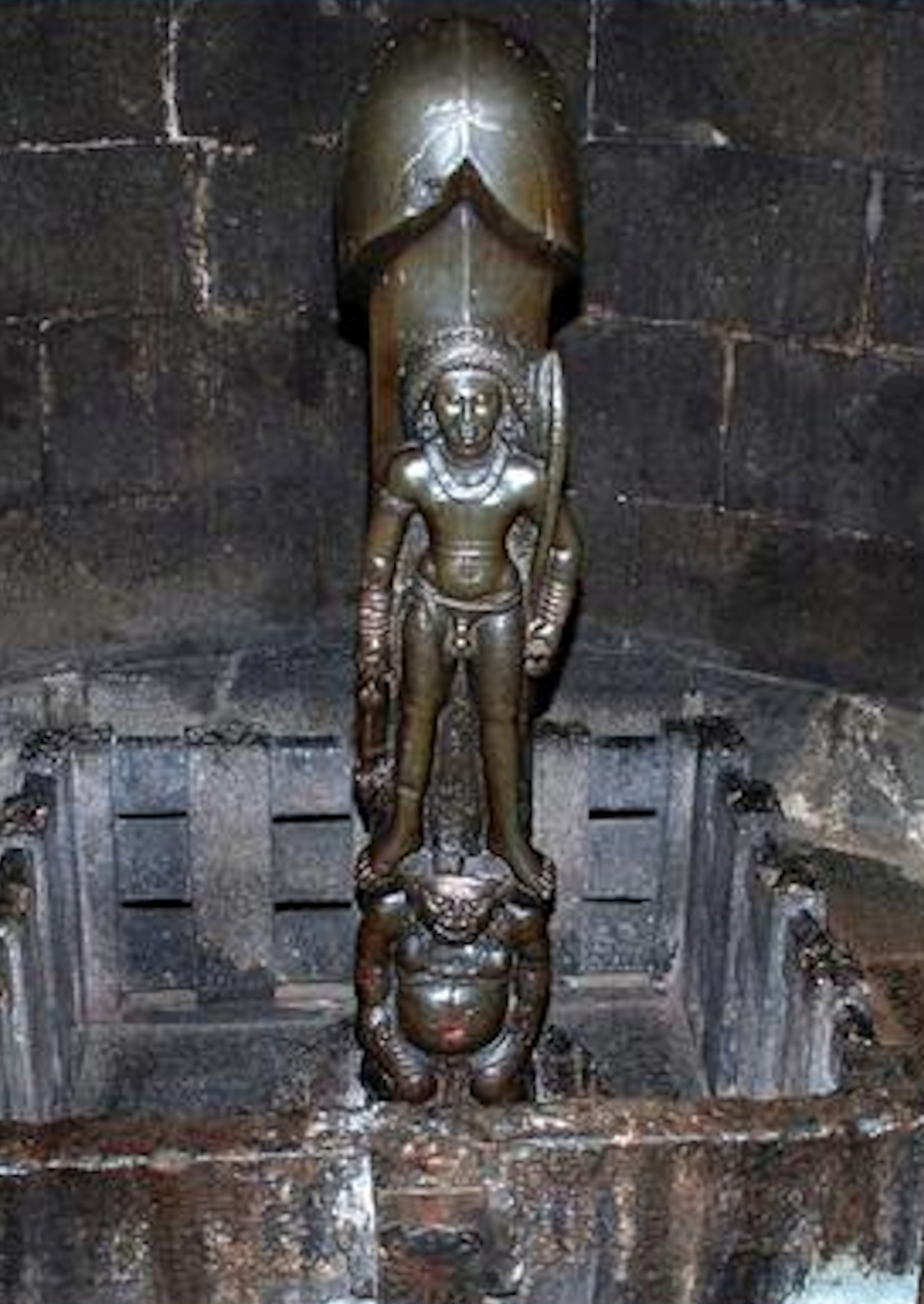
- The Gudimallam Lingam in-situ
- Discovered: Gudimallam

Location

The Gudimallam Lingam is an ancient linga in the Parashurameshwara Swami Temple of Gudimallam, a small village near Tirupati city in the Yerpedu mandal of the Tirupati district of Andhra Pradesh, India. It is situated about 24 kilometres (15 mi) south-east of Tirupati city.

Though Gudimallam is a small village, it is well known because it has a very early linga that is unmistakably phallic in shape, with a full-length standing relief figure of Shiva carved on the front. This is in the garbhagriha of the Parasurameswara Temple, Hindu temple dedicated to Shiva. This is perhaps the second earliest linga associated with Shiva discovered so far, and it has been dated to the 2nd/1st century BC, or the 3rd century BC, or much later, to the 2nd century AD, 3-4th century AD,

According to Harle, this is "the only sculpture of any importance" to survive from ancient South India before sculpture made under the Pallava dynasty from the 7th century AD onwards, and "its mysteriousness lies in the total absence so far of any object in an even remotely similar manner within many hundreds of miles, and indeed anywhere in South India". If assigned an early date, the figure on the linga is "one of the earliest surviving and unequivocal images of the god Shiva".

The temple is later than the linga; again, estimates of its age vary considerably, but the existing building is usually dated to "the later Chola and Vijayanagara periods", so possibly a thousand years later than the sculpture; it seems to have replaced much earlier structures. The linga was possibly originally sited in the open air, with the rectangular stone surround that still remains, or inside a wooden structure. The temple remains in worship, but has been protected by the Archaeological Survey of India (ASI) since 1954.

== Description ==
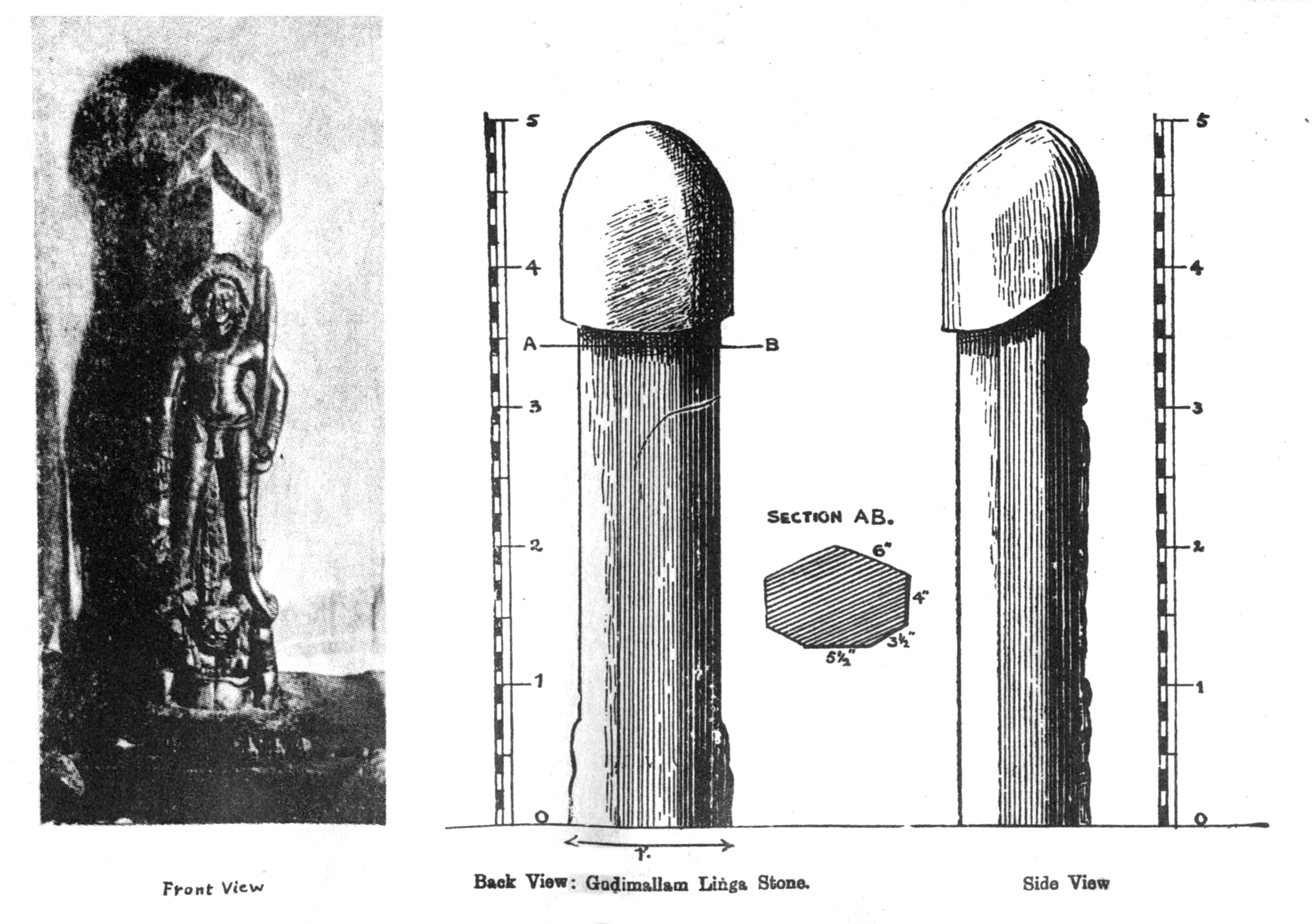
Gudimallam lingam (as it appeared before the floor was lowered): front, rear & side elevations, with sectional plan.

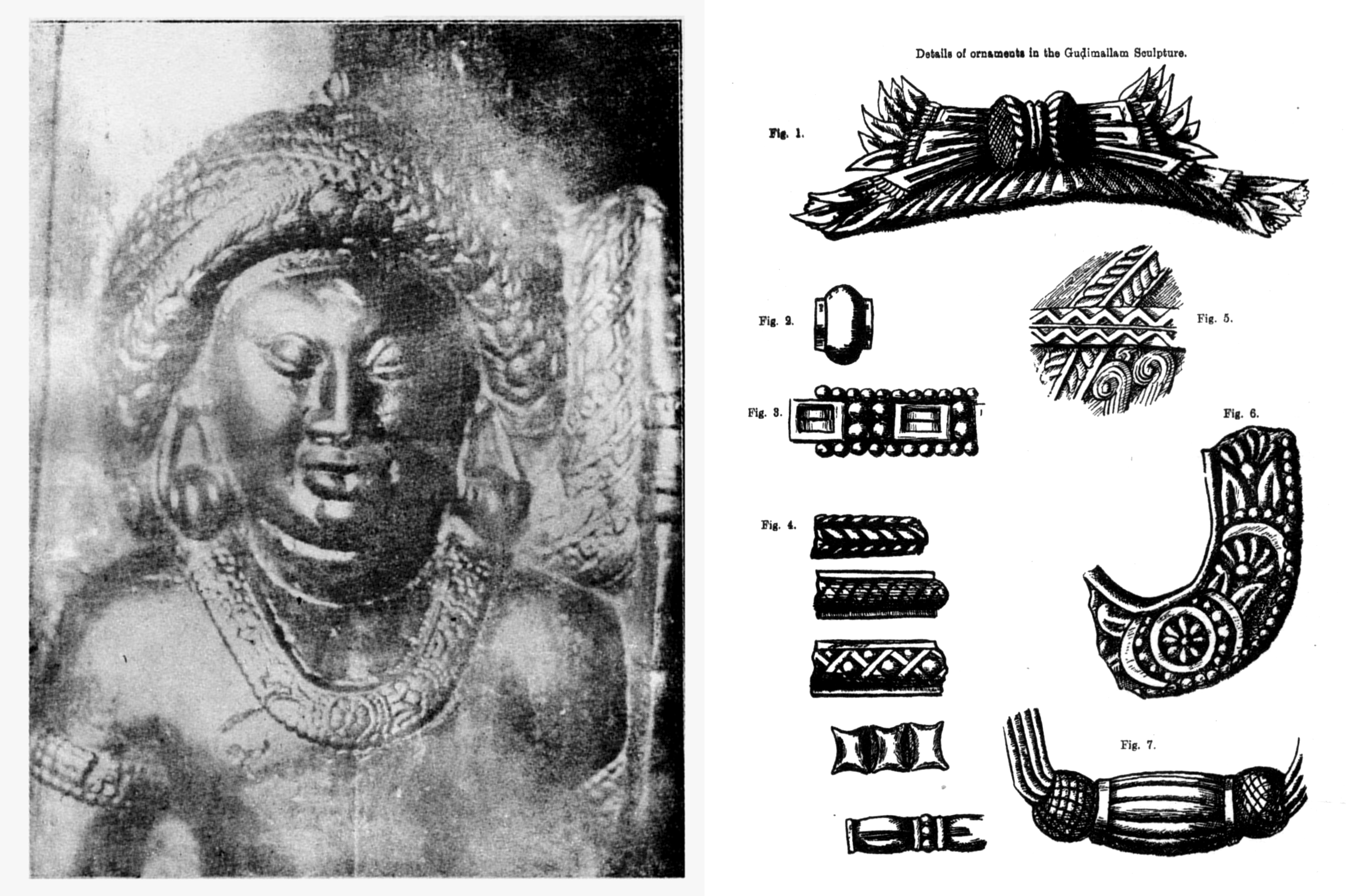
Gudimallam statue details

The linga first came to academic attention, by his own account, after being surveyed by the archaeologist T. A. Gopinatha Rao (then working for the local princely state, later with the ASI), "some years" before he published it in 1911. The linga is carved out of a hard dark brown local stone. It is over 5 ft high and slightly above a foot in diameter on the main shaft. Rao gives the height as 5 foot exactly, but did not see the full length, as the bottom of the linga was then buried in the floor. The glans penis is clearly differentiated from the shaft by being wider, with a deep slanting groove cut about a foot from the top of the Linga. Unusually, the garbhagriha is apsidal or semi-circular, curving behind the linga, which is called Gaja Prushta vasthu or resembling the rear portion of an elephant.

An image of Shiva in sthanaka posture is carved in high relief. On the front portion of the linga the god is standing on the shoulders of a figure of Apasmara, a dwarf who represents spiritual ignorance. The figure of Shiva resembles a vigorous hunter; He holds a ram or antelope in his right hand and a small water pot in his left hand. There is a battle axe (parasu) resting on his left shoulder. He wears many heavy earrings, an elaborate flat necklace, and a girdle with a dangling central portion. His arms are adorned with five bracelets, with different designs in relief, on each wrist, and a high arm ring on each side. He wears a dhoti of very thin material, fastened at his waist with a vastra-mekhala. This extends round the whole shaft of the linga. He has no yagnopavita or sacred thread. Emerging from a complicated turban-like head-covering, his hair is long and plaited (not matted).

His features are described by Rao as Mongoloid, and Blurton describes the figure as not having "the features associated with gods of orthodox Hinduism" but "squat and broadly-built, and with the thick curly hair and the pronounced lips still seen amongst tribal populations in Central India", suggesting the non-Vedic aspects being absorbed into the emerging figure of Shiva.

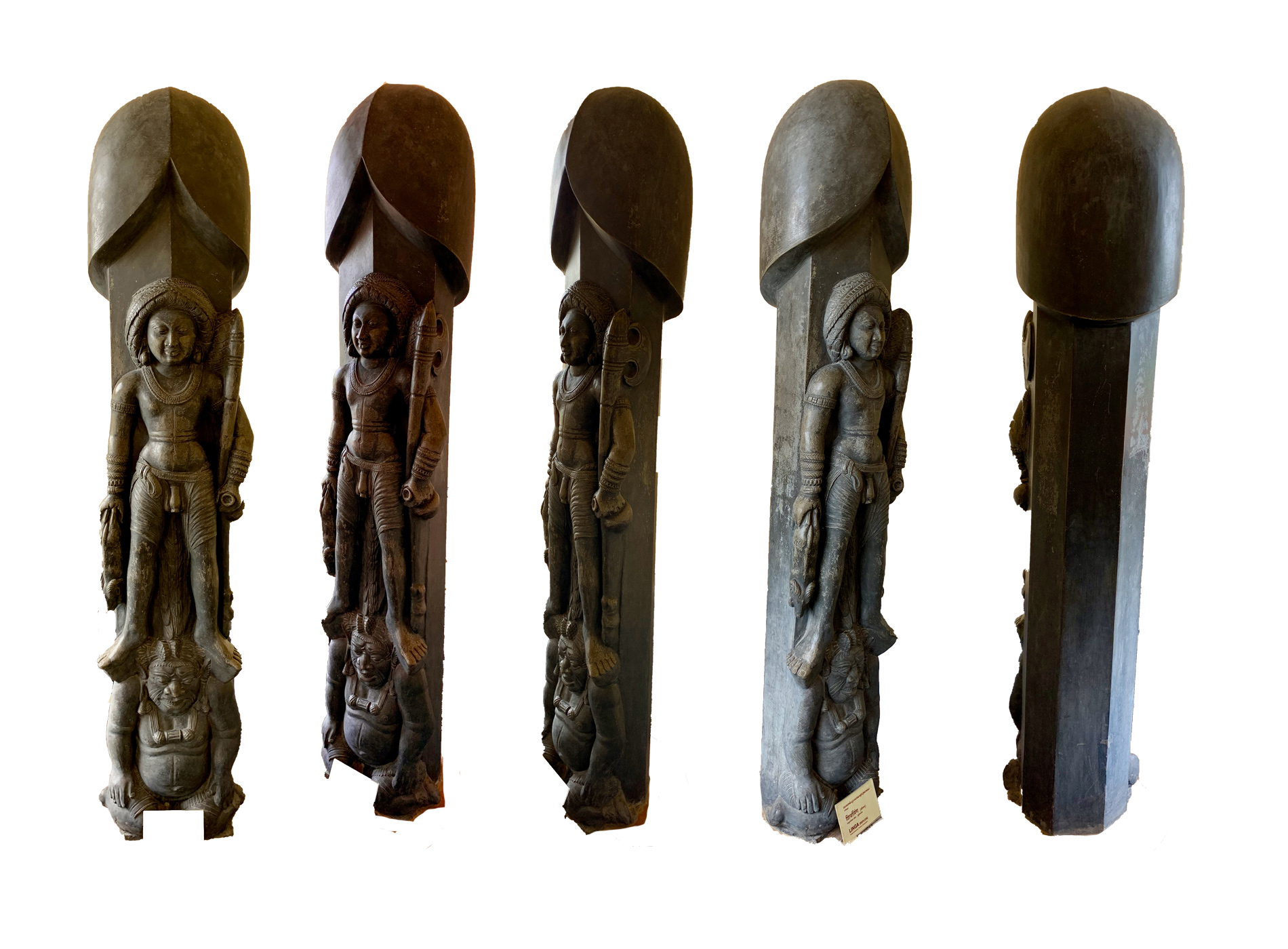
Views from different angles of a replica of relatively recent date

Rao's account emphasizes that the linga here is unmistakably a representation of an erect human penis, as therefore are other Shiva lingas, this point having apparently been disputed, or overgeneralized, by some previously. He describes it as "shaped exactly like the original model, in a state of erection", though one of his illustrations shows the "plan" section of the shaft, with seven straight-line faces, and gives their unequal lengths. The sharpest angle made by these faces would run through the centre of the Shiva figure, and the front face of the linga is made of the two longest faces (at 6 inches). Two side faces of 4 inches are at right angles to the figure, and the rear of the shaft has one central longer face at right angles to the sides, and two shorter ones joining the back and sides.

Early lingam often have shafts with several straight sides, but more often eight rather than the seven here. Their structure signifies the earth in the square base, the air in the shaft section, and the sky in the rounded top. The same symbolism appears in Buddhist stupas.

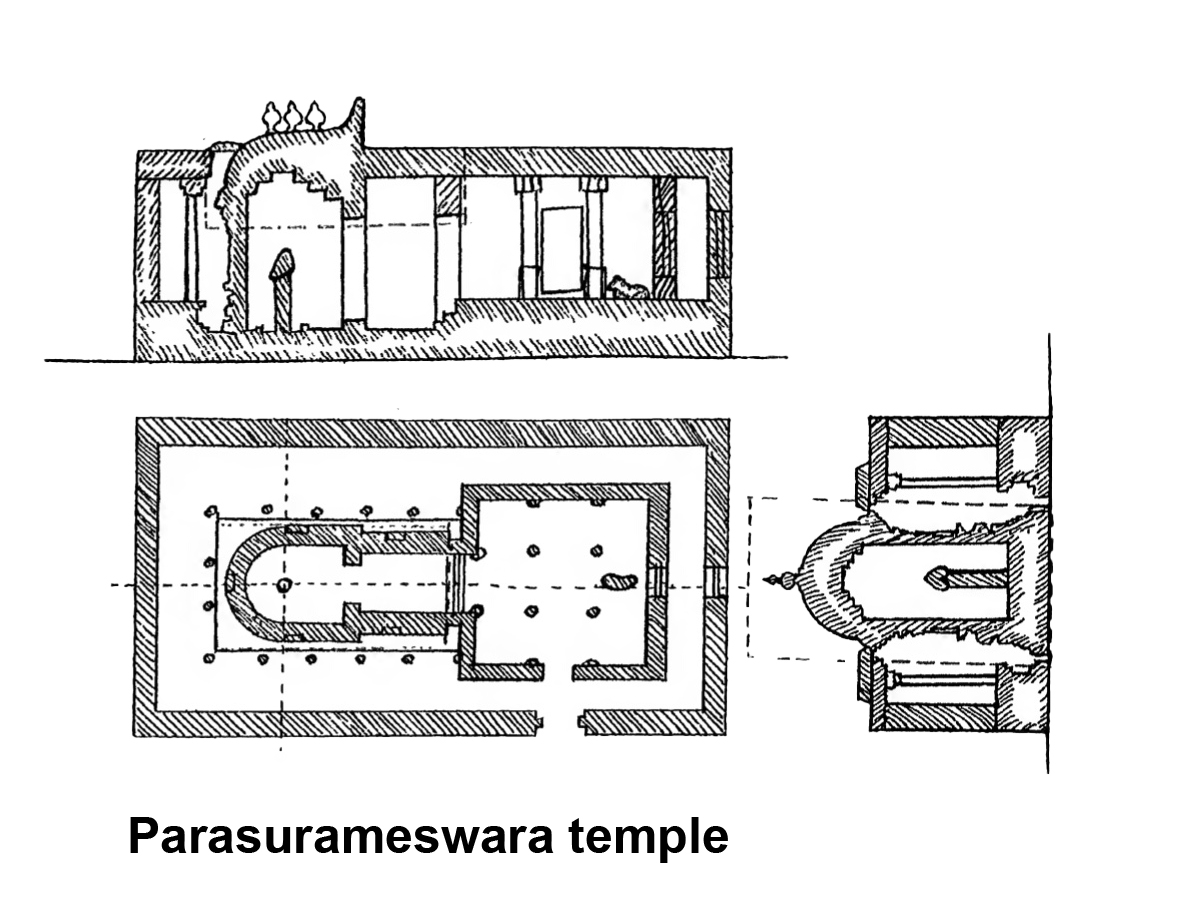
Plan and elevation of the temple

== Setting ==
Though the linga has remained in worship in the temple built around it, its relationship to the sanctuary and setting has been altered since Rao's time. The photograph in Rao's 1916 book, like the one at the top of the article, shows the linga set into the floor, which comes at about the level of the dwarf's midriff. More recent photos and videos, presumably taken after an ASI exploration in 1973–74, show the lingam in a square stone enclosure on the floor, with the whole length of the dwarf (who is kneeling) visible, as well as a circular pediment.

The stone slabs making the enclosure are plain on the outside, but carved on the inside as stone railings (with three horizontal rails) in a pattern comparable to those of ancient Buddhist stupas such as Sanchi (but much smaller). Rao was unaware of this structure, then below the floor, saying "the pedestal is cut out in the form of a quadrangular ridge on the ground", this ridge in fact being the top of the uppermost rail of the railings. Whether the rest of the floor was lowered or the linga and railings raised is unclear; the sanctuary floor is now a few steps below the main floor level of the temple, an unusual feature which Rao's plan of the temple from 1911 shows, but does not give measurements for. The linga also has a modern golden metal frame, topped by a naga head, behind it.

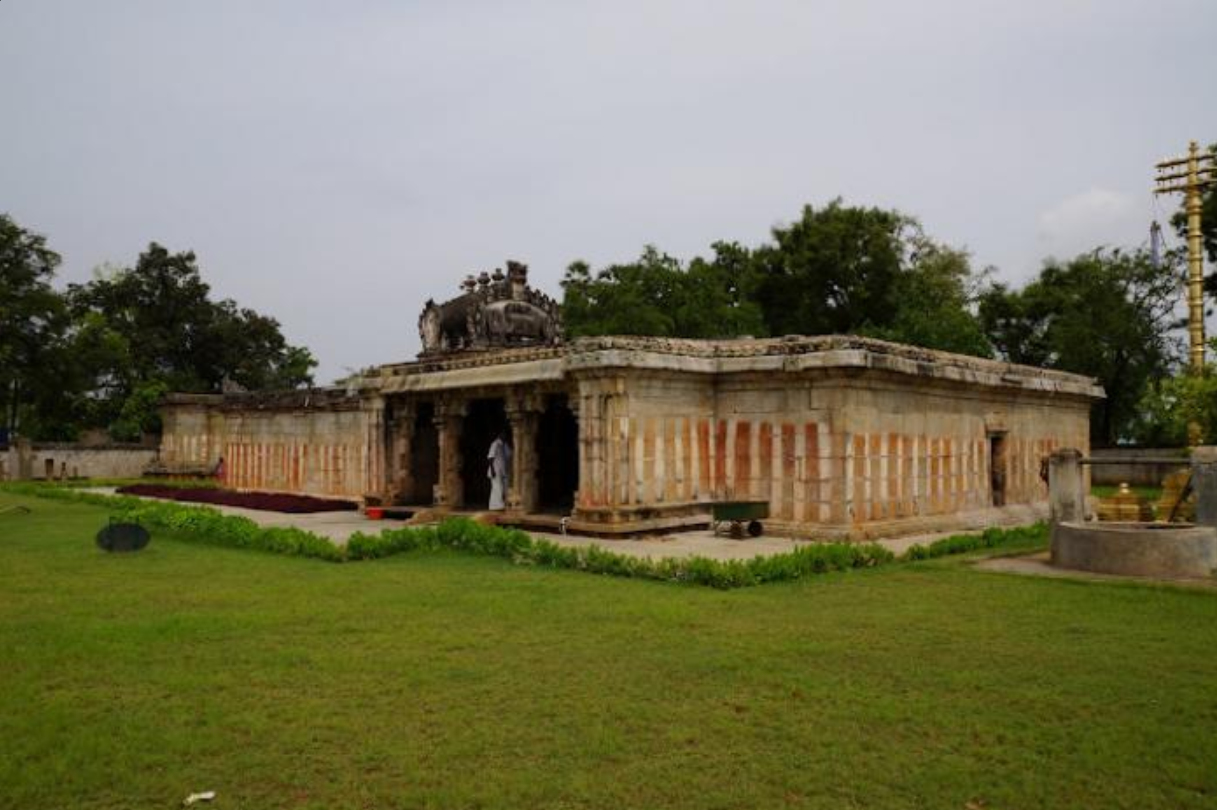
Gudimallam Temple

Sources disagree about the expression and connotations of the "dwarf" below Shiva. To Rao he is "jolly and happy, as is evidenced by the broad grin on his face". He has "pointed animal ears". For Elgood, he is a "yaksha with fish-shaped feet and conch-shaped ears", so a spirit connected with water, matching the water pot held by Shiva (Rao would never have seen these feet). Shiva conventionally stands on such a figure in much later depictions of him as Nataraja ("Lord of the Dance"), where the figure is usually said to represent "ignorance", but in the earliest Indian stone monumental sculpture, figures often stand on dwarfish figures, as with (for example) the Bhutesvara Yakshis (Buddhist, 2nd century AD), where these figures also seem rather cheerful.

Karthikeya Sharma, who conducted the ASI excavations, states that the Gudimallam Linga combines several later aspects of Siva; for example, the God's eyes focusing on the tip of his nose indicates the Virupaksha (kingly) and Yoga-Dakshina-murthi (supreme guru) aspects of later years. The holding of a ram in his right hand indicates the Bhikshatana-murthi aspect of Siva as supreme mendicant or beggar.

== Context ==
Rao's account emphasizes that the linga here is unmistakably a representation of an erect human penis; he describes it as "shaped exactly like the original model, in a state of erection". However, Stella Kramrisch cautions against interpreting the Gudimallam lingam as a motif of fertility or sexuality; the ithyphallic representation connotes the very opposite in this context — Urdhva Retas i.e. the ascent of vital energy (controlled by semen) rather than release. The physical passions are renounced into mental faculties, as one journeys to ananda, moksha, and samādhi, through the path of Brahmacarya.

== History of the temple and site ==
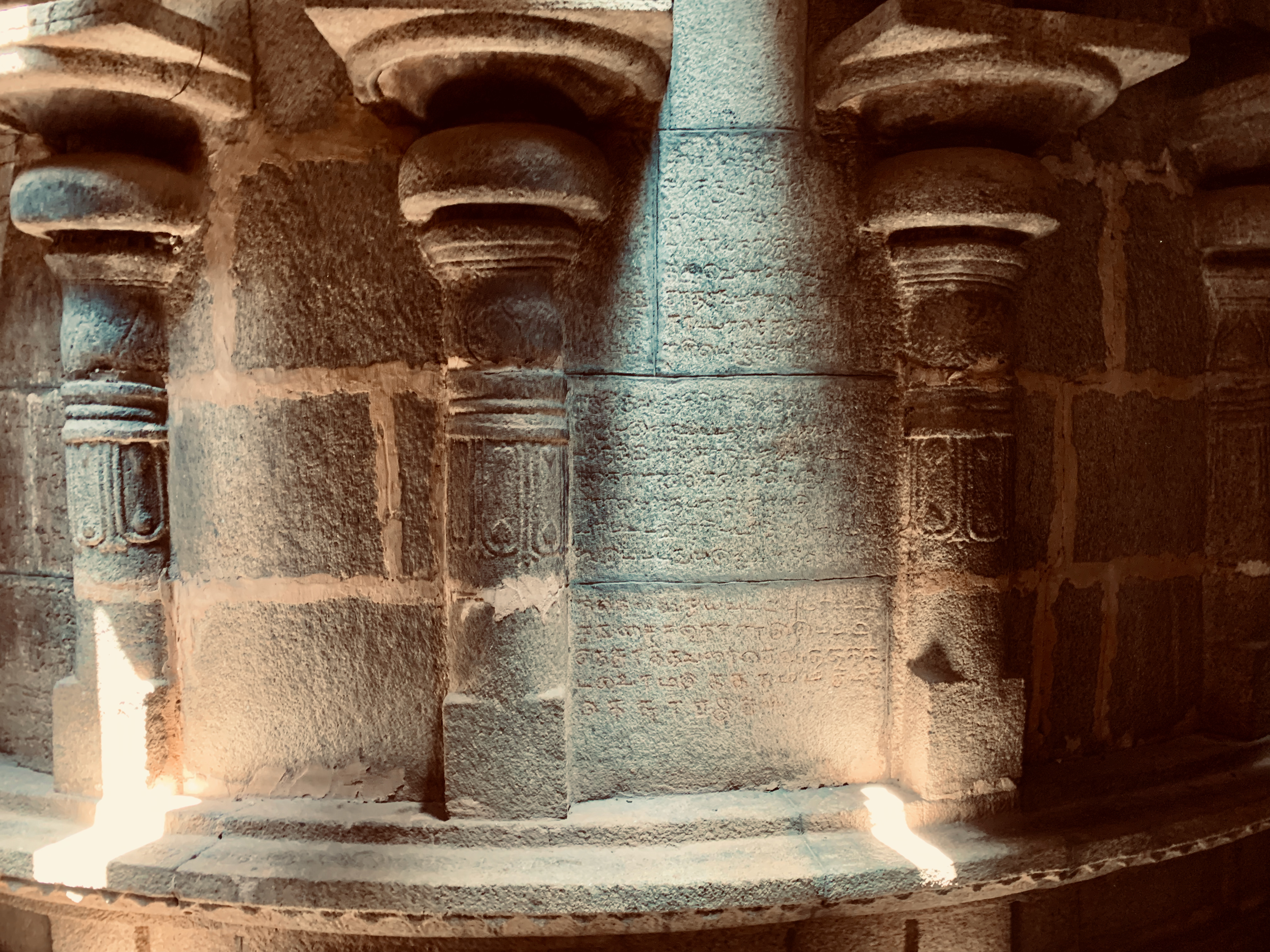
The main shrine is apsidal, with the outer wall inscribed in different scripts. These inscriptions describe donations to the temple over the centuries. The temple shows evidence of various reconstructions and expansions.

The name of the temple is mentioned as Parasurameswara Temple in the inscriptions. These inscriptions do not refer to the original builders of the temple. But they register the gifts made to the temple like land, money and cows for the conduct of daily worship in the temple. Black and Redware sherds of the 2nd or 3rd century AD have been brought to light during the course of excavations conducted in 1973. Potsherds of the Andhra Satavahana period (Circa 1st century AD to 2nd century AD) and large sized bricks measuring 42x21x6 inches of the same period have also been found. Hence some historians assign the temple to the Satavahana period.

The sanctum of the Parasurameswara Swamy temple has a square plan embedded in an apsidal structure. According to Himanshu Ray, this apsidal design attests to a more ancient temple architecture made of perishable materials. The later restorations rebuilt on the earlier design.

Historians disagree about the political history and the name of this place. There are several inscriptions which date to the Pallava, Yadava Devarayalu, Ganga Pallava, Bana and Chola periods on the walls of the shrine and on stone slabs in the temple courtyard. The earliest inscription belongs to the reign of Nandivarma Pallava (802 AD). All the inscriptions mention the keen interest taken by the donors and their gifts to the Temple. However, none of the inscriptions give the village name as Gudimallam.

== Comparisons for the lingam ==
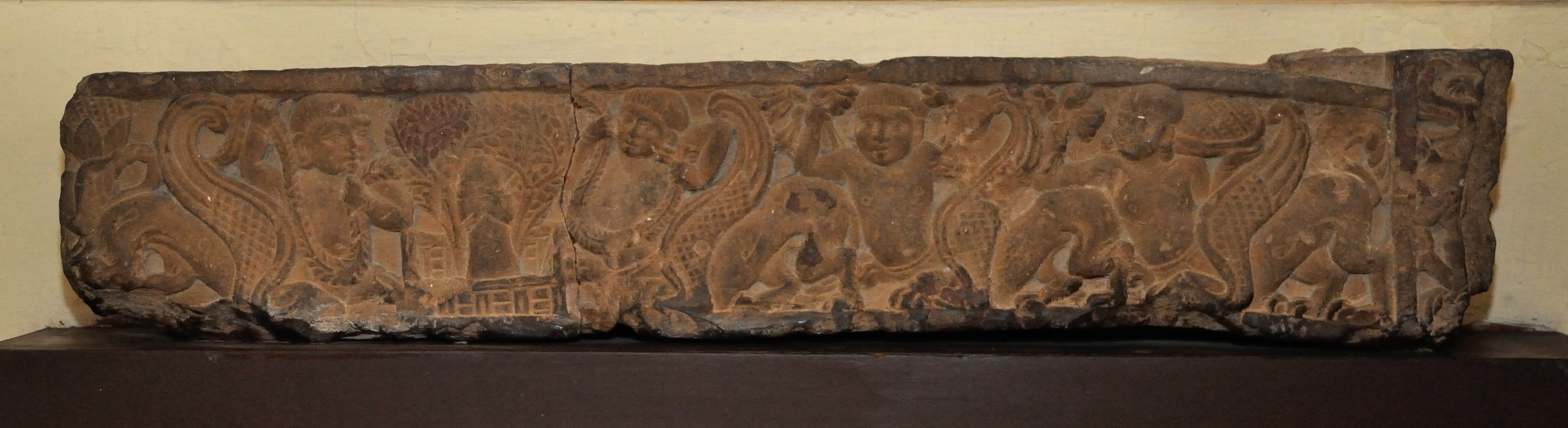
Relief from Bhuteshwar in the Mathura Museum, showing worship of a phallic limgam, set in an enclosure with railings. Shunga period

Some of the copper coins obtained at Ujjain and belonging to the 3rd century BC contain figures which resemble the Linga of Gudimallam. A 1st century sculpture in the Mathura Museum also contains a figure resembling the Gudimallam Shiva. J.N. Benerjee in his work Religion in art and archaeology observes:

The Lingam in Arghya motif was comparatively late phase. In the course of its conventionalisation and development, the Arghya was supposed to symbolise the female part and it was described, in many late texts of a tantric character. But originally in comparatively early times, the emblems of the male and the female deities were worshiped separately, as the earliest specimens of the phallus and ring stone testify. The Gudimallam Shiva Linga or for that matter the Shivalingas of the Pre-Gupta and the early Gupta periods did not show any real base in the shape of the latter characterization of the arghya or pita. Even in latter representations of the emblem, the projecting section of the Pita really served the very useful purpose of draining off the water profusely poured on the top of the Shiva Linga to some distance from its base. This statement needs revision, for it is evident from the recent excavations conducted by the Archaeological Survey of India, South eastern Circle of Hyderabad, clearly revealed that Gudimallam Linga was originally provided with a pedestal.

== Gallery ==
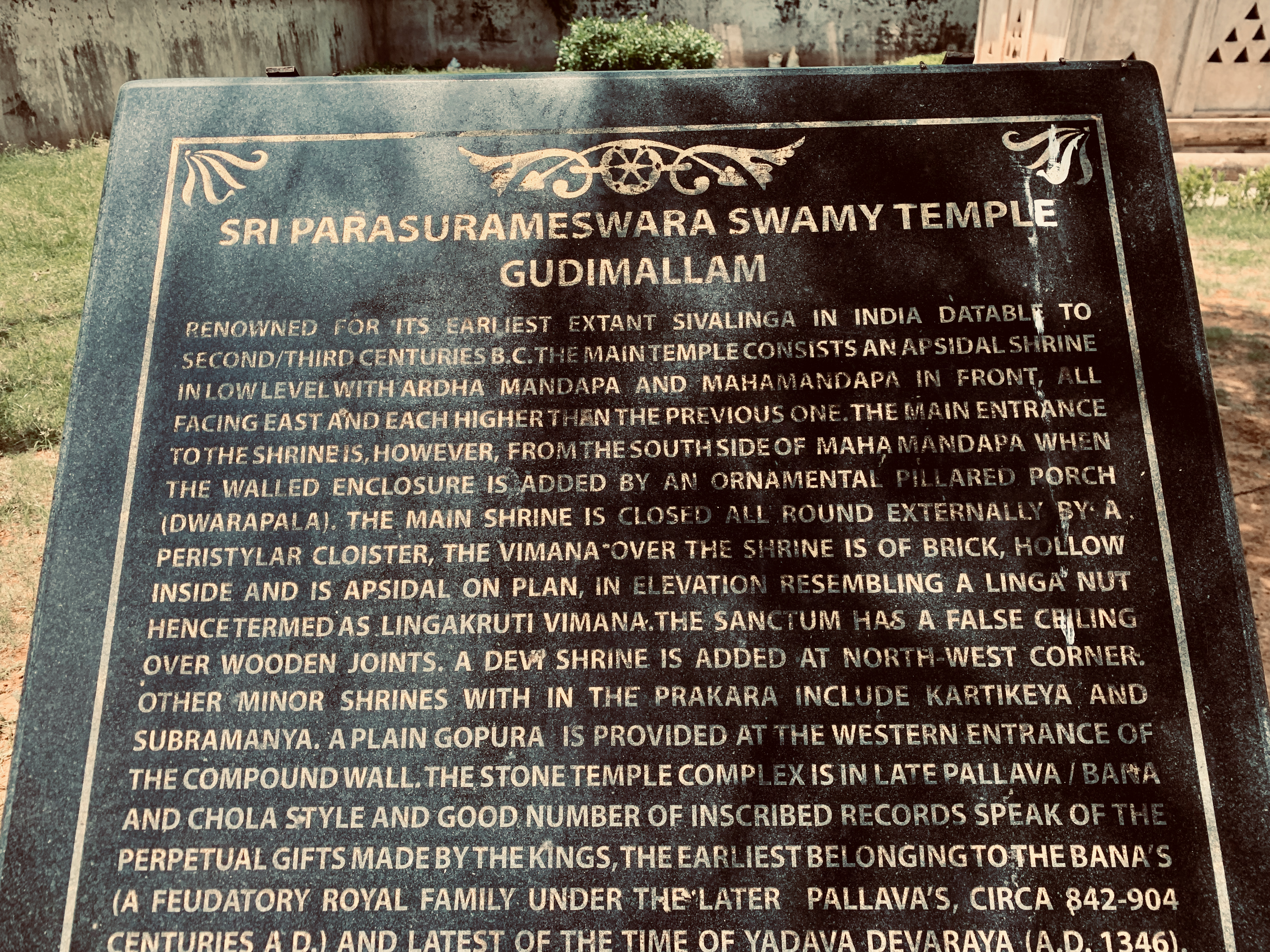
Sign at the temple

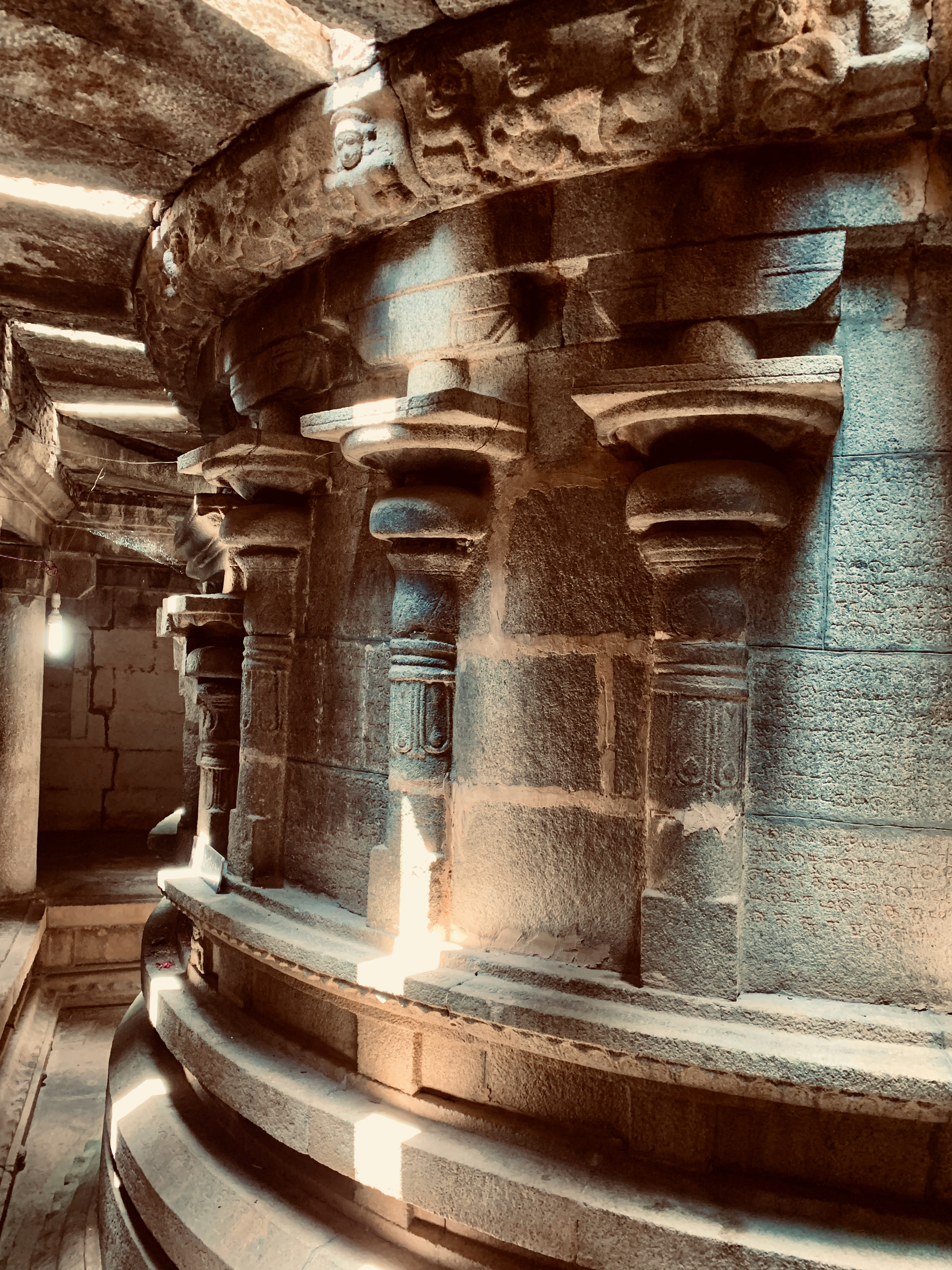
Outside of the apsidal sanctuary

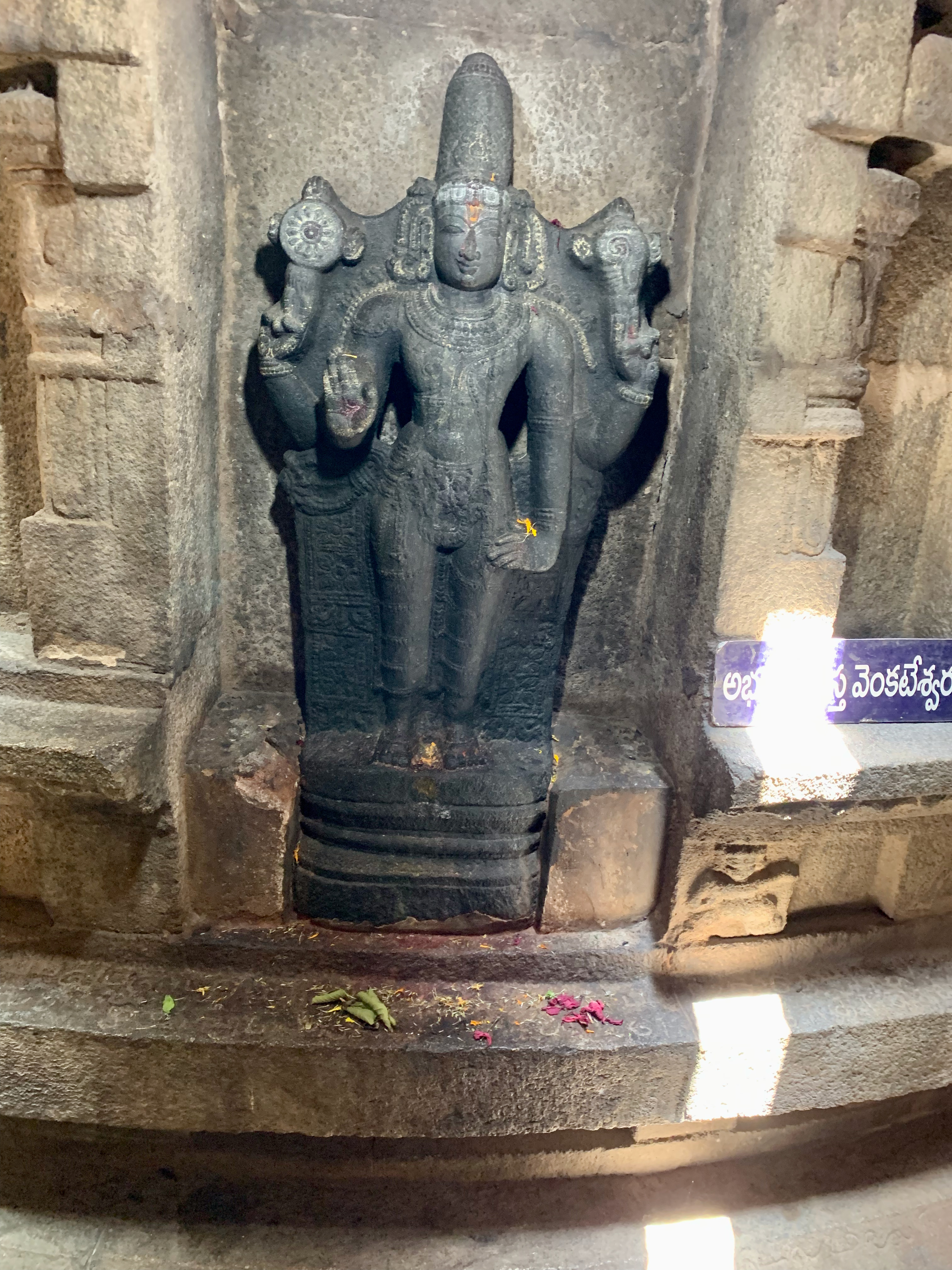
Vishnu

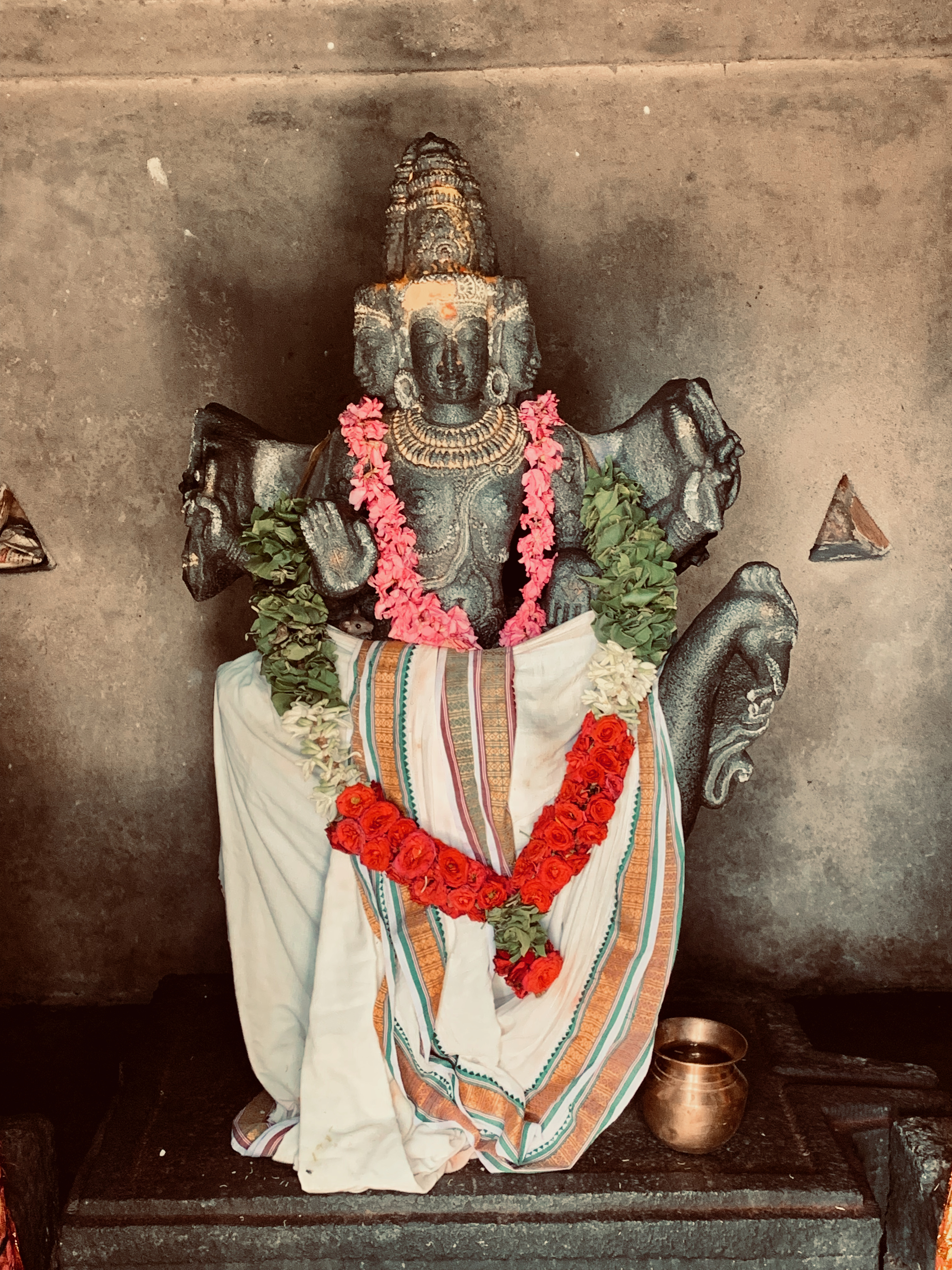
Kartikeya
