= T. A. Gopinatha Rao =

Indian archaeologist and epigraphist

T. A. Gopinatha Rao (1872-1919) was an Indian archaeologist and epigraphist with the Archaeological Survey of India (ASI) who contributed regularly to the journal Epigraphia Indica. He was appointed first Superintendent of the Travancore Archaeology Department in 1908. During his tenure, Rao edited Travancore Archaeological Series volumes 1 and 2.

He noticed and was the first to publish the very important ancient Gudimallam Lingam, clearly phallic in shape and carved with a full-length Shiva. This was in his book Elements of Hindu Iconography 1914, (Law Printing House, Madras)

== Papers ==
- "Painting in Ancient India", Modern Review, 1918, |volume=XXIV

== Gallery ==
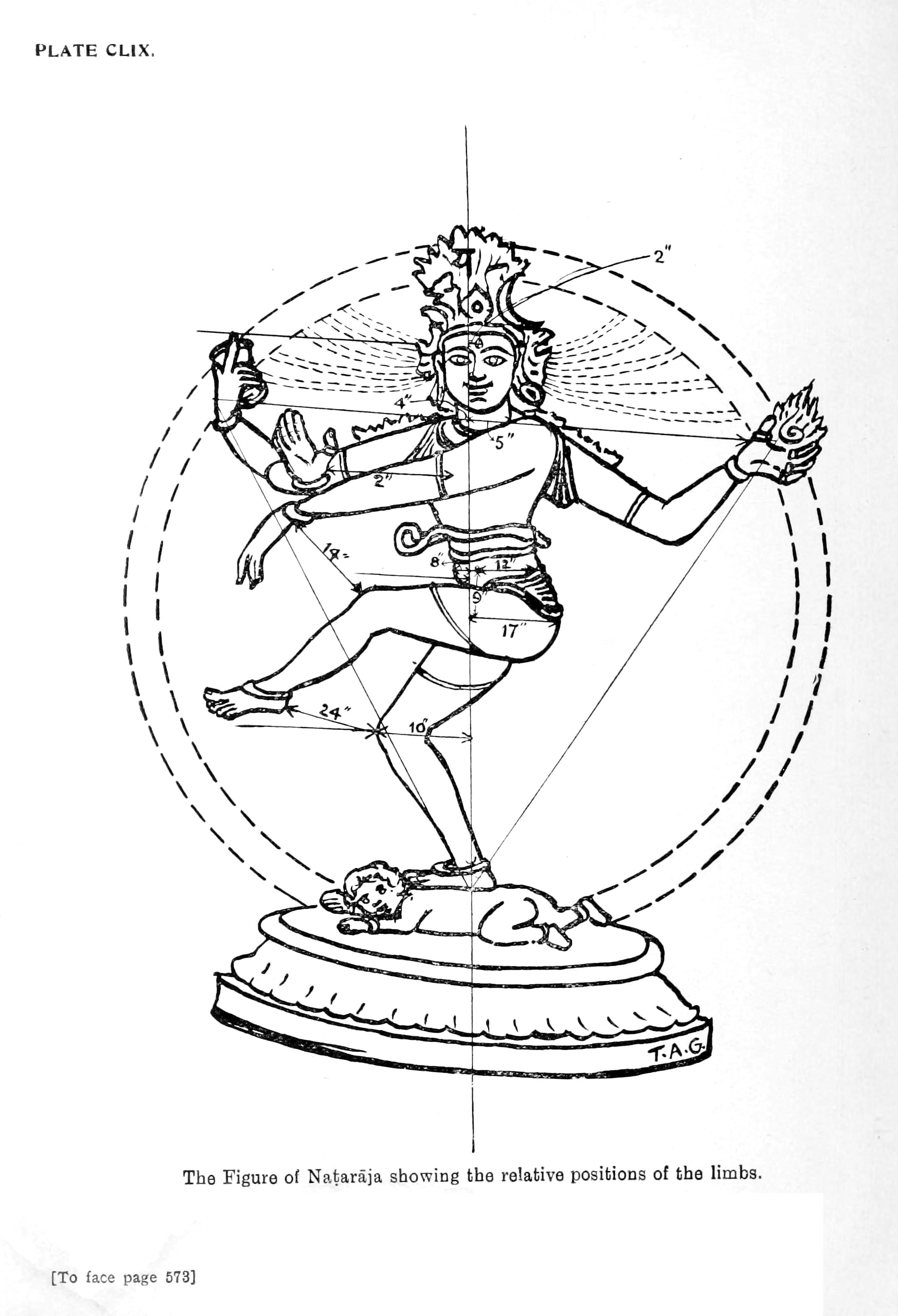
Siva-Nataraja design

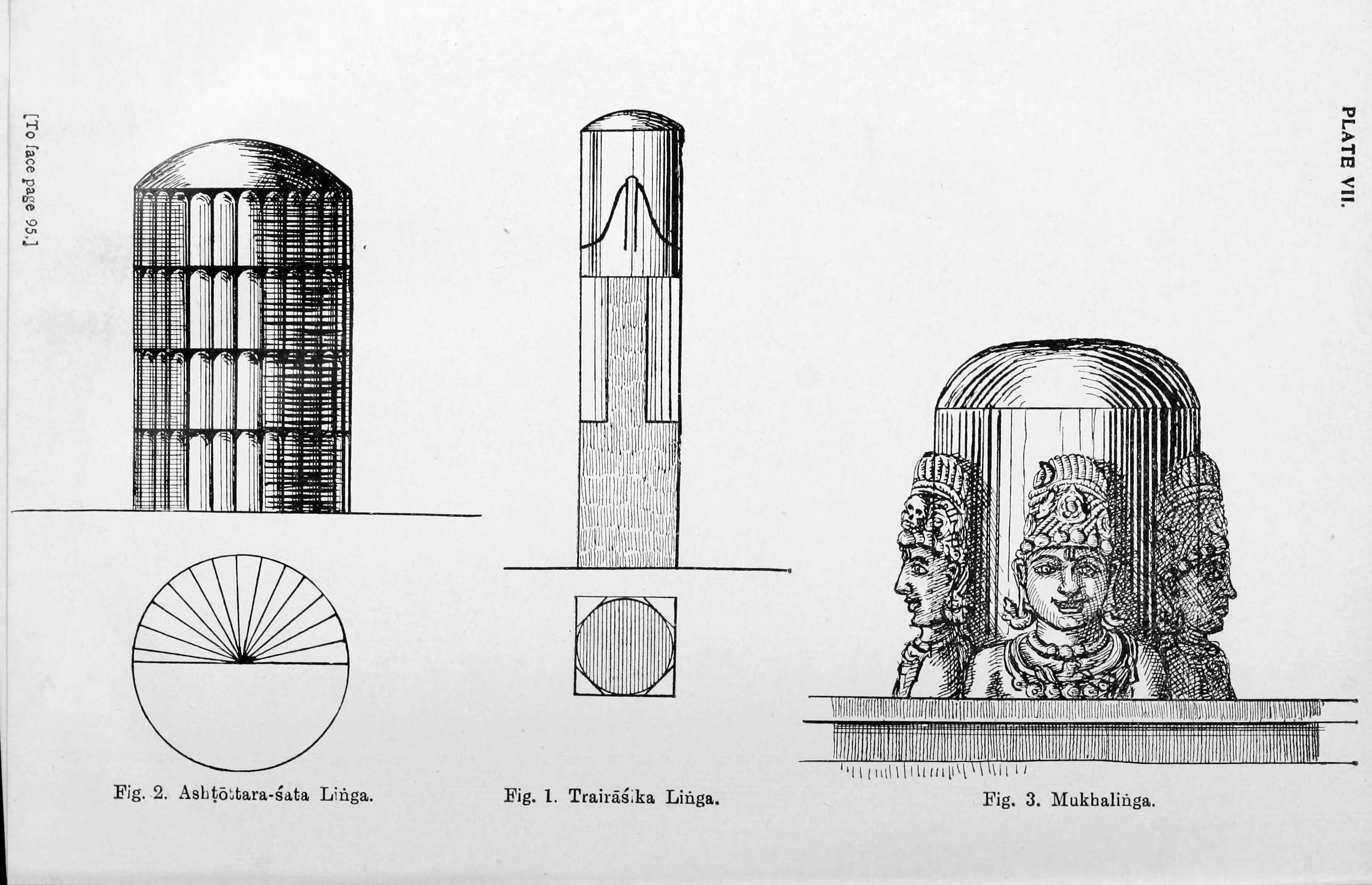
Linga design

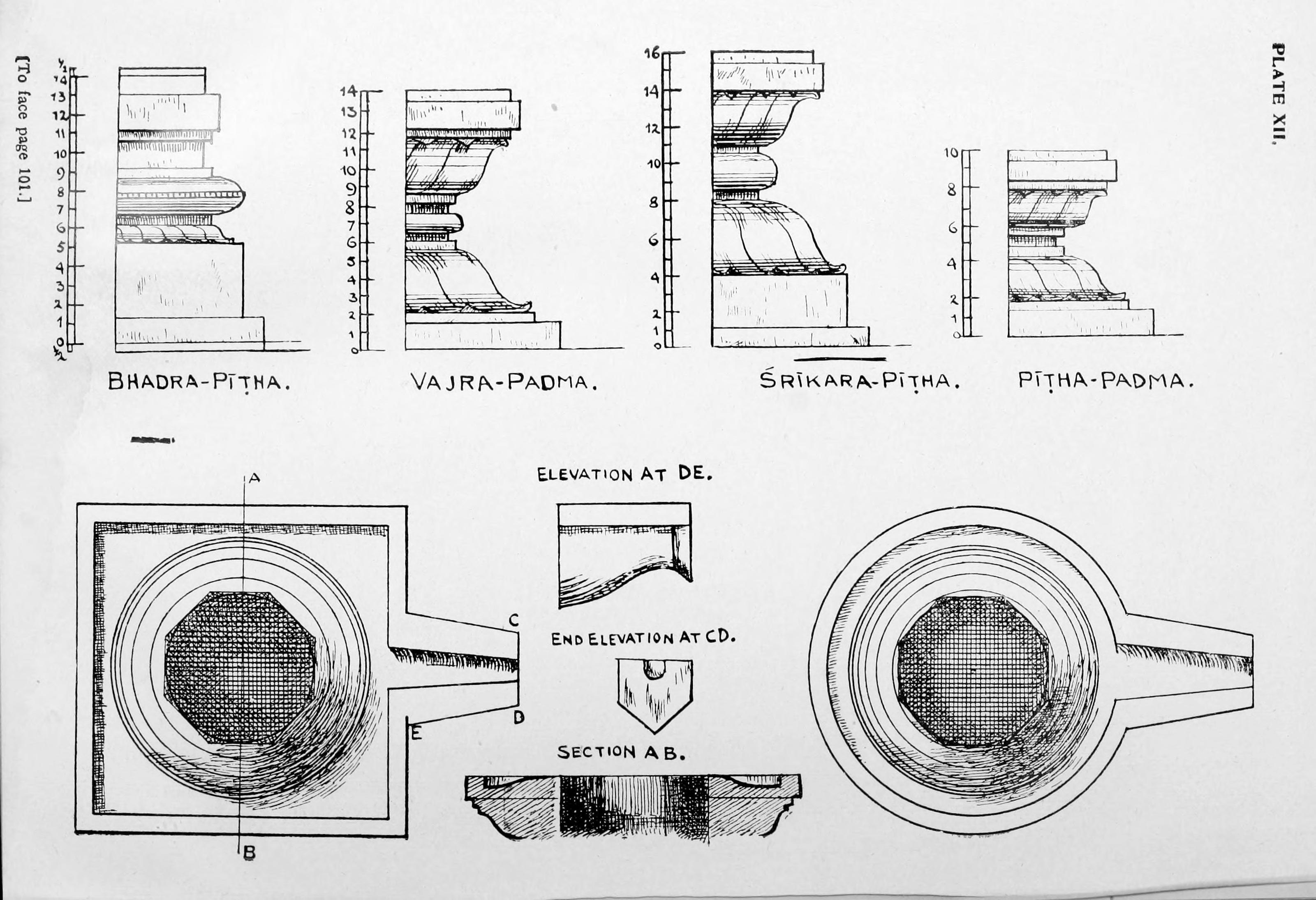
Pitha design

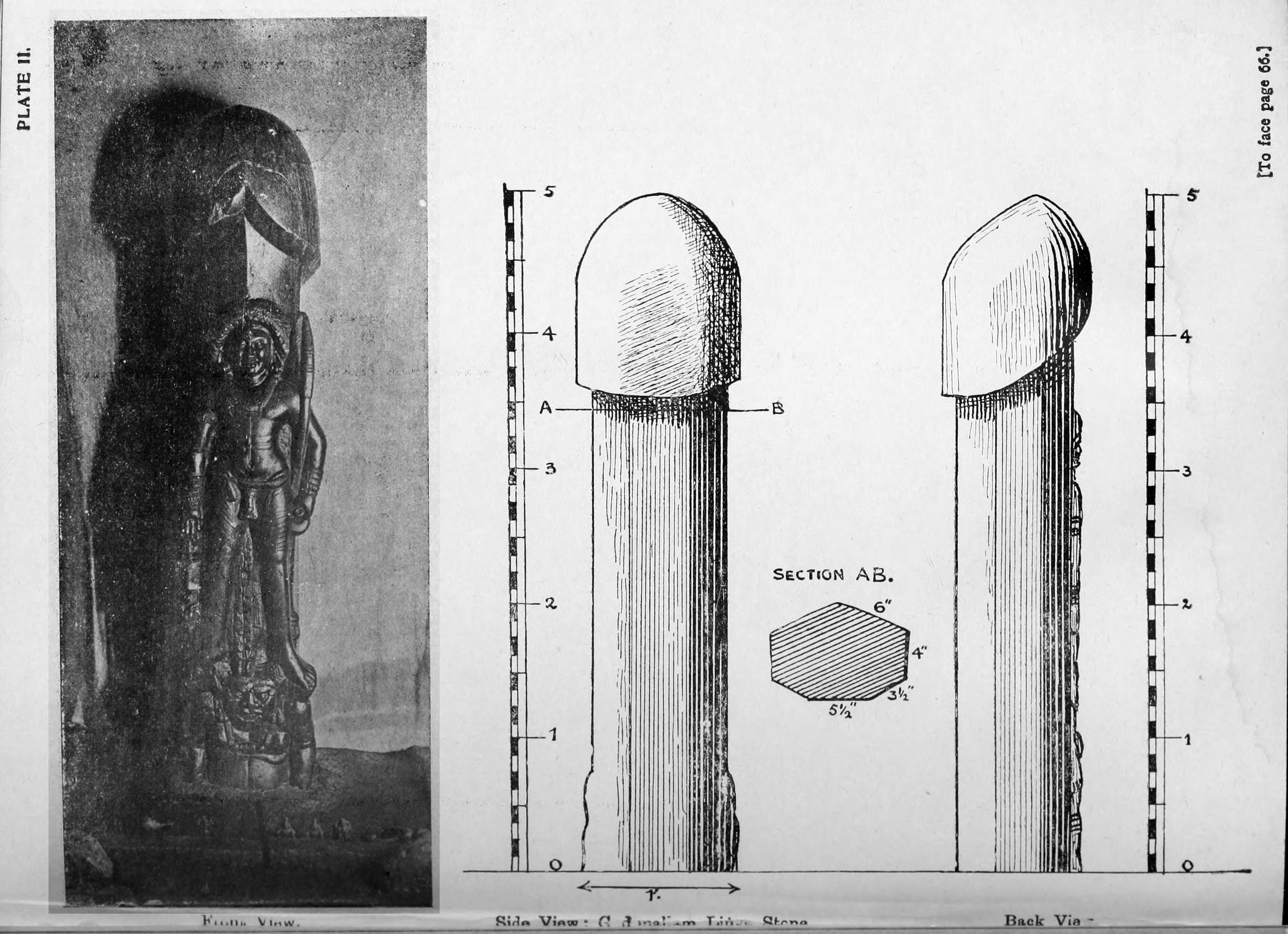
Siva-Linga measurements
