= Gudimallam =

- Village
- Interactive map of Gudimallam
- Location in Andhra Pradesh, India
- Coordinates: 13.586083°N 79.583096°E

Population
  - Total: 2,017

Literacy

Languages
  - Official: Telugu
- Time zone: UTC+5:30 (IST)
- PIN: 517620

Gudimallam is a village near Tirupati, located in Tirupati district of Andhra Pradesh state of India. It is situated about 15 kilometres (9.3 mi) southeast of Tirupati city. It is especially famous for the Gudimallam Lingam in the Parasurameswara Swamy Temple.

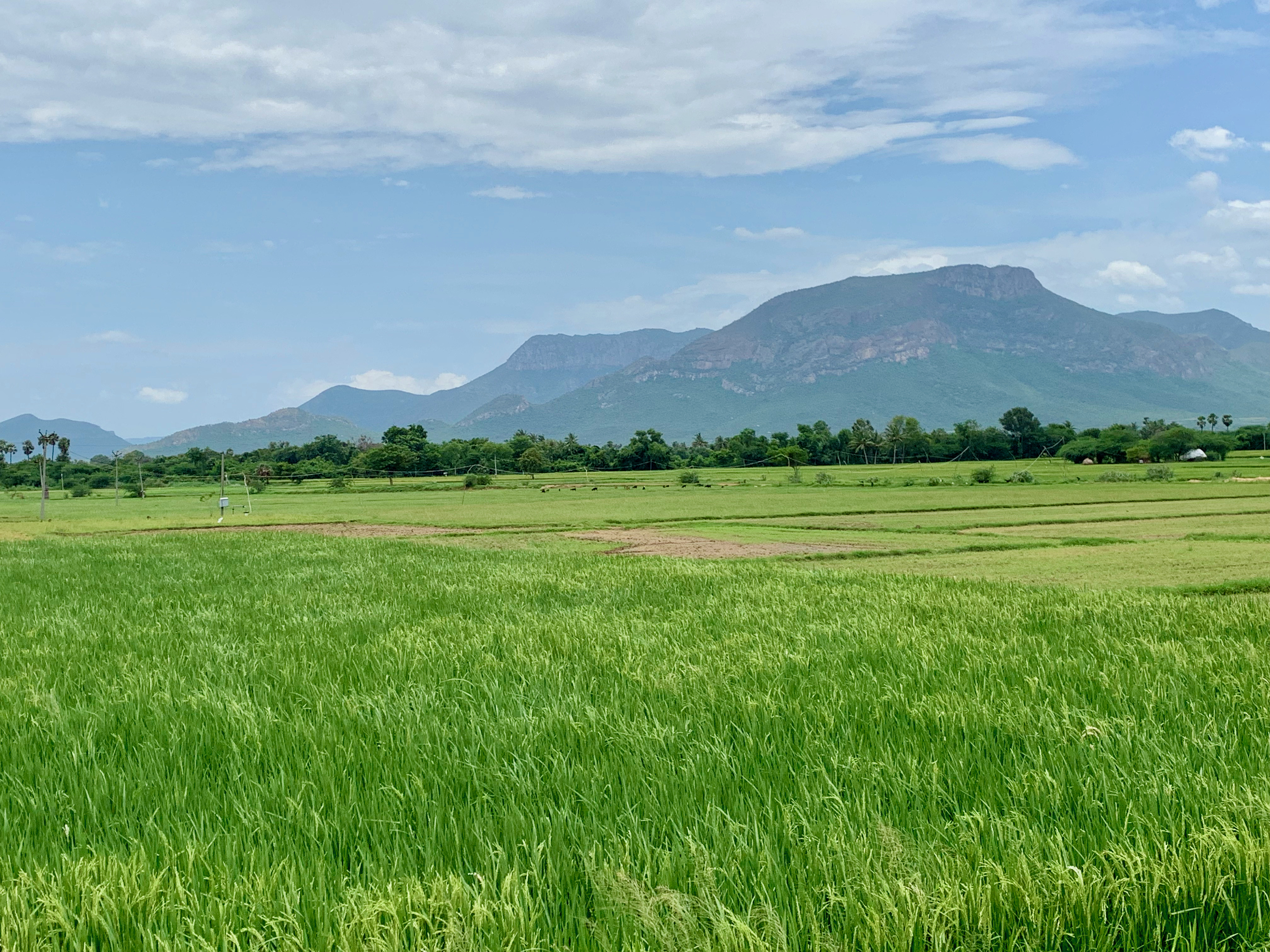
Farms and mountains near Gudimallam village, Andhra Pradesh India

Gudimallam is one of many small villages in a valley of Eastern Ghats of India that passes through Kalahasti and Kuppam. These Ghats along with small rivers originating in these rocky hills and mountains stretch along the eastern coast of India. The village Gudimallam is surrounded by agricultural fields irrigated by the waters of river Swarnamukhi located about 1 kilometre (0.62 mi) northwest of the village and one that originates in Chandragiri hills. The valley is punctuated by forested Tirumala and Horsely hills rich in trapezoid rock called Tirupati Khandolite, a rock that was historically the building material for several temples in Gudimallam and many more in the Kalahasti and Chittoor region.

Gudimallam and nearby valley and hills of the Kalahasti region have had a long history of human habitation. These have included the souras, koyas, sugalis, chenchus, kuruas and others. Archaeological and epigraphical studies suggest that Gudimallam Lingam, one of the oldest Shiva Linga in the world is in the Parasuramesvara temple, one of the temples in Gudimallam. The Lingam has been variously dated between 3rd-century BCE and 2nd-century CE. Further, around this same lingam, the site had a brick apsidal temple by about the 2nd or 3rd-century CE, which was in later centuries rebuilt and expanded many times as evidenced by several inscriptions on its walls.

According to 2011 Census of India, the village included 431 hectares (1,070 acres) and had a population of 2,017 people living in 552 houses. The village is covered by the PIN of 517620, and has a gram panchayat named Gundala Kandriga KCK. The nearest city is Tirupati, about 12 kilometres (7.5 mi) from Gudimallam.
