= Eneabba Stone Arrangement =

Entry on Western Australian Register of Aboriginal Sites

- Location within Western Australia
- 29°56′43″S 115°5′46″E

Eneabba Stone Arrangement is the name given to a registration on the Western Australia's Register of Aboriginal Sites. The arrangement is listed as being at 29°56′43″S 115°5′46″E, about twelve kilometres (7.5 miles) east of the coastal town of Leeman, Western Australia. While the Western Australian Register of Aboriginal Sites lists it as Site Number S01963, the co-ordinates as listed were also stated as unreliable.

In an effort to locate what is known as the Ring of Stones, expeditions were mounted by Rupert Gerritsen and others over a period of six years. The Eneabba Stone Arrangement came under investigation as a possible option for the Ring of Stones, but it was not found at the registered location. In fact, it was not locatable within the proximity of a 20-kilometre (12 mi) radius to its reported location. The Registrar of Aboriginal Sites was informed of this by letter on 31 October 2009, and the results of these expeditions were published in 2010. It is now accepted that the Eneabba Stone Arrangement is not the Ring of Stones, and furthermore it has not been established with any certainty that such a site actually exists except as a name on the register.
