= Ring of Stones =

Supposed stone arrangement in Western Australia

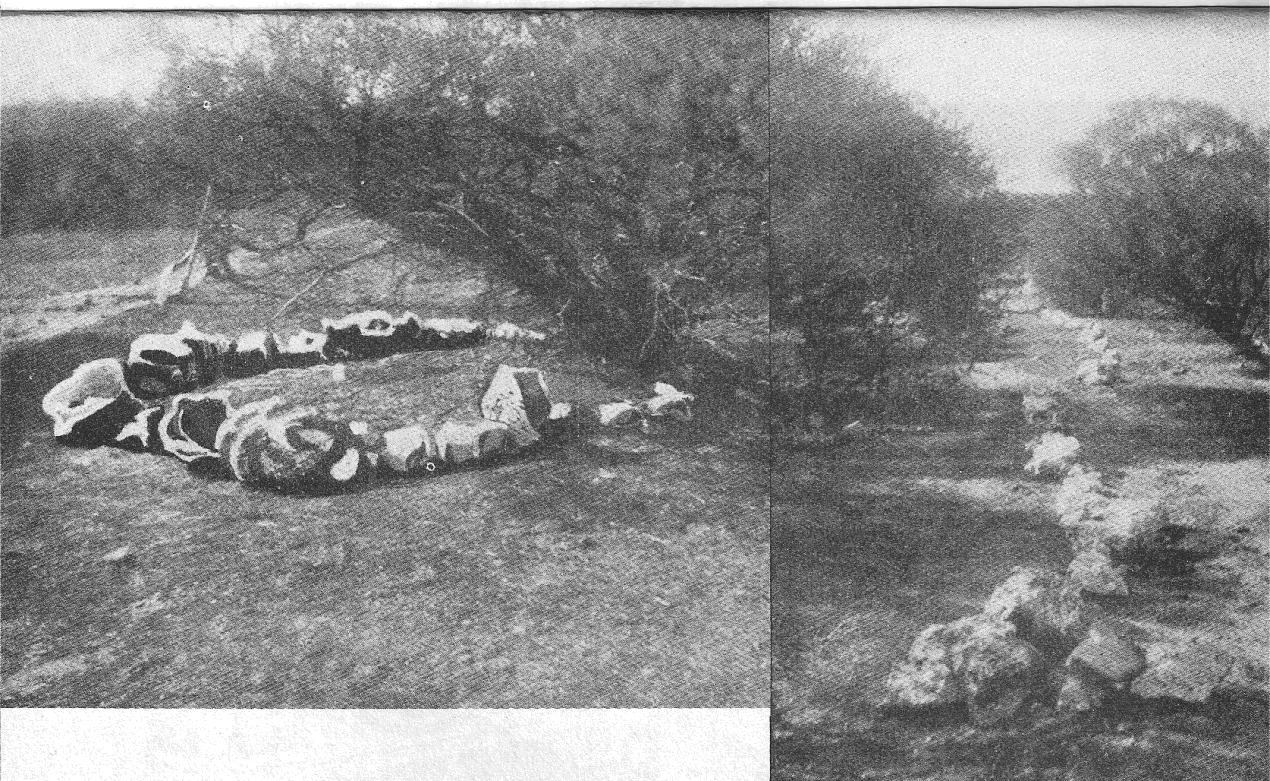
The Ring of Stones, Uren 1940:opp. p.30

The Ring of Stones, also known as the Circle of Stones, is a stone arrangement which may have been constructed by some of the 68 marooned passengers and crew from the Vergulde Draak, a ship of the Dutch East India Company that was wrecked in 1656 about 100 kilometres (62 mi) north of today's Perth, Western Australia. The Ring of Stones was reportedly first seen in 1875 by Admiralty surveyor Alfred Burt and his companion Harry Ogbourne on the coast of Western Australia. No official report was made of the discovery at the time, and it was not until 1930 that the sighting was reported to the Commissioner of the Western Australia Police by Burt. Burt identified the Ring of Stones as being on the central west coast of Western Australia, between Woodada Well and the coast, about "one school day" from the coast.

== Burt’s discovery ==
Alfred Earl Burt was the son of Archibald Burt, first Chief Justice of Western Australia. Alfred Burt ultimately rose to become Registrar of Titles and Deeds in Western Australia.

On 3 November 1930, Burt wrote to the Commissioner of the Western Australia Police to report his discovery of the Ring of Stones in 1875:

I was attached to the Admiralty Marine Survey as Draftsman under Capt. Archdeacon RN in 1875 and was camped at a Well on the old coast road from Geraldton to Perth called 'Woodada'.

One day I had occasion to visit the coast about nine miles distant in order to take provisions to Capt. Archdeacon who was camped there, and also to receive instructions. I started with Mr Harry Ogbourne and a pack horse. When nearing the ocean we struck a dense thicket and when cutting our way through we found a cleared part of about 14 feet square with thicket all around, and in the centre was a complete circle of stones.

— Alfred Burt

Burt indicated on the mud-map accompanying his letter that the Ring of Stones was 1.2 metres (4 ft) in diameter, in a circular clearing 4.3 metres (14 ft) in diameter. He had wanted to return to the site to investigate further, but Captain Archdeacon refused permission. Prior to his death, Ogbourne confirmed that there were no other stones nearby, and so it would appear that the Ring of Stones was not a natural formation but one that was man-made.

Burt had informed the Commissioner of Police of his discovery of the Ring of Stones because he had just been made aware of a document in J. E. Heeres 1899 publication, The Part Borne by the Dutch in the Discovery of Australia, 1606 – 1765, reporting the loss of the Dutch ship Vergulde Draak on the coast of Western Australia on 28 April 1656. His attention had been drawn to this record by journalist Dircksey Cowan, daughter of Edith Cowan. She had been interviewing Burt in regard to the Deadwater Wreck, north of Busselton, which he had also seen in 1876 in company with Captain Archdeacon, while still engaged in the Admiralty survey. The Vergulde Draak had been carrying 78,600 guilders, which went down with the ship, not being recovered until after the wreck was located in 1963. Burt, however, believed the Circle of Stones may have marked the location of a treasure trove, the specie from the Vergulde Draak, and it would seem that this was his reason for informing the Commissioner of Police.

The Commissioner of Police took no immediate action. However, the discovery by two boys, Fred and Alister Edwards, of 40 coins dating from 1618 to 1655, including Spanish reales, in sandhills north of Seabird early in 1931, triggered a frenzy of speculation, mostly relating to the wreck of the Vergulde Draak, and its treasure. Consequently, in May 1931 the police instigated a search for the Ring of Stones. The expedition was led by Constable Sam Loxton from Dongara and included Burt, local landowner Mr A. R. Downes, and another local, a Mr Parker. Between 8 and 11 May the members of the expedition endeavoured to re-locate the Ring of Stones in the area identified by Burt. However, this part of the coast is dominated by dense scrub, mostly wattle, rocky limestone-strewn ground and steep sand ridges. Burt commented that in places the scrub was so impenetrable that "even a bullock could not penetrate it". The expedition failed. Questions were raised about the accuracy of Burt’s recall. But in the end it was decided to make another attempt after firing the area, to make movement and searching easier. And so in late February 1932 another search was undertaken.

The 1932 expedition was again led by Constable Loxton and included Downes, but not Burt. It had been arranged for local Aboriginal people, the Yuat, to fire the country prior to the commencement of the expedition. Some of the Yuat were also recruited to guide the expedition and to burn off parts of the country missed by the earlier fires. For almost a week the party trekked up and down the coast and through the bush, again with no result. Loxton noted that the "Sand Drift Hills" as he called the dunes "increase in size so quickly I would think it quite possible that the spot may have been covered up years ago."

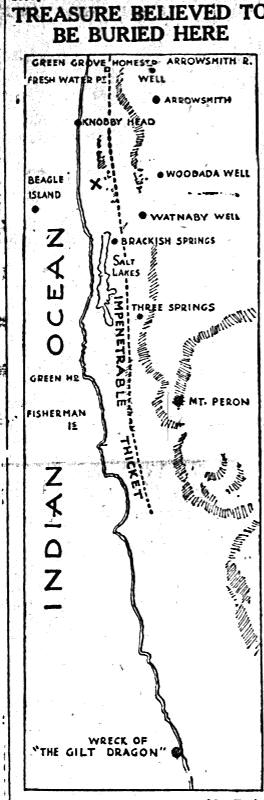
"Treasure Believed To Be Buried Here", The Mirror, 21 January 1933, p.8

== Treasure hunt ==
No further action appears to have been taken by the police following the second expedition, but in July 1932 a farmer from Three Springs, Fred King, wrote to Constable Loxton informing him of a line of stones which were "placed in a straight line running east and West for about one mile at spaces about 150 yards [140 m] apart pointing to a large Sandhill on the Coast and about Woodada Well on the East end about 3 miles [4.8 km] from the sea." King noted that, "at present these stones are hidden by thick scrub." Although King’s letter was mentioned in a report regarding the searches for the Vergulde Draak's treasure in The Mirror the following year, nothing eventuated and it was simply placed on file.

In March 1933 Constable Loxton filed another report indicating a Mr Stokes, at that time ill in hospital, claimed he had been with Burt and Ogbourne when they found the Ring of Stones in 1875. There matters rested until a well-known author and bushman J. E. Hammond, a friend of Alfred Burt’s, decided that he would endeavour to find the Ring of Stones. It appears that some time in 1937 Hammond spent a fortnight searching, burning "several hundred acres of scrub" in the process, without success, before concluding that the Ring had been covered by drifting sand.

Speculation about the treasure from the Vergulde Draak then re-intensified in March 1938 when it was reported that more old coins had been found by children from the Baramba Assisted School, in the same locality as the Edwards find. However, this appears to have been a rehash of the Edwards find in 1931. Then, in December 1938, Jack Hayes and Gabriel Penney located a Ring of Stones, which they took to be Burt’s Ring of Stones. Their find was reported in The West Australian on 10 February 1939.

It appears Penney, a brumby hunter, had come across a stone arrangement around 1931 but had not investigated further at the time. But then in December 1938 he told Hayes, licensee of the Dongara Hotel, about it and the two men set out to relocate the site. They drove in a utility to within "about nine miles [14 km]" of the ring and then made their way on foot. They were "considerably hampered by the thorny bush", but Penney led Hayes to the exact spot. As Hayes described it:

There were three groups of stones in a cleared area ... One was in the form of a ring and the other two were rectangular in shape, situated on each side of the circle. One of the rectangular areas had a base line of about 22 yards [20 m] in length with sides about three feet [91 cm] long.

Photos were taken, unfortunately of poor quality, which show the ring and part of one of the projecting lines of stones.

According to Hayes, the "whole formation was arranged in such a manner as to act as a pointer." The ring was located "at least two miles from the coast," but no more specific locational information was provided. They duly dug for the treasure, but all they encountered was limestone bedrock "under not more than two inches of sand, with occasional potholes about six to nine inches deep." And so there the treasure hunt ceased. A search in 1991 of the Uren Papers held by the State Library of Western Australia failed to locate the original letter from Hayes to Uren.

== Expeditions by Gerritsen and others ==
In his 1994 book, And Their Ghosts May Be Heard, Rupert Gerritsen speculates that perhaps the Ring of Stones had been constructed by the lost sailors from the Vergulde Draak, to indicate to any would-be searchers that they were heading inland, in a north east direction, as indicated by the longer arm of the projecting line of stones. Other possible explanations for the Ring of Stones, such as it being an Aboriginal stone arrangement or a stock route marker, were considered but neither appeared to be viable alternatives. The oldest stock route ran through better watered country about 15 kilometres (9.3 mi) inland, and Aboriginal stone arrangements in southern Western Australia are rare. None appear to be of the form described by Hayes, and they are not usually sited in such inhospitable and out-of-the-way places. A recent claim linking the Ring of Stones with a supposed Aboriginal heritage site, the Eneabba Stone Arrangement, is not supportable.

To ascertain the exact nature of the Ring of Stones, Gerritsen, in collaboration with Bob Sheppard, researcher and principal of Warrigal Press, undertook extensive research and field investigations. Relying primarily on reports published in newspaper and information in Malcolm Uren's book, Sailormen’s Ghosts, Gerritsen, Sheppard and others undertook an initial expedition to relocate the Ring of Stone in April 2004. The area targeted was based on a map published in The Mirror in 1933, the path Burt took in 1875 and the limited positional information provided by Hayes and Penney.

Because the search area was relatively inaccessible, being coastal scrub and heath covering steep relic dunes, two 4-wheel drive vehicles were used. However, owing to the scrubby nature of the terrain, much of which had been burnt in a bushfire in the preceding year or two, staking of the vehicles' tyres considerably hampered progress. Before the day was out the expedition was forced to retire to the small coastal town of Leeman with every tyre, including spares, staked and in a varying degree of deflation.

Based on this experience Gerritsen concluded that the only viable way to search was on foot. He was about to embark on another expedition in October 2008 when Sheppard was able to source Burt’s original letter, mud-map and relevant reports from police files archived in the State Records Office of Western Australia. It was evident from these documents that the form, location and size of Burt’s Ring of Stones was distinctly different from the Ring of Stones found by Hayes and Penney. It was realised that two different 'Ring of Stones' had, in fact, been reported.

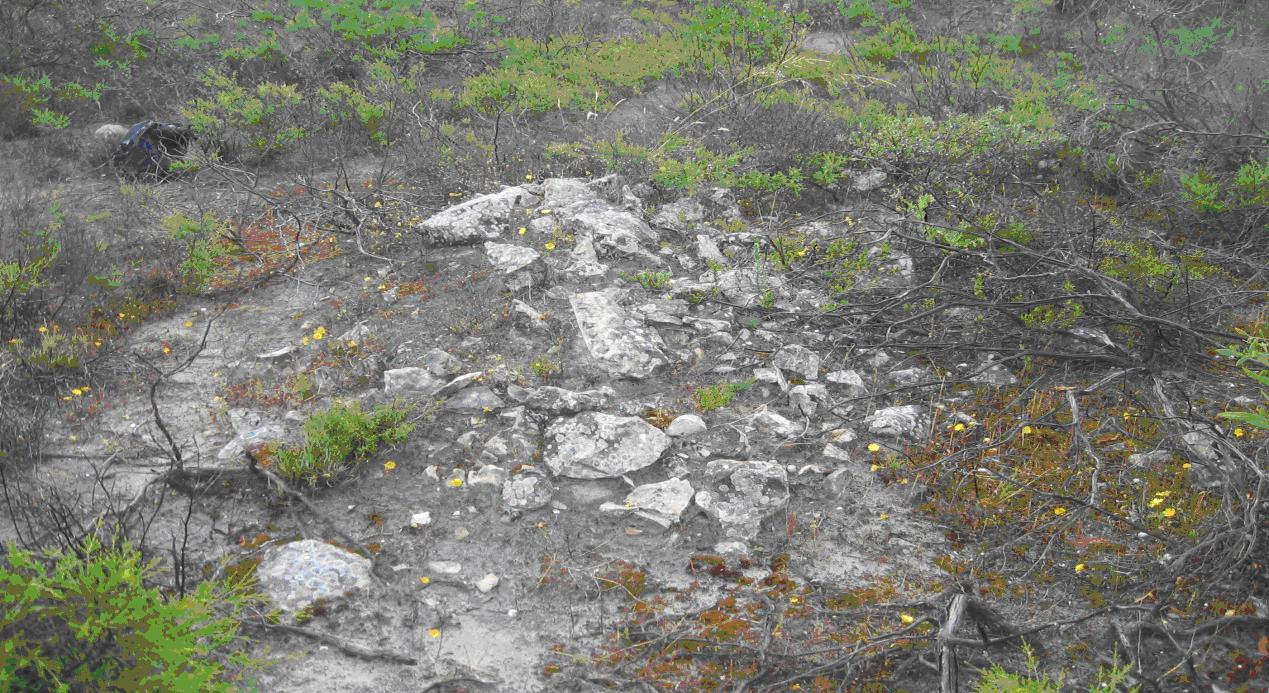
Gerritsen’s finding, 28 October 2008

Armed with the documents from police archives, including Burt’s mud-map, Gerritsen then based his search on the distance from the coast given by Burt, and the Ring of Stones' relative position as indicated on the mud-map. As a result he was able to locate what appeared to be the site of Burt’s Ring of Stone within a day, on 28 October 2008. This location appeared to be confirmed the next day by following the latter part of the route Burt had taken from Woodada Well, as indicated on his mud-map. However, while the location matched Burt’s designation and description, in the centre of the clearing was a pile of stones, 2.1 m (6 ft 11 in) long, 1.0 m (3 ft 3 in) wide and 20 cm (7.9 in) high, resembling a grave. Gerritsen took photographs and GPS readings and conducted a metal detection search. Upon his return to Perth he informed Sheppard, who visited the site a few days later and confirmed that the location seemed to be correct and that the pile of stones did appear to resemble a grave.

== Major Crime Squad investigation ==
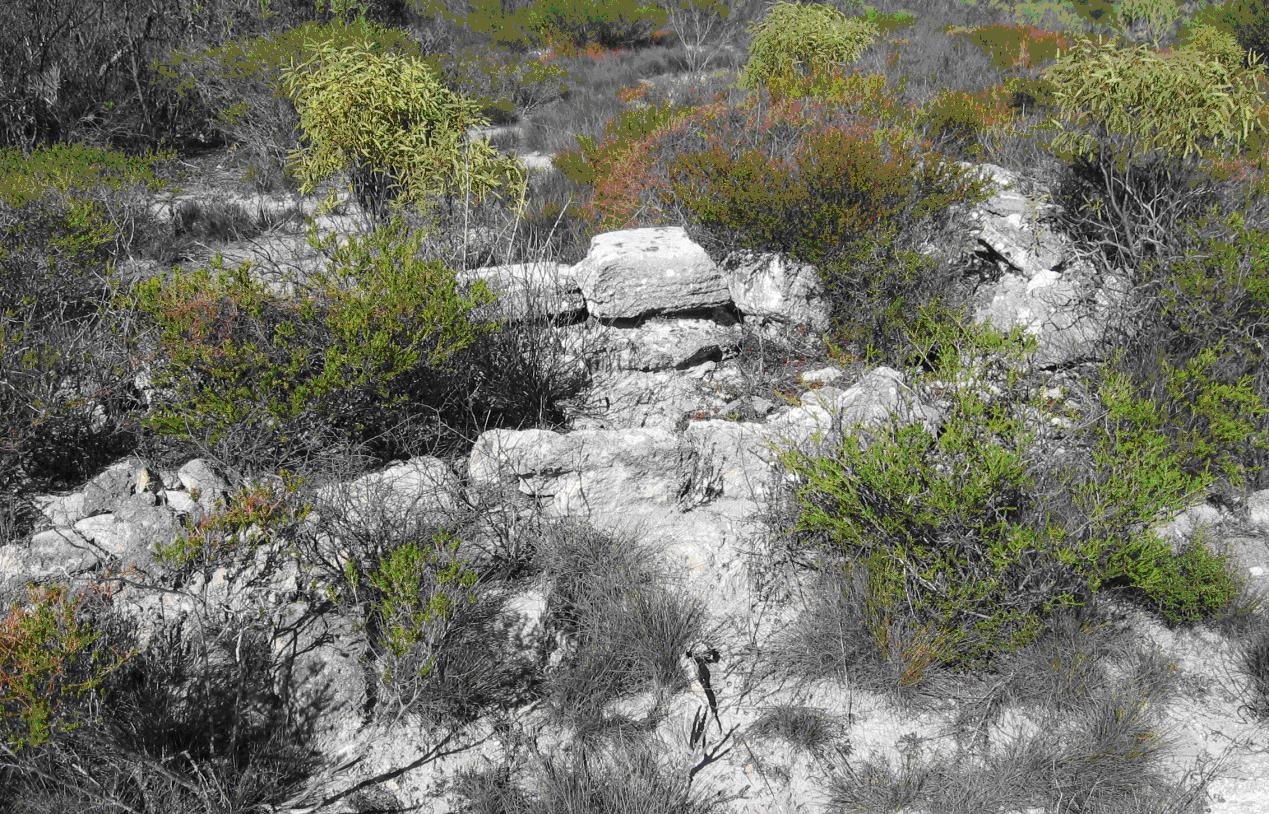
Gerritsen's discovery in June 2009.

The Maritime Archaeology Department of the Western Australian Museum was then informed. Because of the suspicion that this may have been a grave, Gerritsen was advised to inform the Western Australia Police. This was duly done, and all relevant information and photographic evidence was also supplied. This material was then passed on to the Major Crime Squad.

The Major Crime Squad initiated an investigation and reported in February 2009 that this was not a grave but simply a pile of stones. Gerritsen speculated that the pile of stones was the remnant of Burt’s Ring of Stones, the stone having been piled in the middle of the clearing by treasure hunters at some point in the past as they searched for the treasure they believed was there. The subsequent discovery of two other stony areas by Sheppard and Gerritsen only 200–300 m (660–980 ft) away, where stones also seem to have been piled up, provides some support for this contention.

== Further expeditions ==
Following this, attention turned to locating Hayes and Penney’s Ring of Stones. Whereas Burt’s Ring of Stones had been 800 metres (0.5 mi) from the coast, was 120 centimetres (4 ft) in diameter and a simple circle; the Hayes-Penney Ring of Stones was "about" or "at least two miles [3.2 km] from the coast", was "eight feet [2.4 m]" across, and had a line of stones leading off it, so that is looked "like a pointer". Apart from the distance from the coast there was, however, little specific locational information provided in Hayes and Penney’s account. It would appear that they drove south from Dongara to the end of a dirt track to within "about nine miles [14 km]" of their Ring of Stones, and then proceeded on foot for "seven or eight miles [11 or 13 km]".

Based on the limited, imprecise and inconsistent information provided by Hayes, and utilising maps contemporaneous with the time of Hayes and Penney’s discovery of their Ring of Stones, an attempt was made to reconstruct their journey. This placed the Hayes-Penney’s Ring of Stones approximately 25 kilometres (16 mi) south southeast of Dongara and about 30 kilometres (19 mi) north of Burt’s Ring of Stones.

In order to eliminate other possibilities Gerritsen also began to investigate Aboriginal stone arrangements on this part of the coast, as listed on the Western Australian Department of Indigenous Affairs Aboriginal Heritage Inquiry System, specifically the sites designated as Eneabba Stone Arrangement (Site No. 4760) and Eneabba West (Site No. 15297). The Eneabba Stone Arrangement, however, could not be found in the designated location, despite a thorough search. When examined by Gerritsen it was quite apparent the Eneabba West site did not resemble the Ring of Stones in the slightest. However, the remains of what appeared to be a man-made stone wall, overlooking a shallow valley, was located in proximity to the Eneabba West site by Gerritsen on 17 June 2009.

The structure is situated in a relatively inaccessible and inhospitable location and has the appearance of being a lookout or a defensive structure. Despite close examination, test pitting and metal detection of the surrounds on two occasions in 2009, no sign of any human occupation or presence could be found. Possible explanations for this structure that are under consideration are: that is an Aboriginal stone arrangement, or that it was constructed by survivors from the Vergulde Draeck, runaway convicts, drovers or recreational campers, or by those engaged in military exercises in the area.

The search for the Hayes-Penney Ring of Stone commenced in June 2009. A 640-hectare (1,600-acre) search area was delineated, the parameters of which were based on a reconstruction of the journey Hayes and Penney undertook, the locational details contained their account, and the uncertainties inherent in this. The search was also guided by the published photographs, which provide visual clues as to the nature of the country where they encountered the Ring of Stones.

By July 2010 the search of the designated search area had been completed, without result. An approach was then made by Gerritsen in July 2010 to the archives section of West Australian Newspapers to ascertain if they had retained the letter Hayes wrote to Uren in February 1939, as well as the "rough sketch of the locality" and at least one additional photo, which Uren had indicated had accompanied the original letter. This was not successful.

The search for the Hayes-Penney Ring of Stones is therefore still continuing. Since the beginning of July 2010 other search strategies have been employed based on alternative hypotheses on the location of the Ring of Stones and reconstructions of the journey by Hayes and Penney.

== Sources ==
- Burt, Alfred (3 November 1930). "Letter and Accompanying Mud-map". Letter to Commissioner of Police for Western Australia. Western Australia State Records Office: Police.
- Flowers, Greg (2001). Gilt Dragon Terrestrial Investigation: Skeleton and Coin Sites, April 2001 (PDF). Innaloo: Maritime Archaeology Association of Western Australia.
