= Triprangode Siva Temple =

Hindu temple in Kerala, India

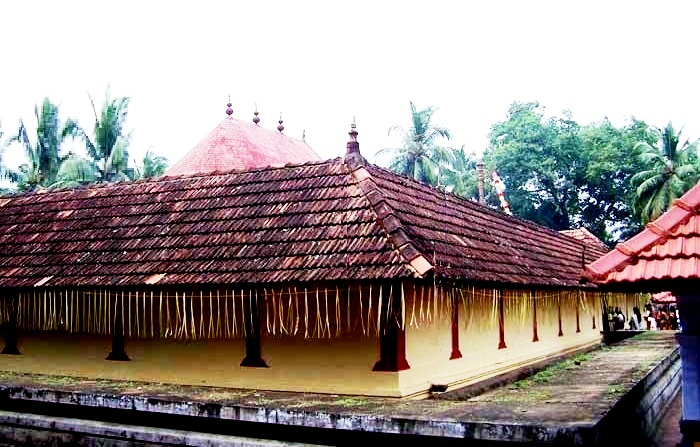

- Siva Temple, Triprangode, Malappuram, Kerala

Religion
- Affiliation: Hinduism
- District: Malappuram
- Deity: Shiva
- Festival: Maha Shivaratri

Location
- Location: Triprangode
- State: Kerala
- Country: India
- Coordinates: 10.855549°N 75.947727°E

Architecture
- Type: Architecture of Kerala

Specifications
- Temple: One
- Elevation: 29.16 m (96 ft)

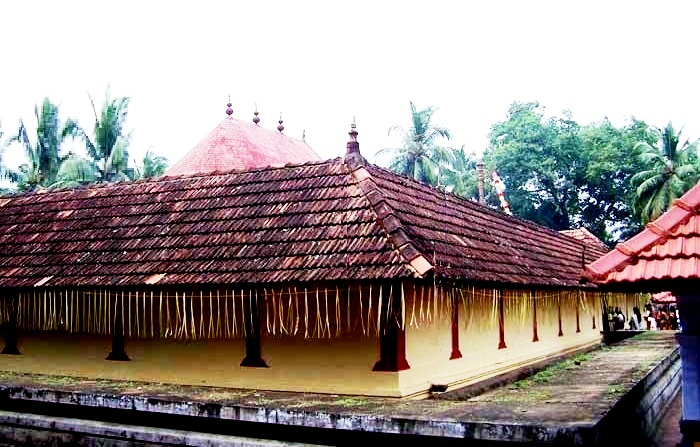
Thripangodu Shiva temple

Triprangode Siva Temple is a Hindu temple at Triprangode, Malappuram district, Kerala. Thriprangode Shiva Temple is one of the most renowned Shiva temples in Kerala. Steeped in Puranic lore, it is located in the village of Thriprangode, within the Tirur Taluk of Malappuram district. It is counted among the 108 Shiva temples believed to have been consecrated by Parashurama. The presiding deity is enshrined facing west, in the form of 'Kalasamharamurthi' (the Lord who conquered Time). In addition to this, there are four other Shiva idols within the temple complex. Other deities worshipped here include Parvati, Ganapathi, Dakshinamurthi, Mahavishnu (in the form of 'Navamukunda'), Sree Krishna (in the form of 'Goshala Krishna'), Ayyappa, Vettakkorumakan, Bhadrakali, and Brahmarakshassu. The major annual observances at this temple are an eight-day festival—concluding with the 'Arattu' ritual on the day of the star Thiruvathira in the Malayalam month of Dhanu—and the celebration of Maha Shivaratri in the month of Kumbham. This significant temple is administered by the Malabar Devaswom Board.
