= Ringstone =

Type of artefact and miniature sculpture made in India

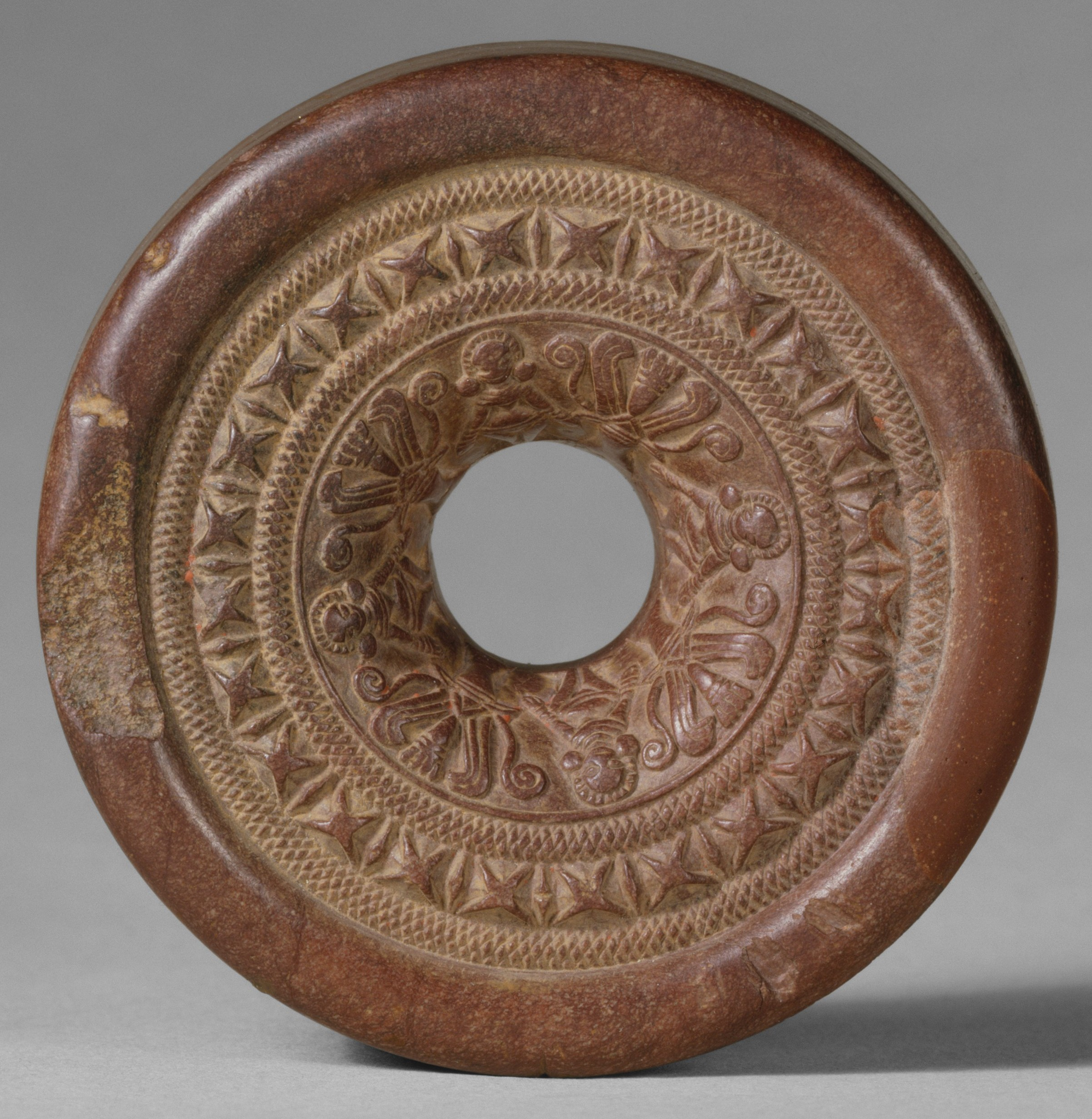
"Ringstone with Four Goddesses and Four Date Palms" that has a four-pointed star motif in a border, Metropolitan Museum of Art (New York)

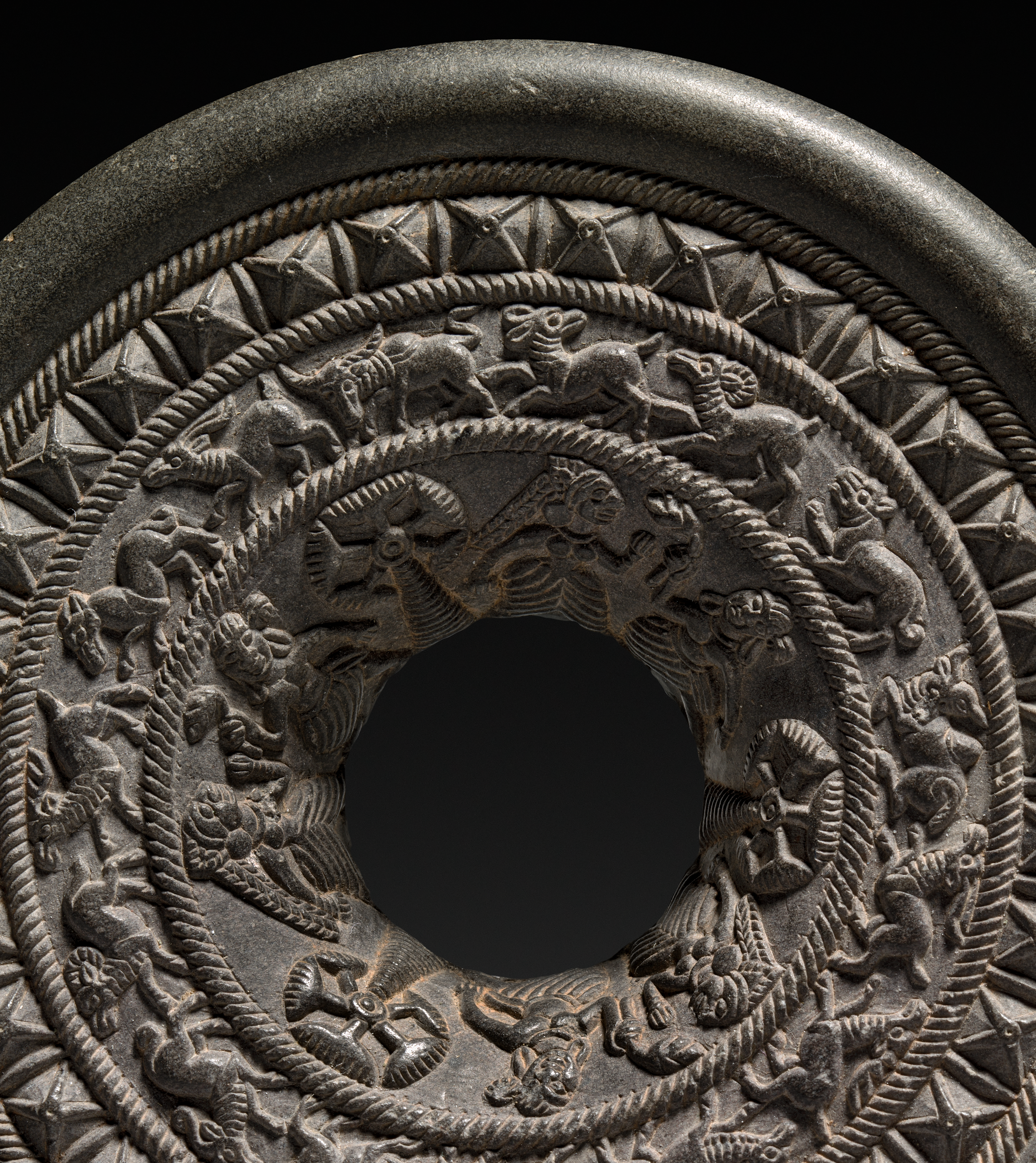
Detail of a complete ringstone having a central border with figures of women in full-length skirts separated by trees, a border motif of fifteen different animals, and a border motif of four-pointed stars, Cleveland Museum of Art

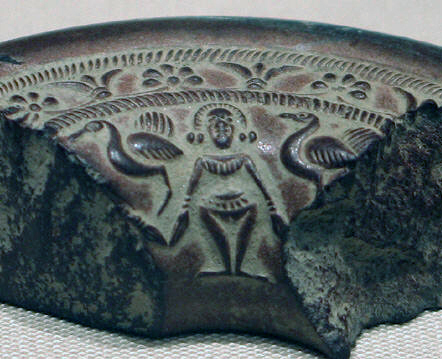
Broken section of a ringstone with a woman in the characteristic posture, flanked by birds, probably geese, Metropolitan Museum of Art (New York)

The ringstone is a distinctive type of artefact and miniature sculpture made in India during the approximate period of the Mauryan Empire (c. 322–185 BCE) and the following Sunga Empire (187–78 BCE). They are usually dated to the third or second centuries BCE. They are shaped somewhat like a doughnut, but with straighter outer edges and they are flat and plain on the obverse. They are carved out of stone, with very fine relief on the top side that includes several zones of decoration surrounding a circular opening in the centre. Many feature a four-pointed star as a repeated border motif. They measure approximately 2.5 to 4 inches (64 to 102 mm) across the diameter.

Their purpose, and any practical function, remains unclear and "enigmatic". They may have had a specific religious purpose or a more general one such as promoting fertility. They may have been used to make components of jewelry by pressing metal foil over the designs. Approximately 70 have been found, many only as fragments, with a 2014 find in Thailand being the first from outside the Indian subcontinent; it is presumed this was imported from India.

Ringstones were first described by Alexander Cunningham, who published an image of one in the late nineteenth century. By the time of the S. P. Gupta survey of 1980, at least 32 ringstones and 36 discstones were recorded; the numbers have continued to rise.

== Decoration ==
The designs vary, but all examples are finely carved, despite their small size. A number of components appear in a variety of arrangements. Typically the innermost zone, which runs down the sloping sides of the hole, has four standing female figures, many are nude "with fully exposed genitalia", bent knees pointing outward, and heels together, with jewelry and elaborate hairstyles, and trees separate them. Four-pointed stars are featured in motifs surrounding the rims of many of the stones. The women may be described as "goddesses", or "mother goddesses", and the trees, apparently of various species or apparently of palm species, may be described as the tree of life, but these interpretations are not universally accepted.

The example in the Cleveland Museum of Art, where its three pairs of standing female figures with wide, full-length skirts are standing in the innermost section with their feet pointing toward the hole, it is followed by a cable or rope pattern border, then a border of fifteen animals in profile with their feet also toward the central hole. After another rope border there is one of "cross-and-reel" or a four-pointed star motif, then a final rope border before a plain and smooth outer zone. This ringstone is more elaborate than most examples, which are often similar, but without the animal zone. The example found in Thailand has an animal border but no "cross-and-reel" or star border, whereas those in the Victoria and Albert Museum and British Museum each have two of those, but no animals. In one example the animals in a border are "lizards or crocodiles".

A somewhat similar ivory disc with a central hole only has the standing figures of women in its single zone. It is dated to the second century BCE.

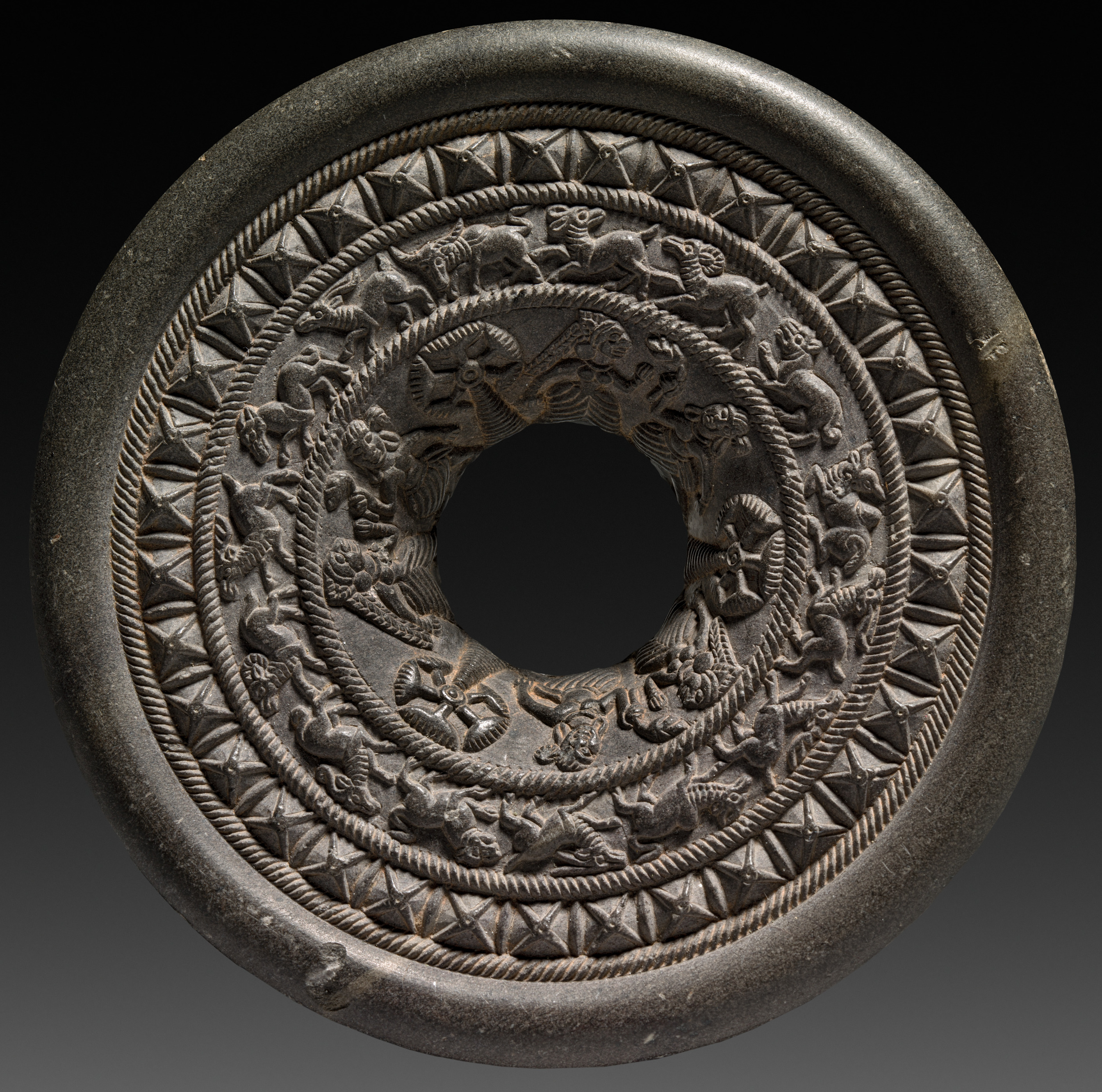
Complete example in the Cleveland Museum of Art (detailed description above)

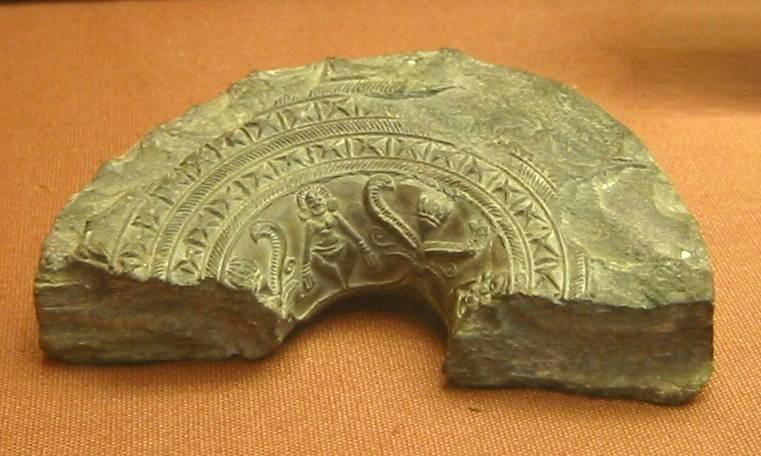
"Goddesses", plants, and four-pointed star motif border British Museum

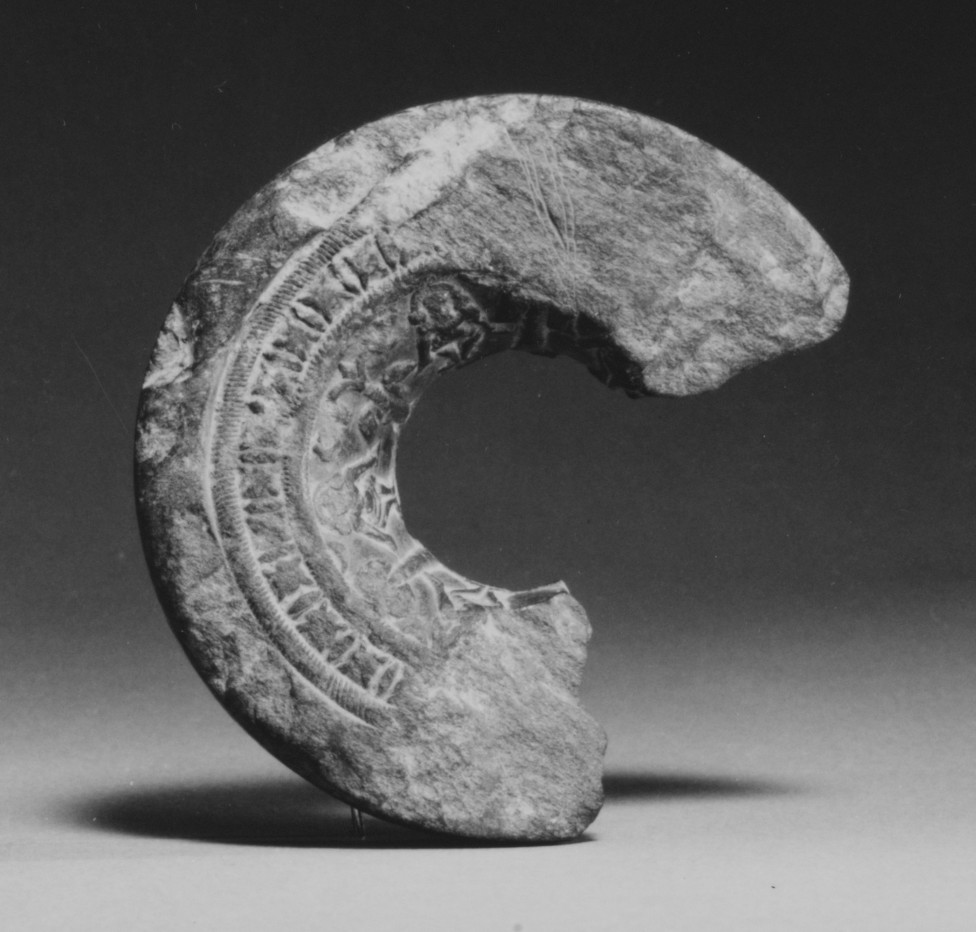
Metropolitan Museum of Art, New York, with "Goddesses and Palm Trees" and four-pointed star motif

== Purpose ==
Various purposes and uses for ringstones have been proposed, but without any theories gaining general acceptance. One suggestion is that they were matrices for moulding as jewelry created by beating thin sheets of metal, probably gold foil that always has been important in Indian culture, but evidence to support that theory has very few surviving examples from ancient times. Although not favored by some scholars, this theory may have gained some ground following the 2014 discovery in Thailand that was found near fragments of thin gold foil, one of which had an animal pattern very similar to that on the ringstone discovered at the same time.

Ananda Coomaraswamy has suggested that the ringstones might have been worn as jewellery, however, consensus exists among the other scholars that the ringstones are too heavy to have been worn. Others speculate that they may have been objects used in meditation, or somehow connected with fertility rituals. One scholar even suggested without explanation that they might have been used as a "physical contraceptive device".

Some examples have brief and informal inscriptions on the blank obverse. As of 2019, they had not been translated or interpreted.

== Geographical distribution ==
Apart from the recent Thai find, the findspots are distributed (such as Mauryan territory) across north India, ranging from Taxila in the Punjab (now Pakistan) in the northwest to Patna, Bihar in the east. Most have been found in urban centres on the Grand Trunk Road. As they are easily portable and have very consistent characteristics, they all may have been made in a single centre, for which Pataliputra (now Patna), the capital of the successive Mauryan and Sunga empires, is one obvious candidate.

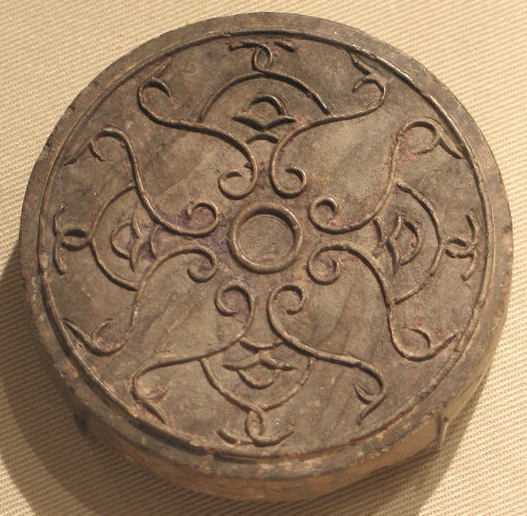
Discstone, first century BCE, Metropolitan Museum of Art

== Discstones ==
The ringstone tradition seems to have developed into the manufacture of the discstone, which is similar in shape, but having a flat top with a plain circular space in the center, rather than a hole that pierces the object. They also are manufactured in stone, but are not quite so precisely carved, with mostly plant-based decoration that is not divided into narrow circular zones in the same way, and they have abstract designs or symbols. The illustrated example (right) has relatively simple decoration, with narrow tendril-like elements. Discstones usually are dated to the first century BCE.

In 2019, a contemporary report was published about a discstone found in Myanmar.

== Collections ==
The largest collection of ringstones is in the Patna Museum. Other large Indian museums also have examples. Several major museums outside India have examples, including the Metropolitan Museum of Art in Manhattan (3), the Cleveland Museum of Art, the British Museum (2), the Berlin State Museums, and the Victoria and Albert Museum in London (holding the only example with a provenance, from Taxila), and Los Angeles County Museum of Art. A number are in private collections and at least three were up for sale on the art market in the 2010s.

== Bibliography ==
- "Ball", "Unidentified Artist, Northeast Indian (Sunga Dynasty)", David Owsley Museum of Art Collection, Ball State University (Ivory ring)
- Bennett, Anna (2017), "Sunga ringstone found in Thailand"; photos of lecture slides
- Bennett, Anna (2019), "Suvarnabhumi, "Land of Gold"", in Suvarnabhumi, the Golden Land, 2019, GISDA, PDF
- Lerner, Martin and Kossak, Steven, The Lotus Transcendent: Indian and Southeast Asian Art from the Samuel Eilenberg Collection, 1991, Metropolitan Museum of Art (New York, N.Y.), ISBN 0870996134, 9780870996139, google books
- Siudmak, John, Catalogue No. 5, "Indian and Himalayan Sculpture", 2016, Catalogue No. 2,
- "V&A": "Ring stone" in collection
