= Lingam =

Aniconic representation of the Hindu god Shiva

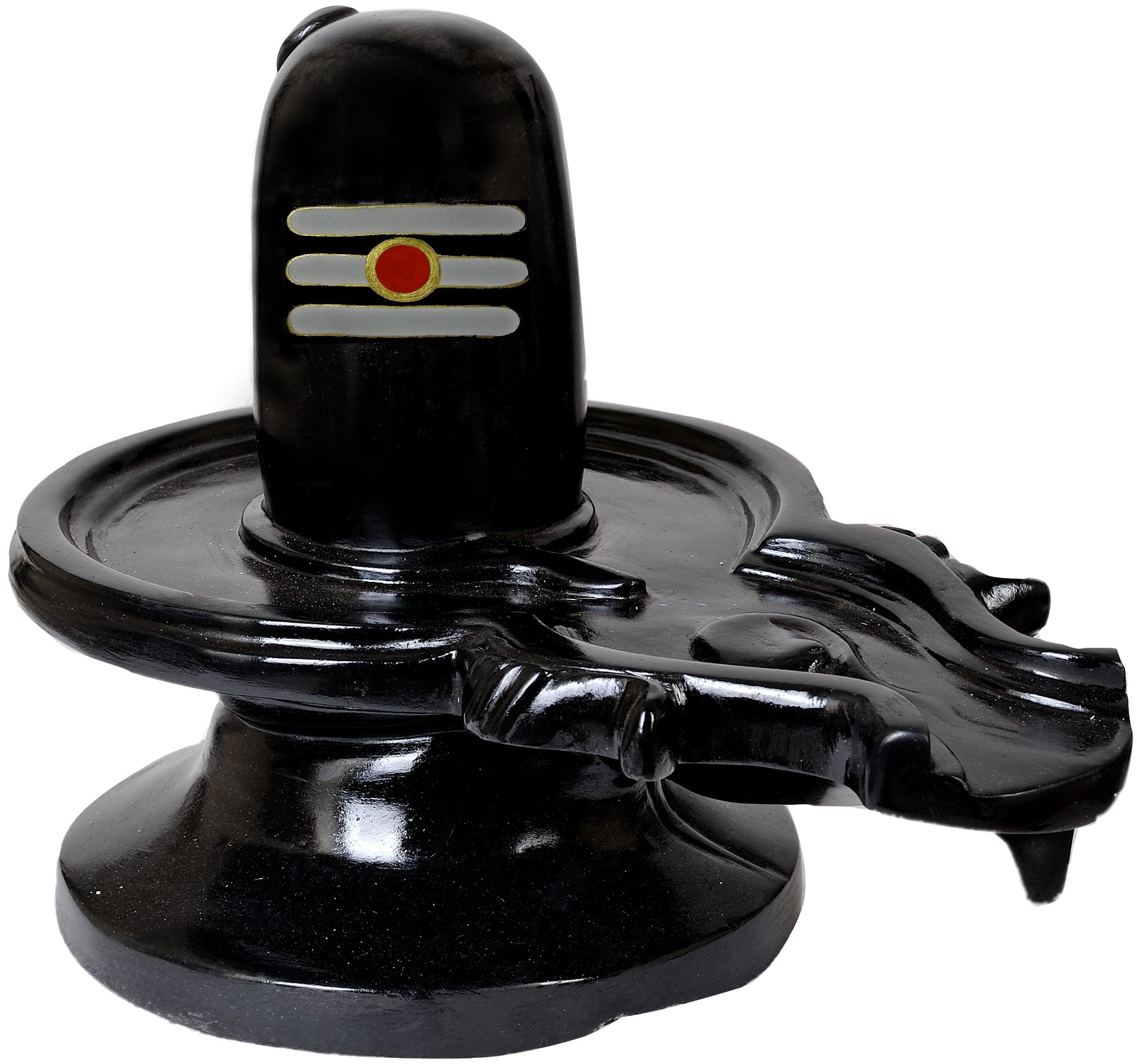
A lingam with tripundra, projected on a yoni base

A lingam (IAST: liṅga, lit. "sign, symbol or mark"), sometimes referred to as linga or Shiva linga, is an abstract or aniconic representation of the Hindu god Shiva in Shaivism. The word lingam is found in the Upanishads and epic literature, where it means a "mark, sign, emblem, characteristic", the "evidence, proof, symptom" of Shiva and Shiva's power.

The lingam of the Shaivism tradition is a short cylindrical pillar-like symbol of Shiva, made of stone, metal, gem, wood, clay or precious stones. It is often represented within a disc-shaped platform, the yoni – its feminine counterpart, consisting of a flat element, horizontal compared to the vertical lingam, and designed to allow liquid offerings to drain away for collection.

The lingam is an emblem of generative and destructive power. While rooted in representations of the male sexual organ, the lingam is regarded as the "outward symbol" of the "formless reality", the symbolization of merging of the "primordial matter" (Prakṛti) with the "pure consciousness" (Purusha) in the transcendental context. The lingam-yoni iconography symbolizes the merging of microcosmos and macrocosmos, the divine eternal process of creation and regeneration, and the union of the feminine and the masculine that recreates all of existence.

The lingam is typically the primary murti or devotional image in Hindu temples dedicated to Shiva, also found in smaller shrines, or as self-manifested natural objects.

== Etymology and nomenclature ==
Lingam, states Monier Monier-Williams, appears in the Upanishads and epic literature, where it means a "mark, sign, emblem, characteristic". Other contextual meanings of the term include "evidence, proof, symptom" of Shiva and Shiva's power.

The word lingam is found in Sanskrit texts, such as Shvetashvatara Upanishad, Samkhya, Vaisheshika and other texts with the meaning of "evidence" of God and God's existence, or existence of formless Brahman. The original meaning of lingam as "sign" is used in Shvetashvatara Upanishad, which says "Shiva, the Supreme Lord, has no linga", meaning he is transcendental, beyond any characteristic and, specifically, the sign of gender.

The term also appears in early Indian texts on logic, where an inference is based on a sign (linga), such as "if there is smoke, there is fire" where the linga is the smoke. It is a religious symbol in Hinduism representing Shiva as the generative power, all of existence, all creativity and fertility at every cosmic level.

In early Sanskrit medical texts, linga means "symptom, signs" and plays a key role in the diagnosis of a sickness, the disease. The author of classical Sanskrit grammar treatise, Panini, states that the verbal root ling which means "paint, variegate", has the sense "that which paints, variegates, characterizes". Panini as well as Patanjali additionally mention lingam with the contextual meaning of the "gender".

In the Vaisheshika Sutras, it means "proof or evidence", as a conditionally sufficient mark or sign. This Vaisheshika theory is adopted in the early Sanskrit medical literature. Like the Upanishads, where linga means "mark, sign, characteristic", the texts of the Nyaya school of Hindu philosophy use linga in the same sense. In the Samkhya sutras, and in Gaudapada's commentary on Samkhyakarika, the term linga has many contextual meanings such as in verses 1.124.136, 3.9.16 and 5.21.61, as it develops its theory of the nature of Atman (Self) and Sarira (body, prakriti) and its proposed mechanism of rebirth. In the Purva Mimamsa Sutra and the Vedanta sutra, as well as the commentaries on them, the term linga appears quite often, particularly in the form of "lingadarsanacca" as a form of citing or referencing prior Hindu literature. This phrase connotes "[we have found an] indicative sign", such as the "indicative sign is in a Vedic passage".

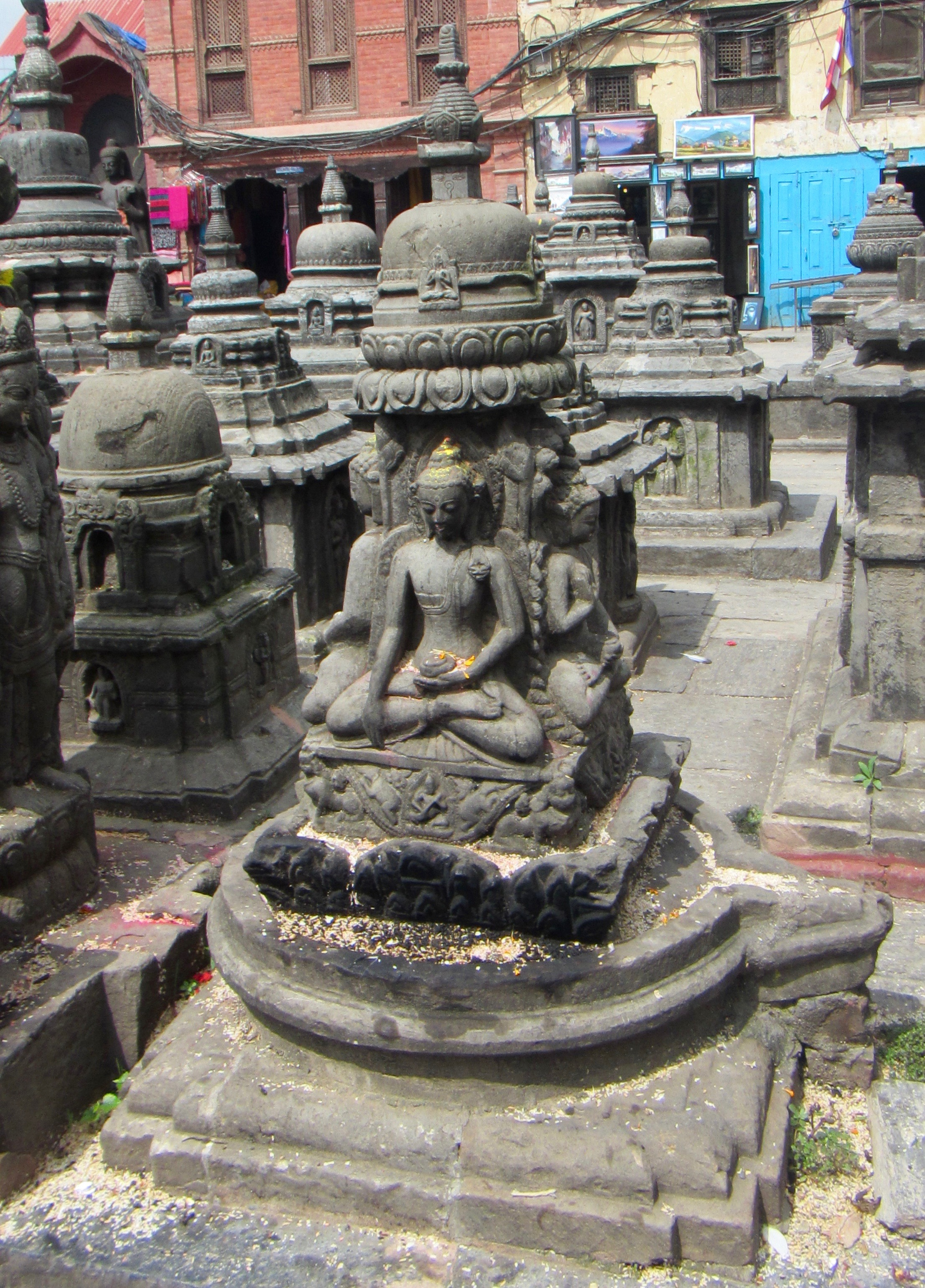
A linga-yoni in Nepal carved with four seated Buddhas

The term linga also appears in Buddhist and Jaina literature, where it means "sign, evidence" in one context, or "subtle body" with sexual connotations in another. (Note: Examples of this usage include the Laṅkāvatāra Sūtra in Buddhism, and Sukhlalji's bhasya on Tattvarthasutra in Jainism.)

== Iconography ==
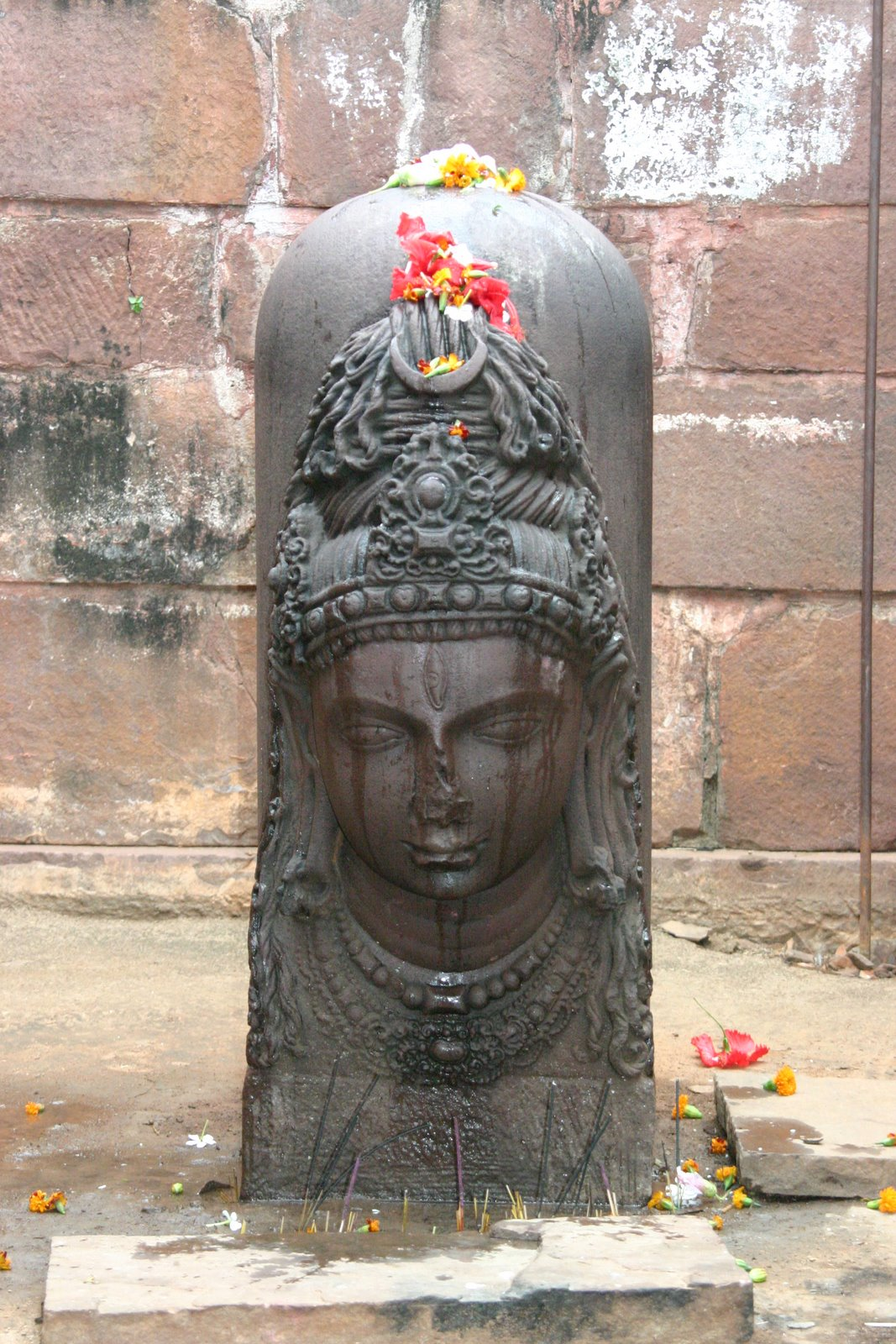
a 5th-century Mukha-linga (with face)

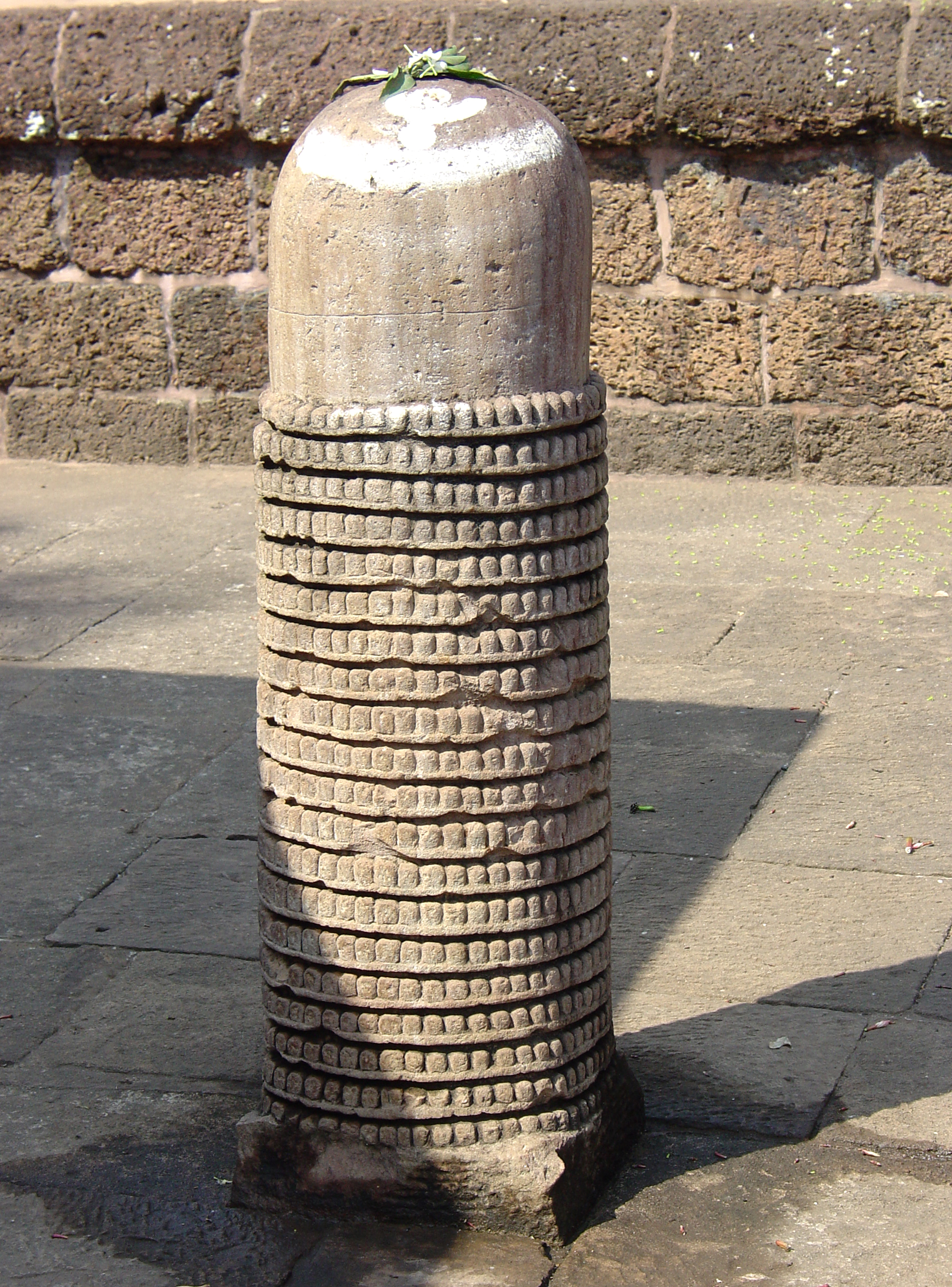
a Sahasra-linga (with 1001 carvings).

Lingam iconography exists in many forms, and their design are described in the Agama texts.

=== Various styles ===
The lingam of the Shaivism tradition is a short cylindrical pillar-like symbol of Shiva, made of stone, metal, gem, wood, clay or precious stones.

Various styles of lingam iconography are found on the Indian subcontinent and southeast Asia. The historic lingam iconography has included:

- Lingam-yoni, wherein the lingam is placed within a lipped, disked structure that is an emblem of goddess Shakti and this is called the yoni. Together they symbolize the union of the feminine and the masculine principles, and "the totality of all existence", states Encyclopædia Britannica.
- Mukhalingam, where the lingam has the face of Shiva carved on it. An Ekmukha lingam has just one face, Chaturmukha lingam has four faces in the cardinal directions, while a Panchamukha lingam has a total of five (the fifth is on the top) and represents Sadashiva. Among the mukha-lingam varieties, the four face version are more common.
- Ashtottara-sata linga, where 108 miniature lingas are carved on the pujabhaga (main linga) following certain geometric principles.
- Sahasra linga, where 1001 miniature lingas are carved on the pujabhaga (main linga) following certain geometric principles (set in 99 vertical lines, 11 horizontal).
- Dhara linga, where lingas have five to sixty four fluted facets, with prime numbers and multiples of four particularly favored.
- Lingodbhava, where Shiva is seen as emerging from within a fiery lingam. On top of this icon is sometimes a relief of a swan representing Brahma as Hamsa, and a wild boar at the bottom representing Vishnu as Varaha. This reflects the Shaiva legend describing a competition between Brahma, Shiva, Vishnu, as to who has priority and superiority in the Shiva Purana.

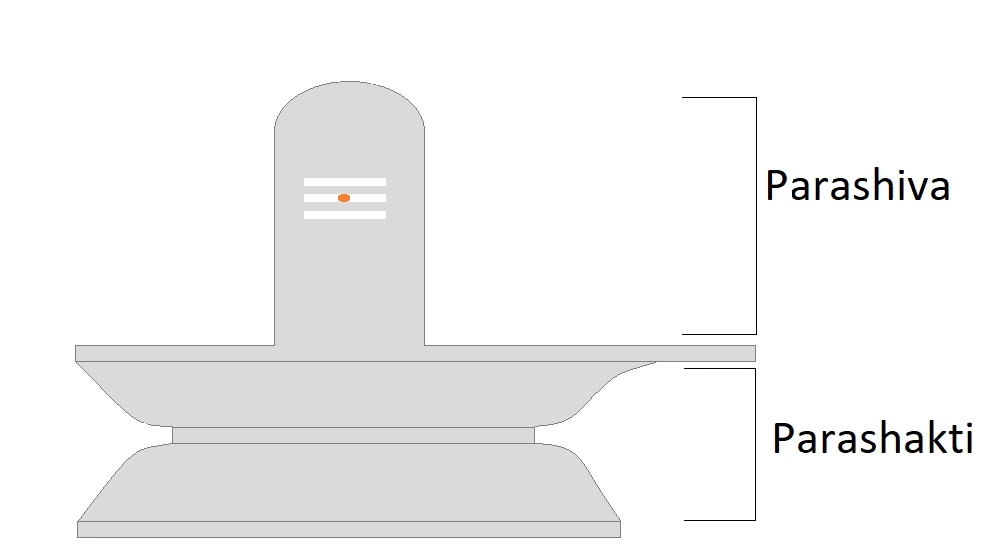
Lingam as interpreted in the Shaiva Siddhanta tradition, a major school of Shaivism. The icon is regarded to represent the Parashiva and Parashakti aspects of Shiva and Parvati.

=== Construction ===
A lingam may be made of clay (mrinmaya), metal (lohaja), precious stone (ratnaja), wood (daruja), stone (shailaja, most common), or a disposable material (kshanika). The construction method, proportions and design is described in Shaiva Agama texts. The lingam is typically set in the center of a pindika (also called yoni or pithas, symbolizing Shakti). A pindika may be circular, square, octagonal, hexagonal, duodecagonal, hexadecagonal, elliptical, triangular or another shape. Some lingams are miniaturized and they are carried on one's person, such as by Lingayats in a necklace. These are called chala-lingams. The Hindu temple design manuals recommend geometric ratios for the linga, the sanctum and the various architectural features of the temple according to certain mathematical rules it considers perfect and sacred. Anthropologist Christopher John Fuller states that although most sculpted images (murtis) are anthropomorphic or theriomorphic, the aniconic Shiva Linga is an important exception.

== Meaning ==
=== Representation of Shiva ===
The lingam is conceptualized both as an emblem of generative and destructive power, particularly in the esoteric Kaula and Tantra practices, as well as the Shaivism and Shaktism traditions of Hinduism.

The lingam and yoni together symbolize the merging of microcosmos and macrocosmos, the divine eternal process of creation and regeneration, and the union of the feminine and the masculine that recreates all of existence. The lingam is regarded as the "outward symbol" of the "formless Reality", the symbolization of merging of the 'primordial matter' (Prakṛti) with the 'pure consciousness' (Purusha) in transcendental context. Sivaya Subramuniyaswami elaborates that the lingam signifies three perfections of Shiva. The upper oval part of the lingam represents Parashiva and the lower part of the lingam, called the pitha, represents Parashakti. In the representation of Parashiva, Shiva is regarded to be the absolute reality, the timeless, formless, and spaceless. In the representation of Parashakti, Shiva is regarded to be all-pervasive, pure consciousness, the power and primal substance of all that exists. Parashakti is regarded to possess form, unlike Parashiva, which is formless.

According to Sivananda Saraswati, the lingam speaks unmistakable language of silence: "I am one without a second, I am formless". It is only the outward symbol of formless being, Shiva, who is eternal, ever-pure, immortal essence of this vast universe, who is your innermost Self or Atman, and who is identical with the Supreme Brahman, states Sivananda Saraswati.

To some Shaivites the lingam symbolizes the axis of the universe.

According to Shaiva Siddhanta, the linga is the ideal substrate in which the worshipper should install and worship the five-faced and ten-armed Sadāśiva, the form of Shiva who is the focal divinity of that school of Shaivism.

=== Phallus symbol ===
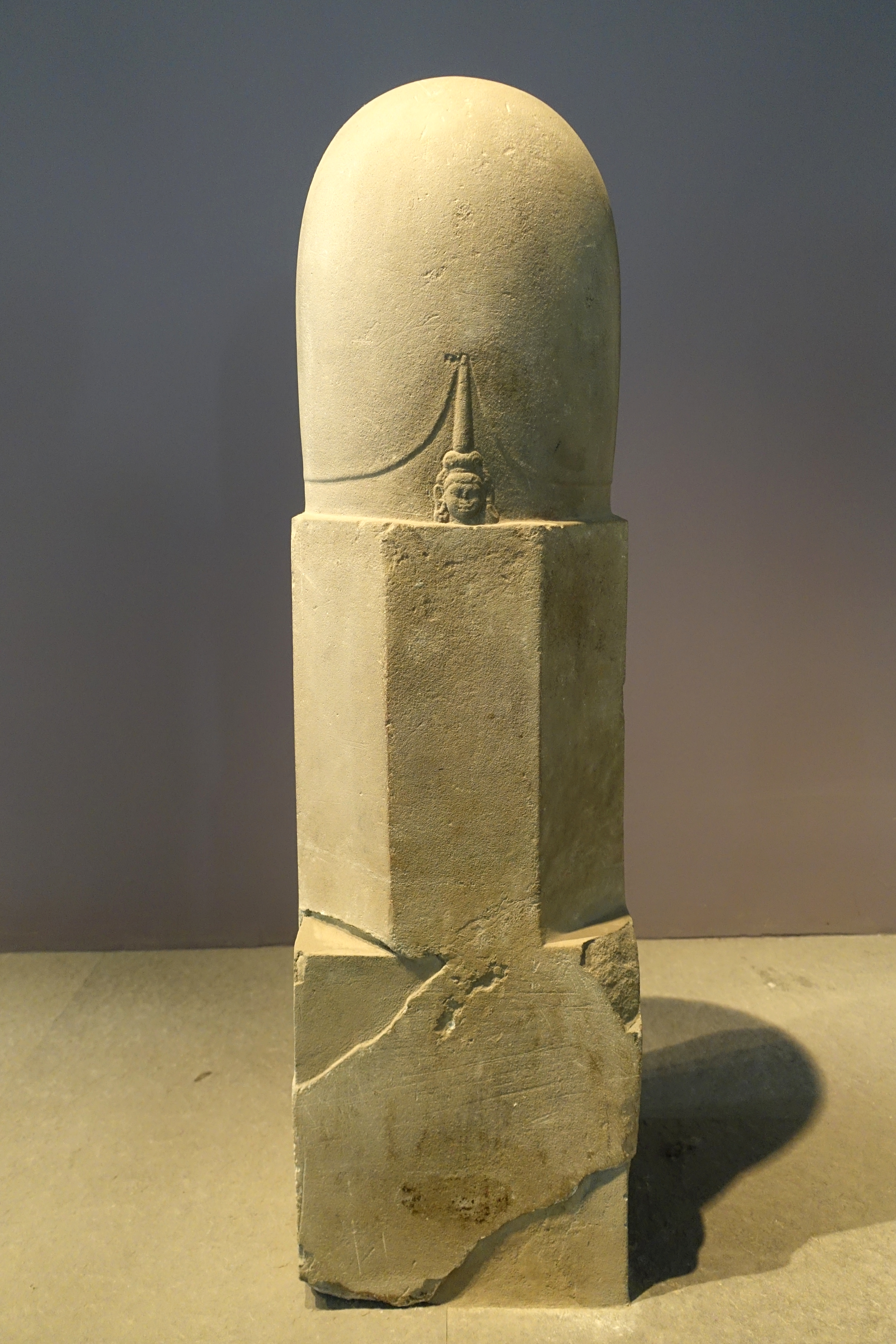
Mukhalinga of Funan found in Óc Eo, Vietnam, 6th-7th century AD

==== Phallic origins ====
Scholars, such as Wendy Doniger and Rohit Dasgupta, view linga as extrapolations of what was originally a phallic symbol.

According to Doniger, there is persuasive evidence in later Sanskrit literature that the early Indians associated the lingam icon with the male sexual organ; the 11th-century CE Kashmir text Narmamala by Kshemendra on satire and fiction writing explains his ideas on parallelism with divine lingam and human lingam in a sexual context. Various Shaiva texts, such as the Skanda Purana in section 1.8 states that all creatures have the signs of Shiva or Shakti through their lingam (male sexual organ) or pindi (female sexual organ). According to Doniger, a part of the literature corpus regards lingam to be the phallus of Shiva, while another group of texts does not. Sexuality in the former is inherently sacred and spiritual, while the latter emphasizes the ascetic nature of Shiva and renunciation to be spiritual symbolism of lingam. This tension between the pursuit of spirituality through householder lifestyle and the pursuit of renunciate sannyasi lifestyle is historic, reflects the different interpretations of the lingam and what lingam worship means to its devotees. It remains a continuing debate within Hinduism to this day, states Doniger. To one group, it is a part of Shiva's body and symbolically saguna Shiva (he in a physical form with attributes). To the other group, it is an abstract symbol of nirguna Shiva (he in the universal Absolute Reality, formless, without attributes). In Tamil Shaiva tradition, for example, the common term for lingam is kuri or "sign, mark" which is asexual. Similarly, in Lingayatism tradition, the lingam is a spiritual symbol and "was never said to have any sexual connotations", according to Doniger.

According to Dasgupta, the lingam symbolizes Shiva in Hinduism, and it is also a phallic symbol.

Some extant ancient lingams, such as the Gudimallam Lingam, unambiguously depict a male sexual organ.

==== Sexualization in Orientalist literature ====
Since the 19th century CE, states Dasgupta, the popular literature has represented the lingam as the male sex organ. This view contrasts with the traditional abstract values they represent in Shaivism wherein the lingam-yoni connote the masculine and feminine principles in the entirety of creation and all existence.

The colonial era Orientalists and Christian missionaries, raised in the Victorian mold where sex and sexual imagery were a taboo subject, were shocked by and were hostile to the lingam-yoni iconography and reverence they witnessed. The 19th and early 20th century CE colonial and missionary literature described lingam-yoni, and related theology as obscene, corrupt, licentious, hyper-sexualized, puerile, impure, demonic and a culture that had become too feminine and dissolute. To the Hindus, particularly the Shaivites, these icons and ideas were the abstract, a symbol of the entirety of creation and spirituality. The colonial disparagement in part triggered the opposite reaction from Bengali nationalists, who more explicitly valorised the feminine. Swami Vivekananda called for the revival of the Mother Goddess as a feminine force, inviting his countrymen to "proclaim her to all the world with the voice of peace and benediction".

According to Doniger, the terms lingam and yoni became explicitly associated with human sexual organs in the western imagination after the widely popular first Kamasutra translation by Sir Richard Burton in 1883. In his translation, even though the original Sanskrit text does not use the words lingam or yoni for sexual organs, and almost always uses other terms, Burton adroitly avoided being viewed as obscene to the Victorian mindset by avoiding the use of words such as penis, vulva, vagina and other direct or indirect sexual terms in the Sanskrit text to discuss sex, sexual relationships and human sexual positions. Burton used the terms lingam and yoni instead throughout the translation. This conscious and incorrect word substitution, states Doniger, thus served as an Orientalist means to "anthropologize sex, distance it, make it safe for English readers by assuring them, or pretending to assure them, that the text was not about real sexual organs, their sexual organs, but merely about the appendages of weird, dark people far away." Similar Orientalist literature of the Christian missionaries and the British era, states Doniger, stripped all spiritual meanings and insisted on the Victorian vulgar interpretation only, which had "a negative effect on the self-perception that Hindus had of their own bodies" and they became "ashamed of the more sensual aspects of their own religious literature". Some contemporary Hindus, states Doniger, in their passion to spiritualize Hinduism and for their Hindutva campaign have sought to sanitize the historic earthly sexual meanings, and insist on the abstract spiritual meaning only.

==== Rejection ====
The sexualization is criticized by Stella Kramrisch and Moriz Winternitz who opines that the lingam in the Shiva tradition is "only a symbol of the productive and creative principle of nature as embodied in Shiva", and it has no historical trace in any obscene phallic cult.

According to Alex Wayman, various works on Shaivism by some Indian authors, following the Shaiva philosophical texts and spiritual interpretations, "deny that the linga is a phallus." To the Shaivites, a linga is neither a phallus nor do they practice the worship of erotic penis-vulva, rather the linga-yoni is a symbol of cosmic mysteries, the creative powers and the metaphor for the spiritual truths of their faith.

According to Swami Sivananda, the correlation of the linga and phallus is wrong; the lingam is only the external symbol of Shiva's formless being. He further states that it is the light or power of consciousness, manifesting from Sadashiva.

The popular belief is that the Siva Lingam represents the phallus or the virile organ, the emblem of the generative power or principle in nature. This is not only a serious mistake but a grave blunder. In the post-Vedic period, the Linga has become symbolic of the generative power of Lord Siva. Linga is the differentiating mark. It is certainly not the sex mark.

== Worship ==
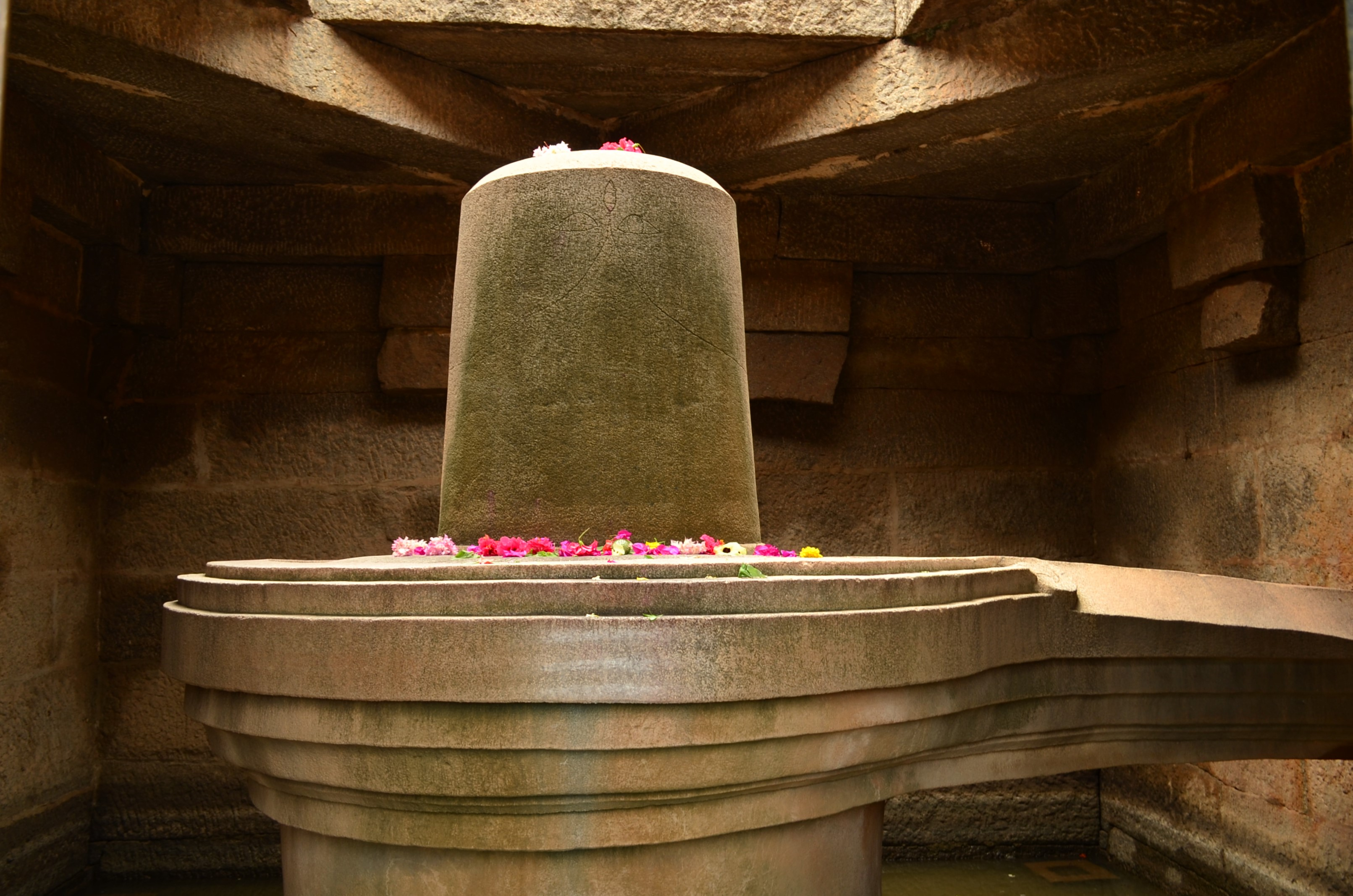
Badavlinga, Hampi (Vijayanagara Empire)

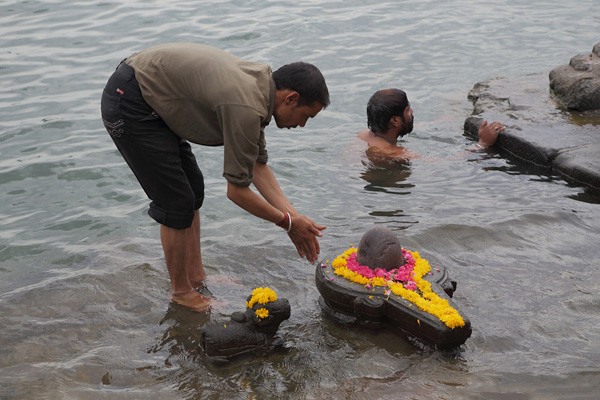
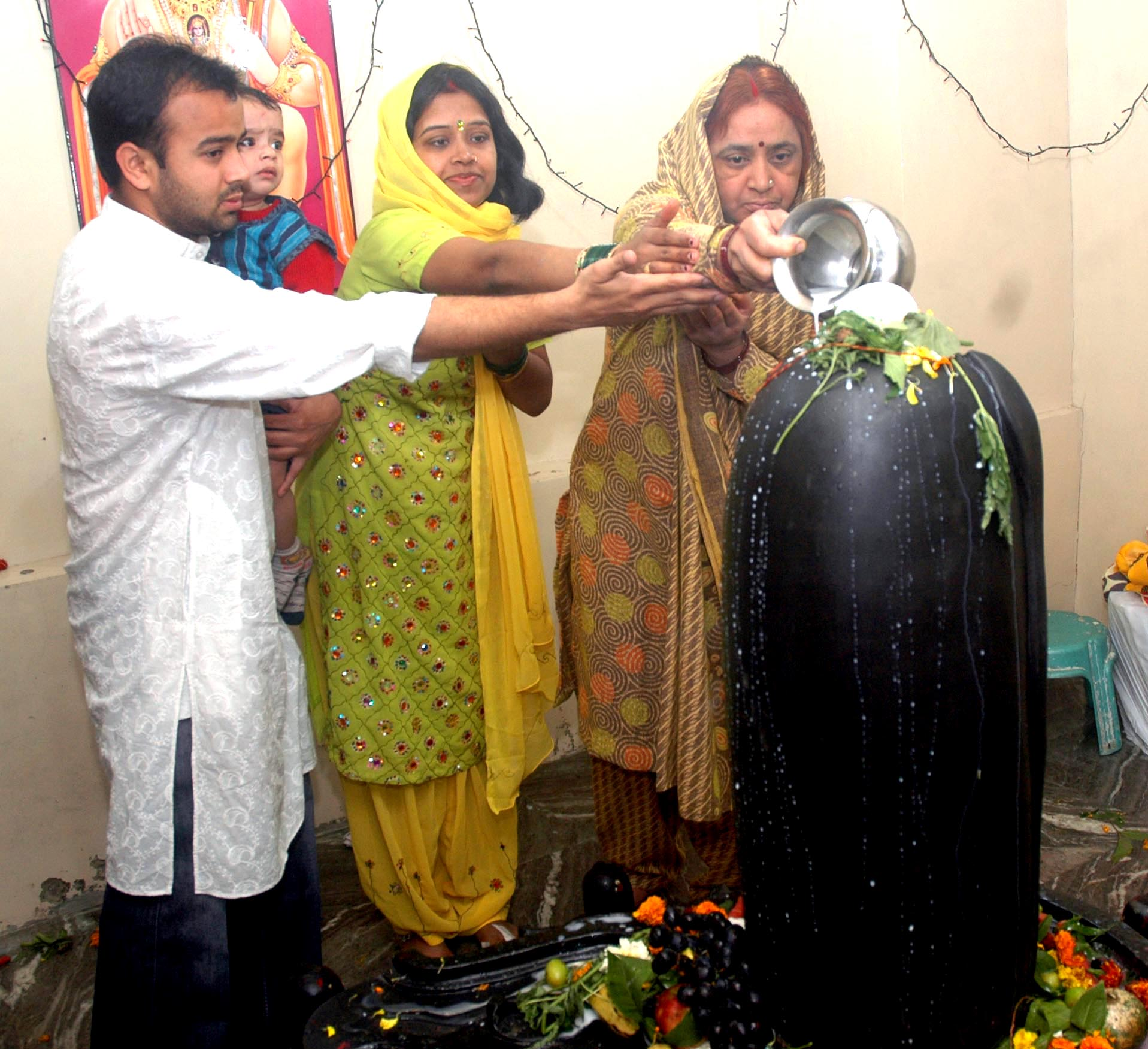
Linga-yoni worship in different ways; Left: river, Right: temple.

The traditional lingam rituals in major Shiva temples includes offerings of flowers, grass, dried rice, fruits, leaves, water and a milk bath. Priests chant hymns, while the devotees go to the sanctum for a darshana followed by a clockwise circumambulation of the sanctum. On the sanctum walls, typically are reliefs of Dakshinamurti, Brahma, Vishnu, Shiva. Often, near the sanctum are other shrines, particularly for Shakti (Durga), Ganesha and Murugan (Kartikeya). In the Hindu tradition, special pilgrimage sites include those where natural lingams are found in the form of cylindrical rocks or ice or rocky hill. These are called Svayambhuva lingam, and about 70 of these are known on the Indian subcontinent, the most significant being one in Kashi (Varanasi) followed by Prayaga, Naimisha and Gaya.

== Historical development and meaning ==
=== Archeological finds from Indus Valley civilisation ===
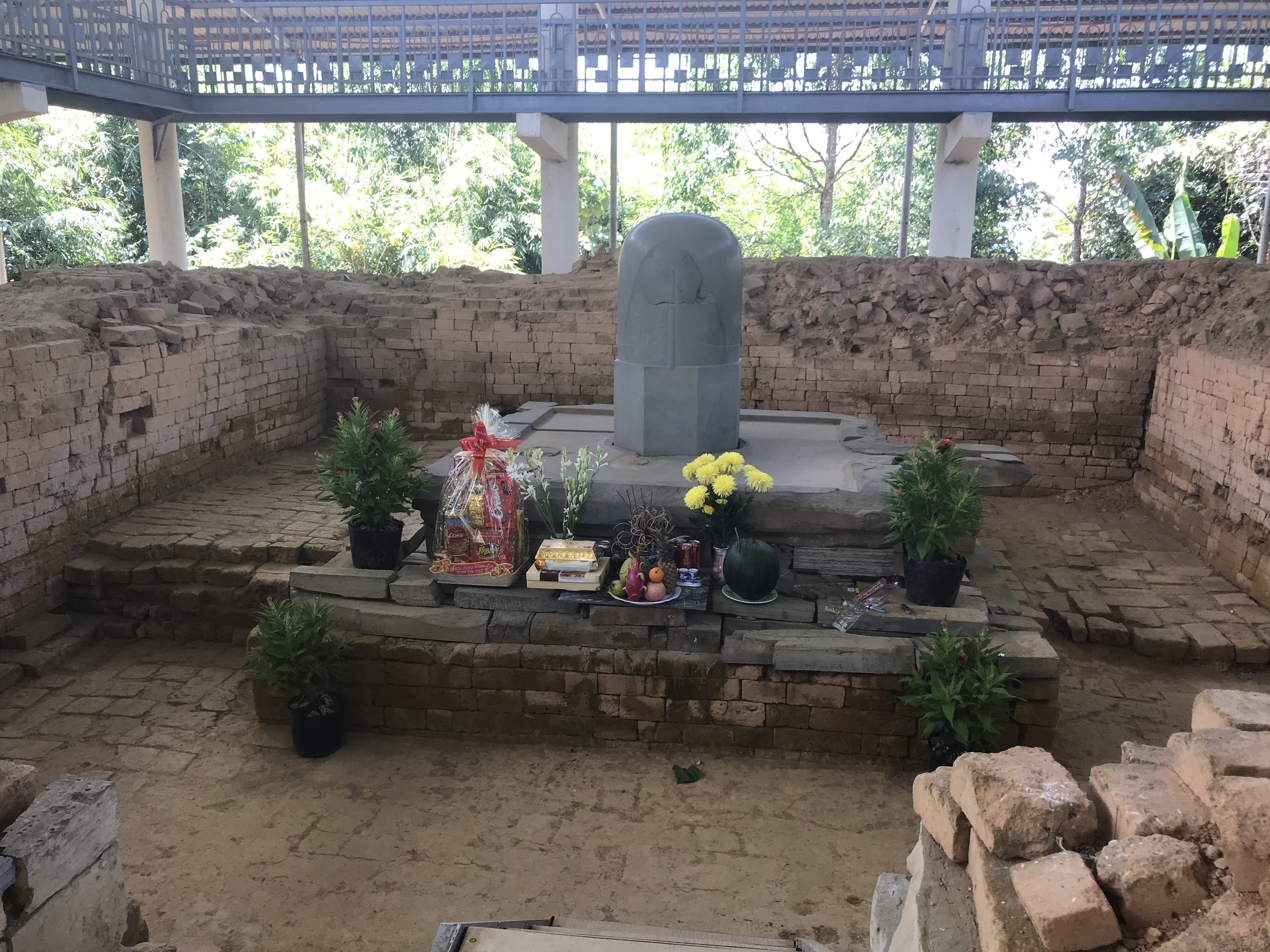
Stone lingam and yoni pedestal found in Cát Tiên, Vietnam, circa 8th century CE. At 2.1 meter tall, this is the largest lingam ever found in Southeast Asia

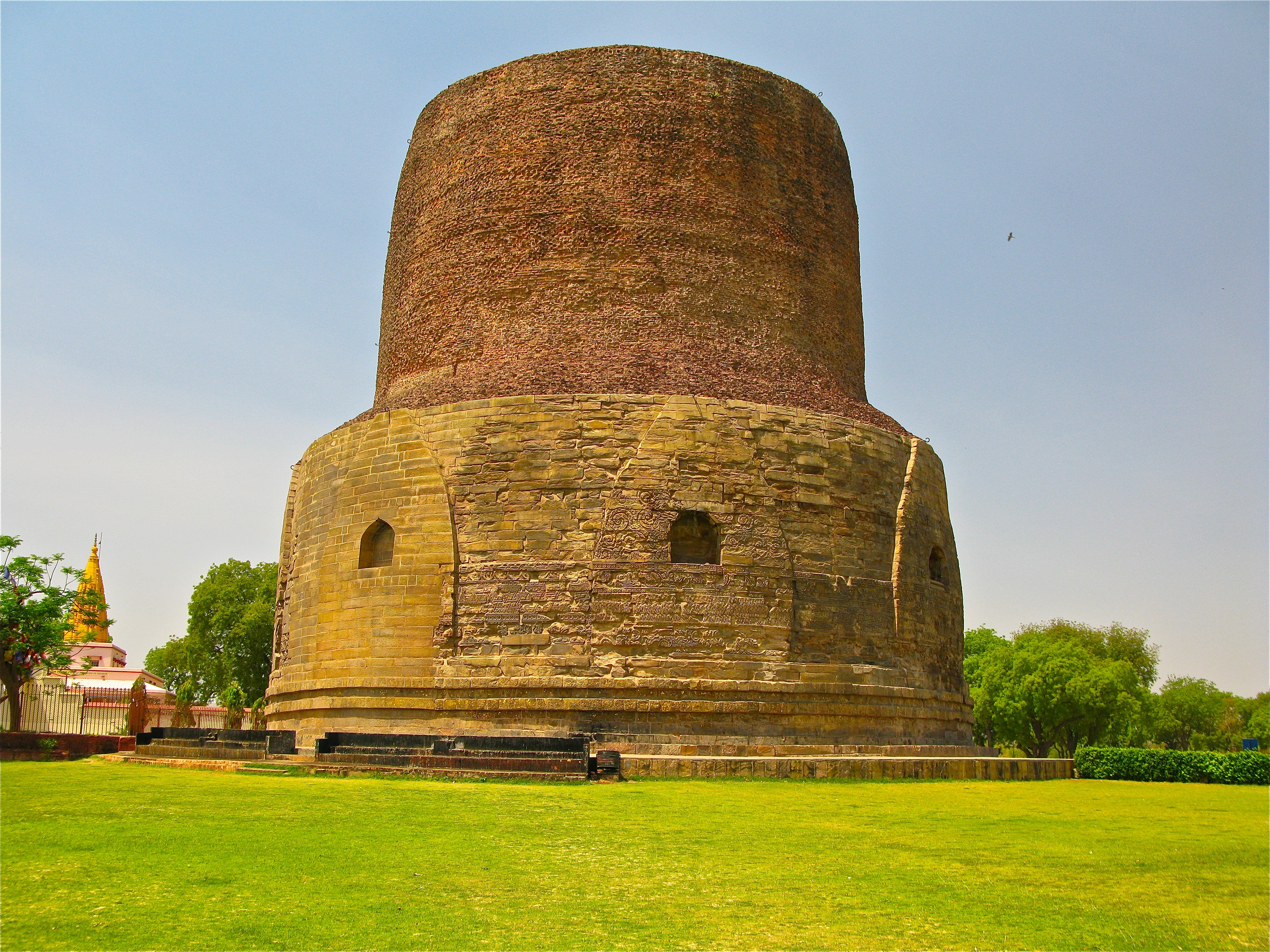
A Buddhist stupa (above) may have influenced the later iconography of the Hindu Shiva-linga, according to Swami Vivekananda. (Note: This view is shared by K.R. Subramanian, who writes that some Buddhist stupas have been worshipped by Tamil Saivites because they believe it is a Shivalinga, and some ancient stupa sculptures from Amaravati and Jaggayyapeta look so much like a linga that anyone would mistake them for one.)

The colonial-era archaeologists John Marshall and Ernest Mackay proposed that certain artifacts found at Harappan sites may be evidence of yoni-linga worship in Indus Valley Civilization. Jones and Ryan state that lingam/yoni shapes have been recovered from the archaeological sites at Harappa and Mohenjo-daro, part of the Indus Valley civilisation. According to Chakravarti, "some of the stones found in Mohenjodaro are unmistakably phallic stones". These are dated to some time before 2300 BCE. Similarly, states Chakravarti, the Kalibangan site of Harappa has a small terracotta representation that "would undoubtedly be considered the replica of a modern Shivlinga [a tubular stone]." According to Srinivasan, in the Harappan sites, objects that resemble "lingam" have been found. That includes "a seated trident-headed ithyphallic figure", which was found on Indus seals, "has been compared to Shiva as meditating ascetic", states Srinivasan.

According to Encyclopædia Britannica, while Harappan discoveries include "short cylindrical pillars with rounded tops", there is no evidence that the people of Indus Valley Civilization worshipped these artifacts as lingams.

Scholars such as Arthur Llewellyn Basham dispute whether such artifacts discovered at the archaeological sites of Indus Valley sites are yoni.

According to the Indologist Asko Parpola, "it is true that Marshall's and Mackay's hypotheses of linga and yoni worship by the Harappans has rested on rather slender grounds, and that for instance, the interpretation of the so-called ring-stones as yonis seems untenable". He quotes Dales 1984 paper, which states "with the single exception of the unidentified photography of a realistic phallic object in Marshall's report, there is no archaeological evidence to support claims of special sexually-oriented aspects of Harappan religion". However, adds Parpola, a re-examination at Indus Valley sites suggest that the Mackay's hypothesis cannot be ruled out because erotic and sexual scenes such as ithyphallic males, naked females, a human couple having intercourse and trefoil imprints have now been identified at the Harappan sites. The "finely polished circular stand" found by Mackay may be yoni although it was found without the linga. The absence of linga, states Parpola, maybe because it was made from wood which did not survive.

Indologist Wendy Doniger rejects Srinivasan's interpretation, and states that this relatively rare artifact can be interpreted in many ways and has unduly been used for wild speculations such as being a linga. Another Indus stamp seal often called the Pashupati seal, states Doniger, has an image with a general resemblance with Shiva and "the Indus people may well have created the symbolism of the divine phallus", but given the available evidence we cannot be certain, nor do we know that it had the same meaning as some currently project them to might have meant.

=== Vedic texts ===
==== Vedas ====
The word lingam is not found in the Rigveda, or the other Vedas. However, Rudra (proto-Shiva) is found in the Vedic literature.

Worship of the lingam was not a part of the Vedic religion. The worship of the lingam originated from the famous hymn in the Atharva Veda Samhita sung in praise of the Yupa-Stambha, the sacrificial post. In that hymn, a description is found of the beginningless and endless Stambha or Skambha, and it is shown that the said Skambha is put in place of the eternal Brahman. Just as the Yajna (sacrificial) fire, its smoke, ashes, and flames, the Soma plant, and the ox that used to carry on its back the wood for the Vedic sacrifice gave place to the conceptions of the brightness of Shiva's body, his tawny matted hair, his blue throat, and the riding on the bull of the Shiva, the Yupa-Skambha gave place in time to the Shiva-Linga. In the text Linga Purana, the same hymn is expanded in the shape of stories, meant to establish the glory of the great Stambha and the superiority of Shiva as Mahadeva.

There is a hymn in the Atharvaveda that praises a pillar (stambha), and this is one possible origin of linga worship. According to Swami Vivekananda, the Shiva-linga had origins in the idea of Yupa-Stambha or Skambha of the Vedic rituals, where the term meant the sacrificial post which was then idealized as the eternal Brahman. The Yupa-Skambha gave place in time to the Shiva-Linga, quite possibly with influence from Buddhism's stupa shaped like the top of a stone linga, according to Vivekananda.

==== Shvetashvatara Upanishad ====
Shvetashvatara Upanishad states that, of the three significations of Lingam, the primary one is "the imperishable Purusha", the absolute reality, whereby the linga is "sign", a mark that provides the existence of Brahman, which is itself formless. Furthermore, it mentioned that Shiva is transcendent, beyond any characteristic or liūga, specifically the sign of gender. Linga, "sign", not only signifies the existence of perceptible "things" but also denotes the imperceptible essence of "a thing" or pieces of Brahman called Atma even before that thing has come to exist in any concrete form. (Note: The form of fire, which exists in the kindling stick in a latent form, may not be seen, yet its linga is not destroyed but be seized again by another kindling stick. Fire in its latent condition, unkindled, the potential of fire, its imperceptible essence, is the liūga of fire, in contrast with and indispensable to its visible form (Rūpa).) The imperceptible essence of "a thing", in its potentiality, is the liūga of the thing.

The insight of the Shvetashvatara Upanishad conveyed through the word liūga is formulated explicitly in Samkhya and schools of Yoga or ways of looking at things, that is, looking at their appearance and at Ultimate Reality. Liūga here denotes the subtle body, (liṇga śarīra) underlying and ontologically preceding anything perceptible. The perceptible state, in this context, is the gross body (sthūla śarīra), or concrete reality as it appears to the sense organs. In between the Ultimate and concrete reality is Prakṛti, also called Pradhana which is the imperceptible substratum of the manifest world or pre-matter. Out of this imperceptible cosmic substance, all things have come out, and to which they will return ultimately.

=== Early iconography and temples (3rd century BCE - first mill. CE) ===
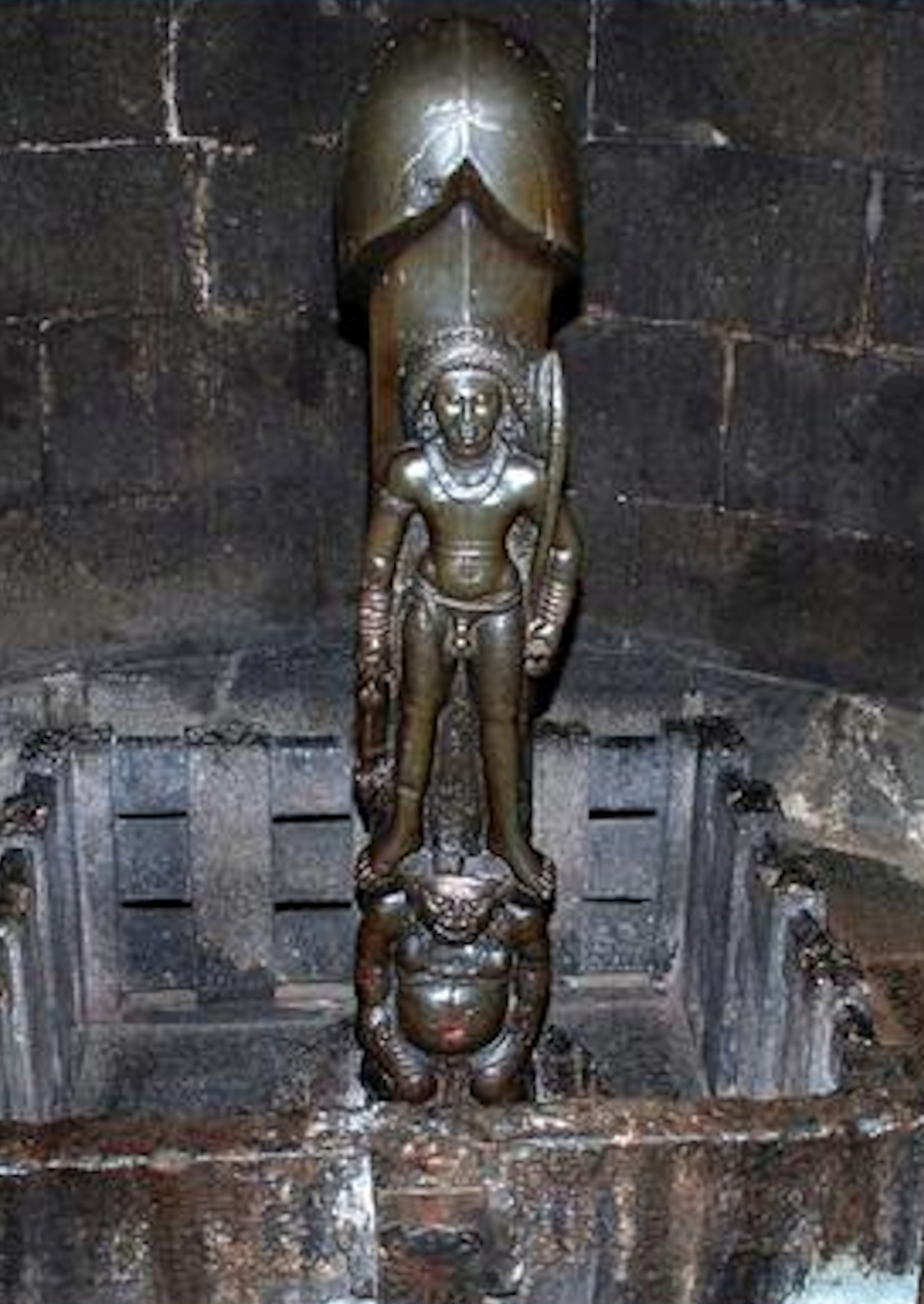
Gudimallam Lingam

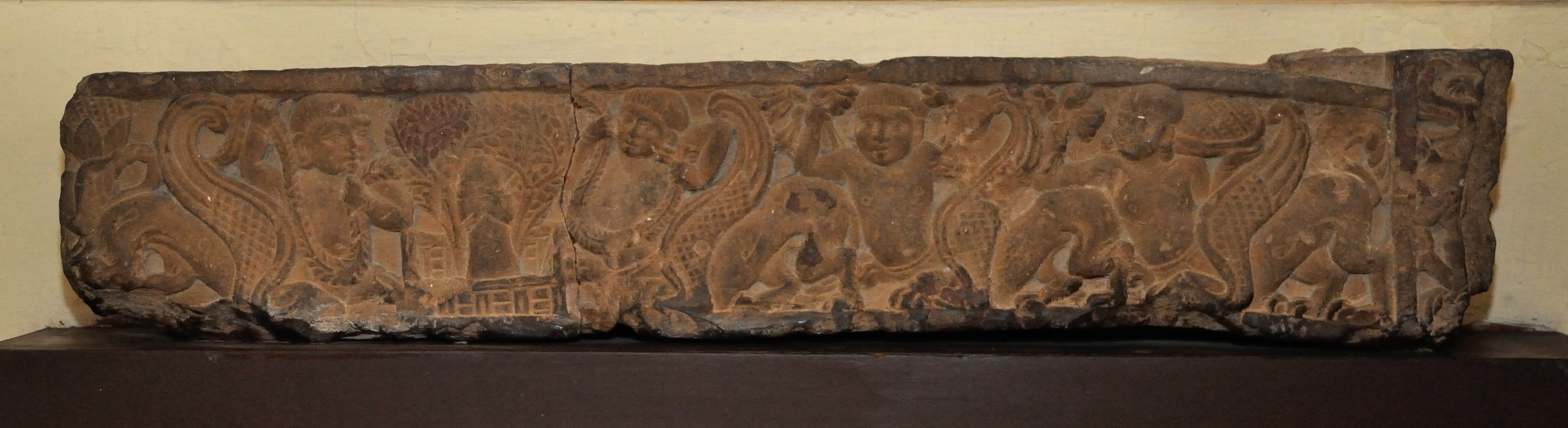
Linga inside a railing (left), being worshipped by Gandharva winged creatures. Art of Mathura, circa 100 BCE.

The Gudimallam Lingam, one of the oldest examples of a lingam, is still in worship in the Parashurameshwara temple, Gudimallam, in a hilly forest about 20 kilometres (12 mi) east of Tirupati in Andhra Pradesh. It has been dated to the 3rd-century BCE, or to the 2nd century BCE, and is mostly accepted to be from the 3rd- to 1st-century BCE, though some later dates have been proposed. The stone lingam is clearly a representation of an anatomically accurate phallus, with a figure of Lakulisha, the ascetic manifestation of Shiva, carved on the front, holding an antelope and axe in his hands. He stands on top of a Apasmara (demon) dwarf, who symbolizes spiritual ignorance, greed, sensual desires or Kama and nonsensical speech on the spiritual path, hence must be subdued in spiritual pursuits.

In this earliest representation, the phallic representation illustrates the centrality of the energetic principle of Urdhva Retas (Sanskrit: ऊर्ध्वरेतस् IAST: Ūrdhvaretas, lit. "ascent of vital energies or fluid") the upward flow of energy in spiritual pursuits and practice of celibacy (Brahmacarya), contrary to fertility or release of vital energies. Lakulisa as an ascetic manifestation of Shiva is seen in later peninsular Indian scriptures whose ithyphallic aspects connotes asceticism and conserved procreative potentialities (Brahmacarya or celibacy), rather than mere eroticism. According to Stella Kramrisch, the pictorial symbol of the Gudimallam Lingam should not be mistaken for fertility or eroticism, due to incomplete or impure understanding of the underlying refined principles. (Note: Kramrisch claims that the representation of the phallic shape in the Gudimallam Lingam does not represent sexuality. It represents "seminal retention" and practice of celibacy (Brahmacarya) (illustration of Urdhva Retas), and represents Shiva as "he stands for complete control of the senses, and for the supreme carnal renunciation".) (Note: Furthermore, the phallic shape, standing erect, always negates its function as an organ of procreation. Rather, the shape or pictorial representation is conveying that, the seed was channeled upward, not ejected for the sake of generation, but was reversed, retained and absorbed for regeneration as creative energy.)

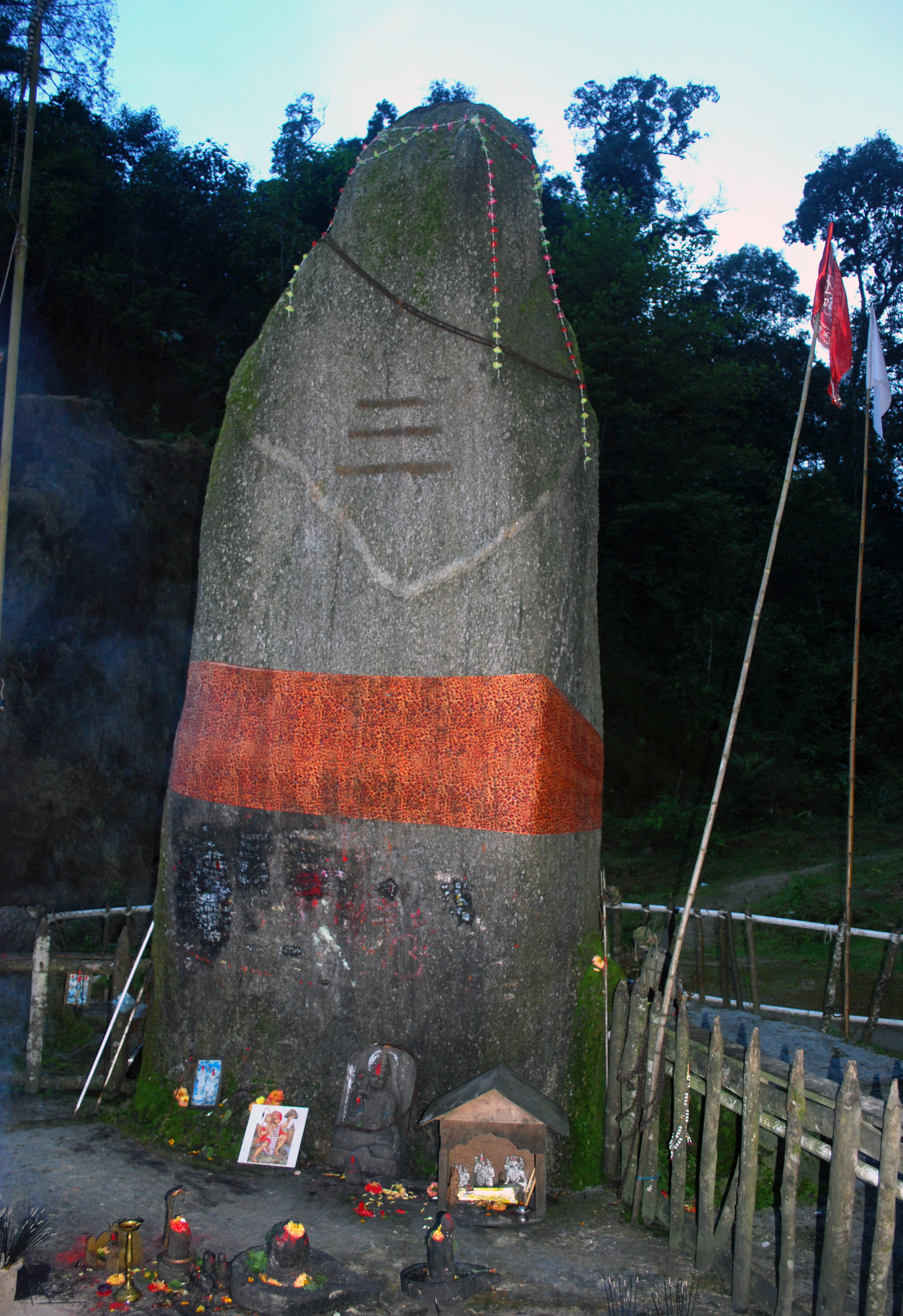
Natural rock linga, Arunachal Pradesh

The Bhita linga – now at the Lucknow museum – is also dated to about the 2nd century BCE, and has four directional faces on the pillar and a Brahmi script inscription at the bottom. Above the four faces, the Bhita linga has the bust of a male with his left hand holding a vase and the right hand in the abhaya (no-fear) mudra. (Note: This linga is likely a dedication memorial stone according to the inscription which states, "The Linga of the sons of Khajahuti, was dedicated by Nagasiri, the son of Vasethi. May the deity be pleased." Bloch objected to "Linga of the sons" interpretation, stating it made no sense. Other scholars maintain that to be a cryptic epigraphic reference to "worshipped by", given the mention of "deity" later in the inscription.) The pillar itself is, once again, a realistic depiction of phallus but neither symbolizes fertility nor sexuality, but the refined energetic principles of Urdhva Retas (Note: In the practice of seminal retention through self-discipline and Sādhanā, the mind is stirred, but not by external stimuli, but the result of realisation of true nature of the Self in the path of liberation (moksha). However, due to lack of understanding of the iconography of Lingam, the representation is often misunderstood.) during Sannyasa or Asceticism.

The Mathura archaeological site has revealed similar lingams, with a standing Shiva in front (2nd century CE) and with one or four faces around the pillar (1st century CE to 3rd century CE).

Numerous stone and cave temples from the mid to late 1st millennium feature lingams. The Bhumara Temple near Satna Madhya Pradesh, for example, is generally dated to late 5th-century Gupta Empire era, and it features an Ekamukha Lingam.

=== Epics and puranas ===
==== Mahabharata ====
According to Wendy Doniger, lingam in the Mahabharata is represented as the phallic form which suggests Sthula sarira of Shiva, although not the primary significance, however it connotes much more than that. The anthropomorphic shape, in this specific context, functions as the "subtle body" (Lińga Śarīra) of Shiva in the Mahabharata. It is a superabundant evocation of fierce potency on a cosmic scale, although it states crassly phallic. Doniger further finds that Shiva was called by many names, including Rudra or Girisha. Chapter 10.17 of the Mahabharata also refers to the word sthanu in the sense of an "inanimate pillar" as well as a "name of Shiva, signifying the immobile, ascetic, desexualized form of the lingam", as it recites the legend involving Shiva, Brahma, Brahma as Prajapati. This mythology weaves two polarities, one where the lingam represents the potentially procreative phallus (fertile lingam) and its opposite "a pillar-like renouncer of sexuality" (ascetic lingam), states Doniger.

==== Puranas ====
The Linga Purana (5th century CE -10th century CE) states, "Shiva is signless, without color, taste, smell, that is beyond word or touch, without quality, motionless and changeless". The source of the universe is the signless, and all of the universe is the manifested Linga, a union of unchanging principle and the ever changing nature. The Linga Purana and Siva Gita texts builds on this foundation. Linga, states Alain Daniélou, means sign. It is an important concept in Hindu texts, wherein Linga is a manifested sign and nature of someone or something. It accompanies the concept of Brahman, which as invisible signless and existent Principle, is formless or linga-less.

According to the Linga Purana, the lingam is a complete symbolic representation of the formless Universe Bearer – the oval-shaped stone is the symbol of the Universe, and the bottom base represents the Supreme Power that holds the entire Universe in it. A similar interpretation is also found in the Skanda Purana: "The endless sky (that great void which contains the entire universe) is the Linga, the Earth is its base. At the end of time the entire universe and all the Gods finally merge in the Linga itself." In the Linga Purana, an Atharvaveda hymn is expanded with stories about the great Stambha and the supreme nature of Mahâdeva (the Great God, Shiva).

According to Shiva Purana (10th century CE - 11th century CE), the legend about the origin of the phallic form of Shiva is that some brahmin devotees of Shiva were highly engrossed in the meditation of Shiva. In the meantime, Shiva came in a hideous naked ascetic form with ashes smeared all over his body holding his phallus, to test the devotion of his devotees. The wives of the sages were scared at this sight but some embraced the holy ascetic. Although Shiva put them to test, the sages and wives did not recognize him. The sages were stupefied and deluded by Śiva's power of illusion, māyā, became infuriated at this sight and cursed the ascetic form of Shiva: "You are acting pervertedly. This violates the Vedic path. Hence let your penis fall on the ground.” (Note: Although the sages were also ascetics, only because they observed established conventions, they failed when Shiva tested them with his outrageous ways. The purpose of Shiva's visit to the hermitage, the place where the sages were living with their wives, was to enlighten the false sages by allowing them to humiliate him. But the sages were lost in anger, but Shiva allowed himself to be humiliated in the image that met the eye of the sages. Even though Shiva excited some of them as the source of their desire, they were unable to see him as the killer of desires. Although Shiva revealed his true nature by his dance (Tandava), yet so great was his power of illusion (māyā), the deluded sages did not recognize him. That falling phallus burnt everything in front; wherever it went it began to burn everything there. It went to all three Hindu worlds (hell, heaven, earth). All the worlds and the people were distressed. The sages could not recognise it as Shiva and sought refuge from Brahma. Brahma answered that they should pray to Parvati to assume a form of vaginal passage, and perform a procedure reciting vedic mantras and decorating the penis with flowers etc., so that the penis would become steady. As the phallus was held by Parvati in that form, an auspicion arrow formed. The pedestal shaped as the vagina and the phallus fixed therein are symbolic of the eternal creative forces personified as Śivā and Śiva. After the procedure was completed, the penis became static. This phallus was known as "hatesa" and "Siva Siva". In one version of the story found in Vamana Purana, Shiva's visit to the hermitage in Deodar forests was an act of grace at Parvati's request.)

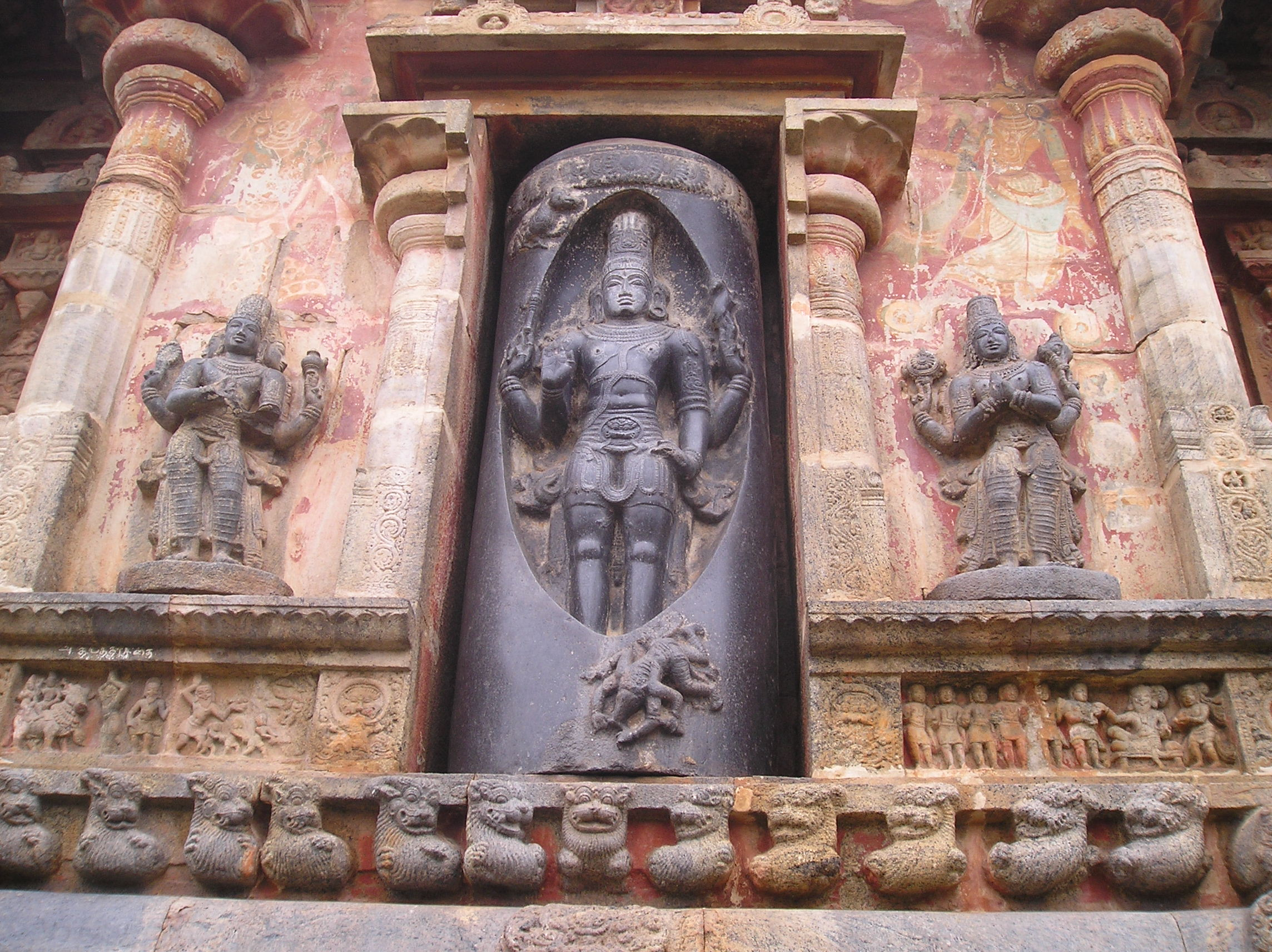
Lingodbhava is a Shaiva sectarian icon where Shiva is depicted rising from the Lingam (an infinite fiery pillar) that narrates how Shiva is the foremost of the Trimurti; Brahma on the left and Vishnu on the right are depicted bowing to Shiva in the centre.

The Shiva Purana also describes the origin of the lingam, known as Shiva-linga, as the beginning-less and endless cosmic pillar (Stambha) of fire, the cause of all causes. Shiva is pictured as emerging from the lingam – the cosmic pillar of fire – proving his superiority over the gods Brahma and Vishnu. It also describes right way to worship Shiva linga in its 11th chapter in detail This is known as Lingodbhava. The Linga Purana also supports this interpretation of lingam as a cosmic pillar, symbolizing the infinite nature of Shiva.

=== Muslim rule ===
In the 11th-century CE, after conquests of the subcontinent by Muslim rulers, several sultans of Delhi, often iconoclastic, regarded the lingam as a sexual and anthropomorphic statue of Shiva, and ordered as many be destroyed as possible and destroyed them all off then after. In some situations, the linga were deliberately laid at the thresholds of mosques for public usage and incorporated into Islamic architecture, notably at a mosque in Banbhore.

== Lingayatism ==
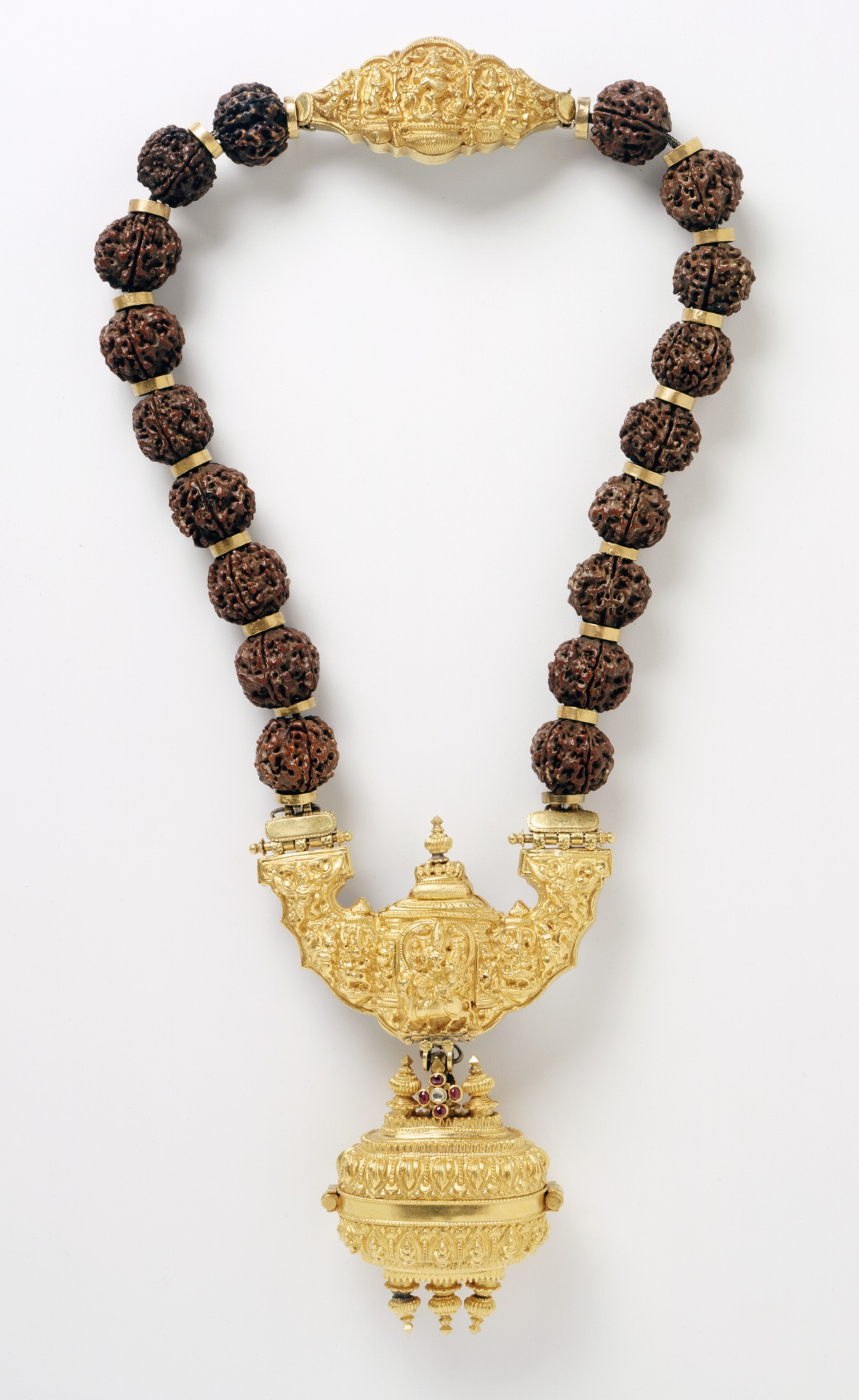
A necklace with linga-containing pendant is constantly worn by the Lingayats.

Lingayats, a sect of the Shaivite religious tradition in India, wear a miniaturized linga called the istalinga. Lingayats wear a lingam inside a necklace, called Ishtalinga. Initially known as Veerashaivas (heroic worshippers of Shiva), since the 18th century CE adherents of this faith are known as Lingayats. This tradition originated in Karnataka around the 12th-century CE. Lingayatism is derived from the term linga and suffix ayta. The term Lingayat is based on the practice of both genders of Lingayats wearing an iṣṭaliṅga (also called karasthala-linga) contained inside a box with a necklace all the time. The istalinga is a personalized and miniature oval-shaped linga and an emblem of their faith symbolising Parashiva, the absolute reality and their spirituality. It is viewed as a "living, moving" divinity within the Lingayat devotee. Every day, the devotee removes this personal linga from its box, places it in left palm, offers puja and then meditates about becoming one with the linga, in his or her journey towards the atma-linga.

== Pilgrimage sites ==
An ice lingam at Amarnath in the western Himalayas forms every winter from ice dripping on the floor of a cave and freezing like a stalagmite. It is very popular with pilgrims.

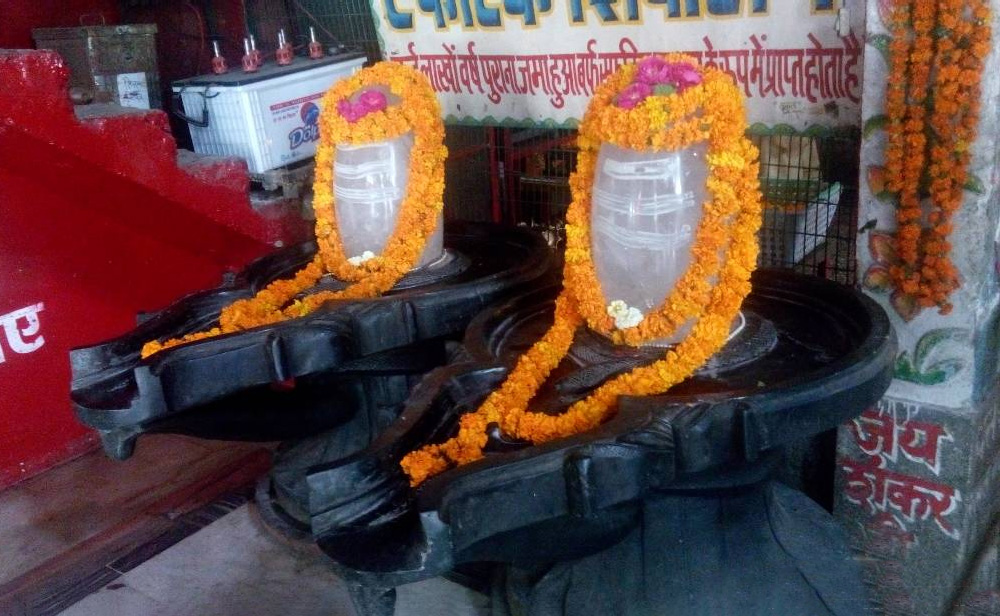
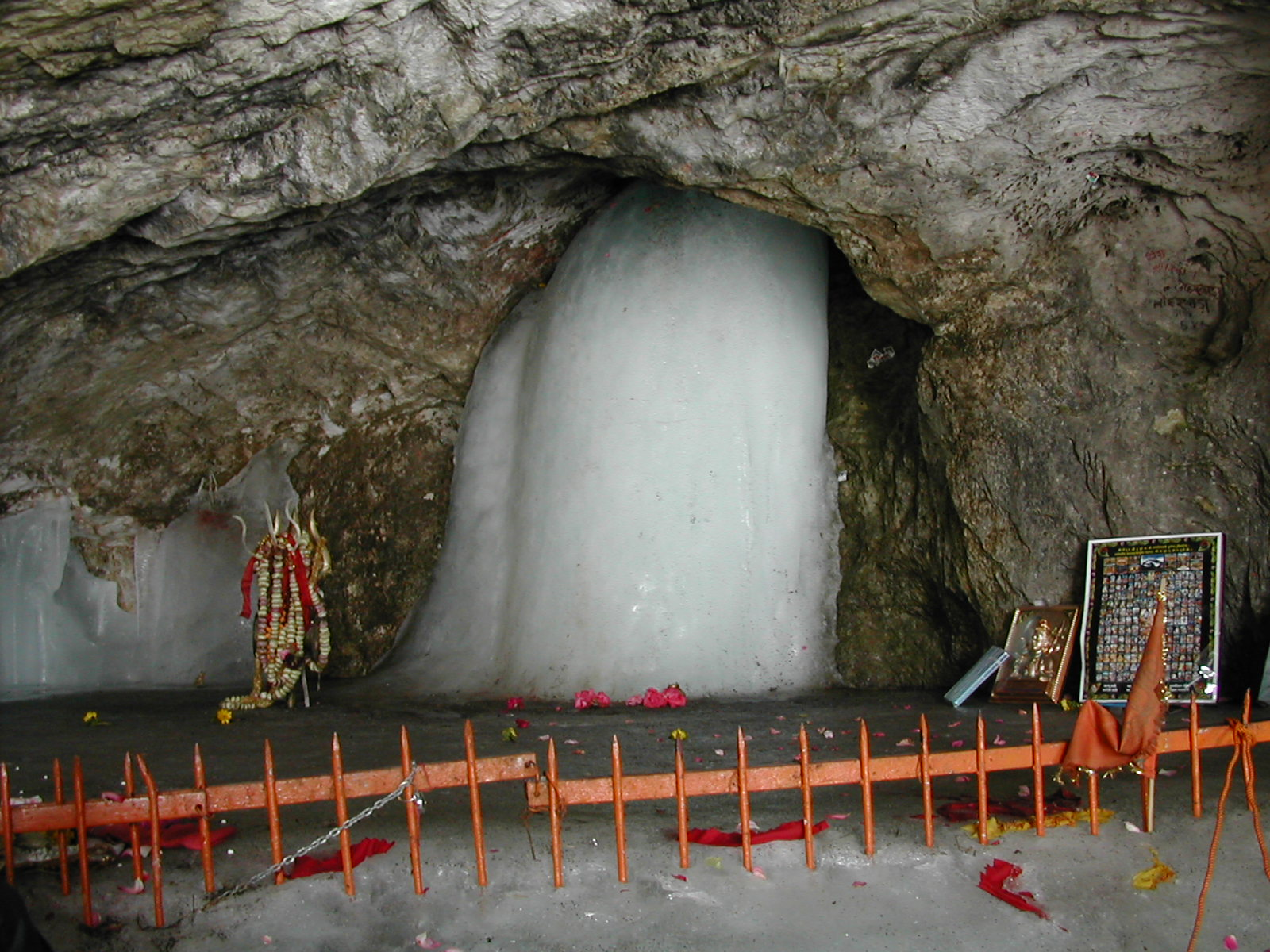
Left: 2 sphatika (quartz) lingams in the Shri Parkasheshwar Mahadev Temple, Dehradun; Right: Ice Lingam in the cave at the Amarnath Temple, Kashmir.

In Kadavul Temple, a 700-pound, 3-foot-tall, naturally formed Sphatika (quartz) lingam is installed. In the future, this crystal lingam will be housed in the Iraivan Temple. It is claimed as among the largest known sphatika self formed (Swayambhu) lingams. Hindu scripture rates crystal as the highest form of Shiva lingam.

Shivling, 6,543 metres (21,467 ft), is a mountain in Uttarakhand (the Garhwal region of Himalayas). It arises as a sheer pyramid above the snout of the Gangotri Glacier. The mountain resembles a Shiva lingam when viewed from certain angles, especially when travelling or trekking from Gangotri to Gomukh as part of a traditional Hindu pilgrimage.

A lingam is also the basis for the formation legend (and name) of the Borra Caves in Andhra Pradesh.

Banalinga are the lingam which are found on the bed of the Narmada River.

Lesser known Bhooteshwarnath Mahadeva in Gariaband district of Chhattisgarh is a rock Shivlinga and said to be the Largest Natural Shivlinga in the world, whose height is increasing with each passing year.

The tallest Shiva lingam in the world is located at Chenkal village in Thiruvananthapuram district in the state of Kerala, India.

== Gallery ==
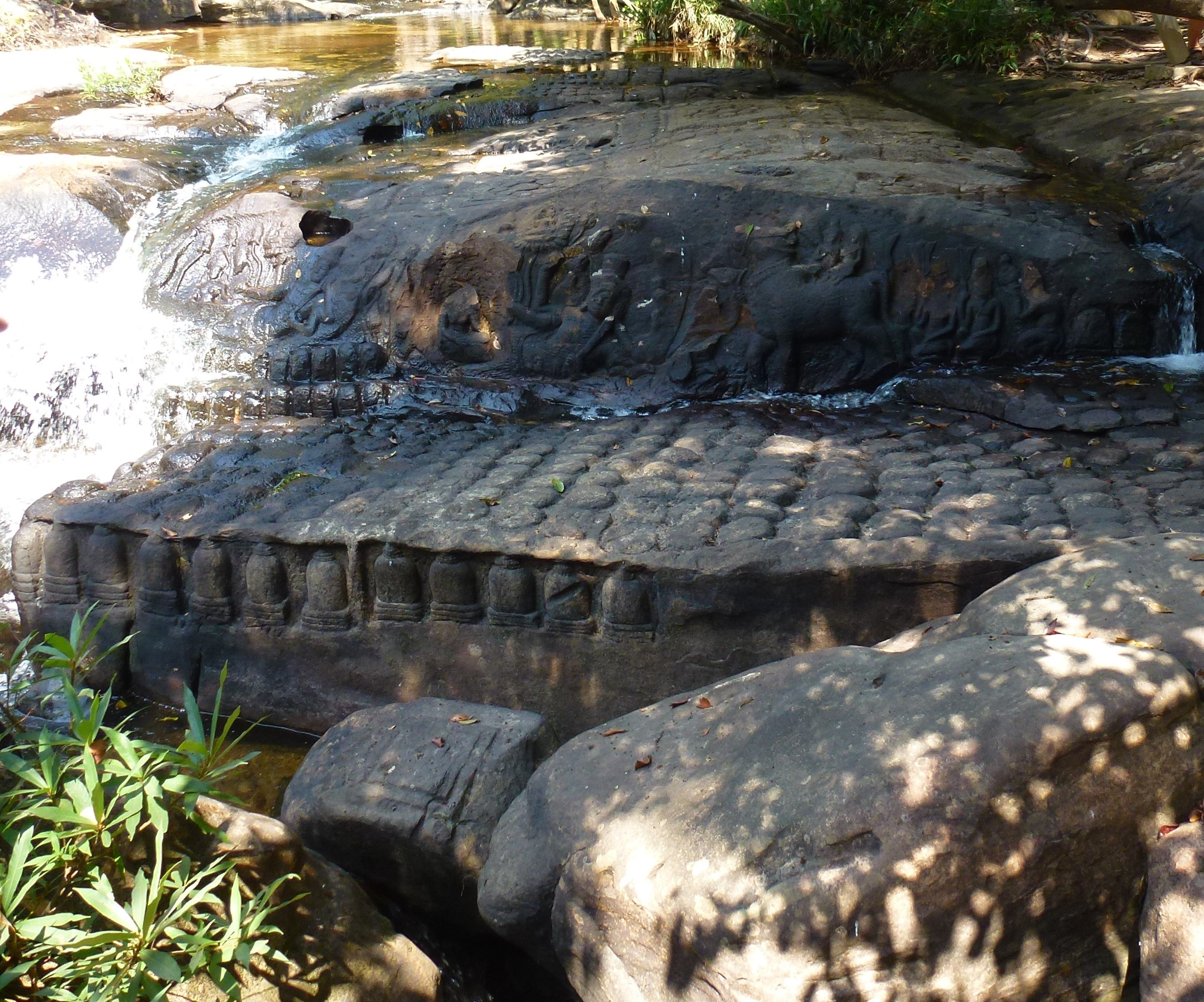
Lingam at Kbal Spean, Cambodia

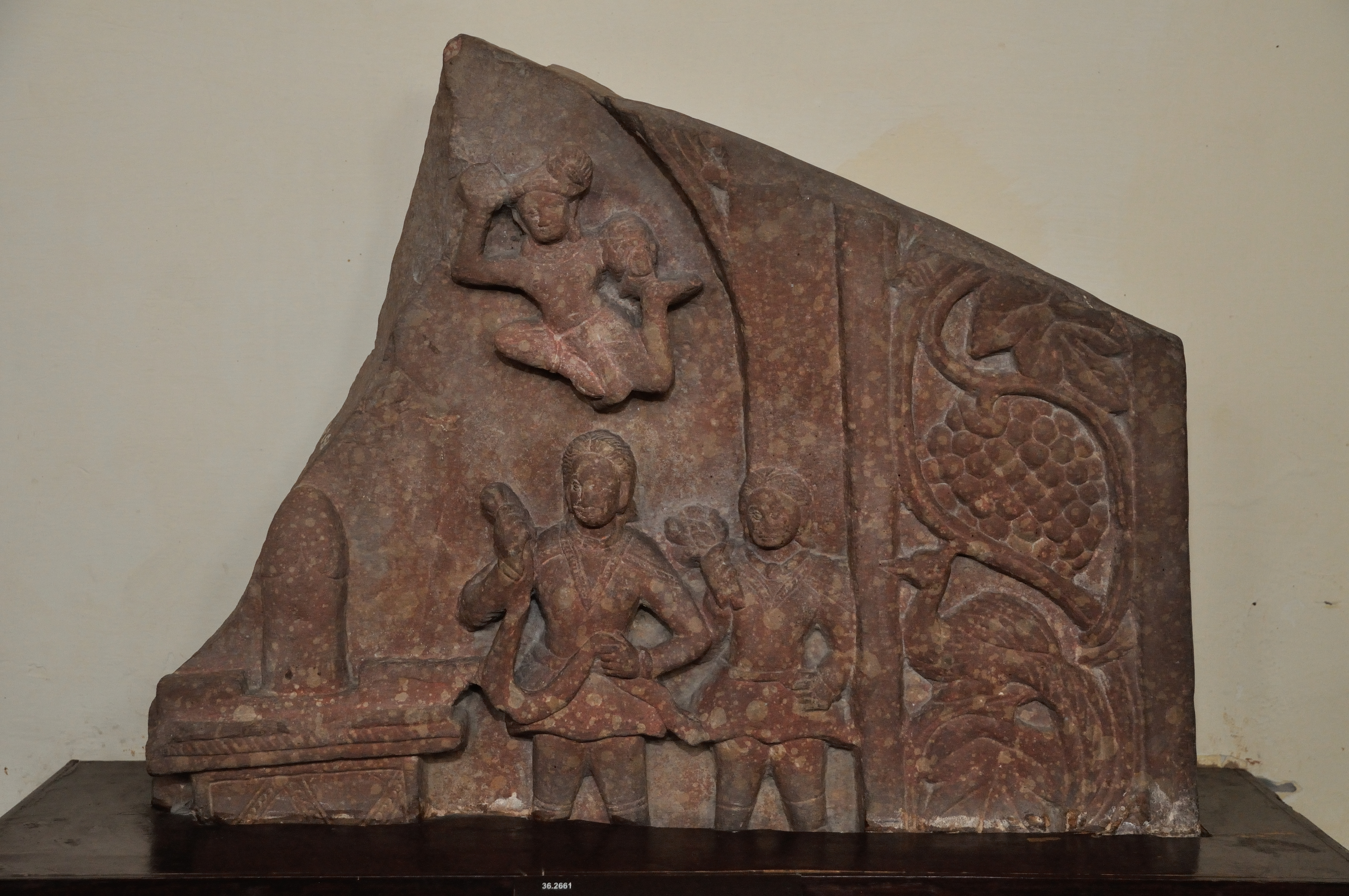
Shiva Linga worshipped by Kushan devotees, circa 2nd century CE

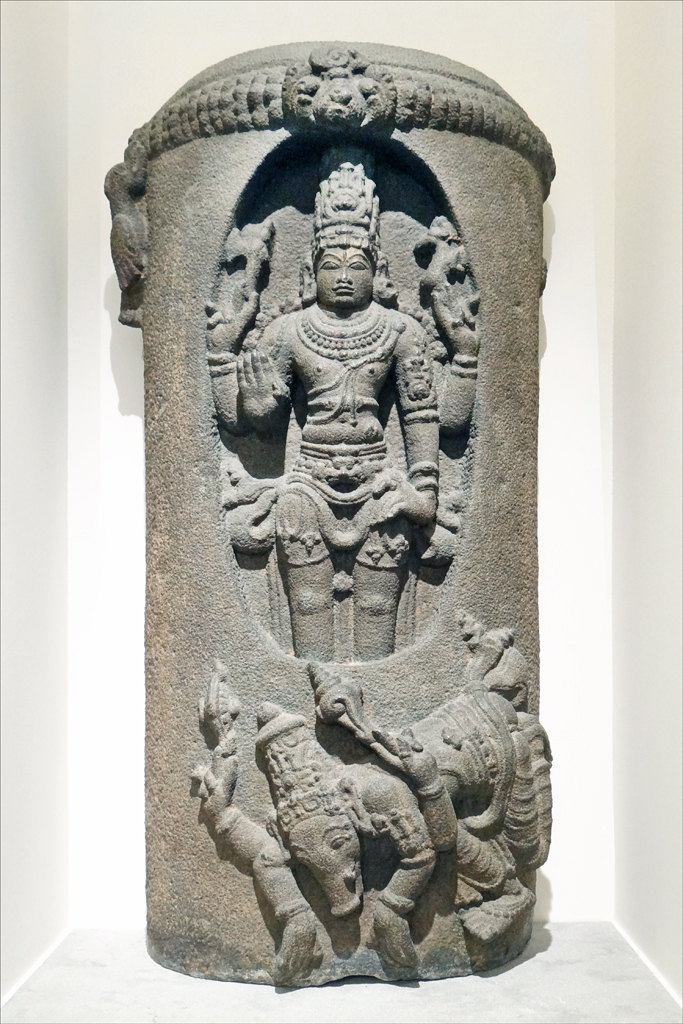
Lingodbhava (Chola period)

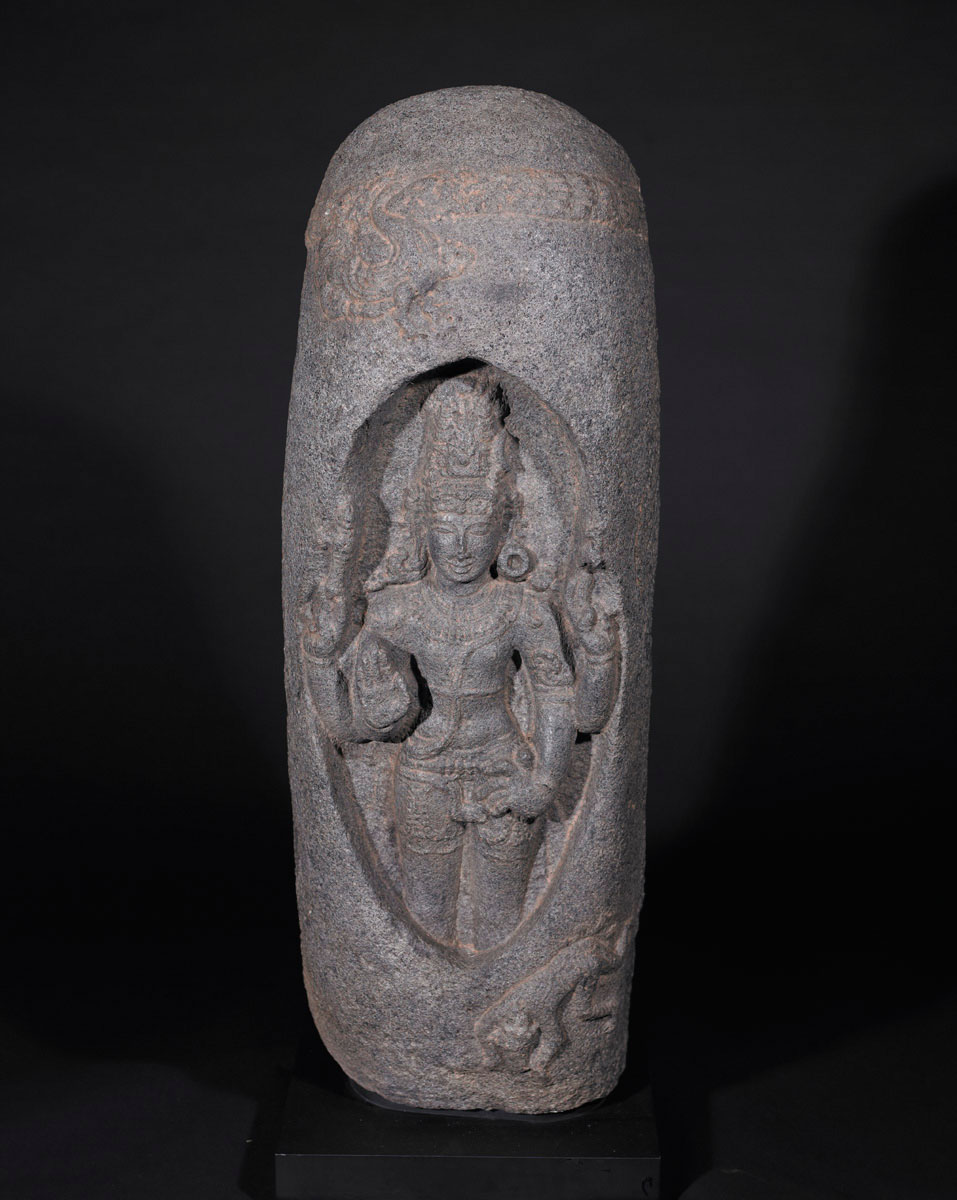
Lingodbhava (Chola period)

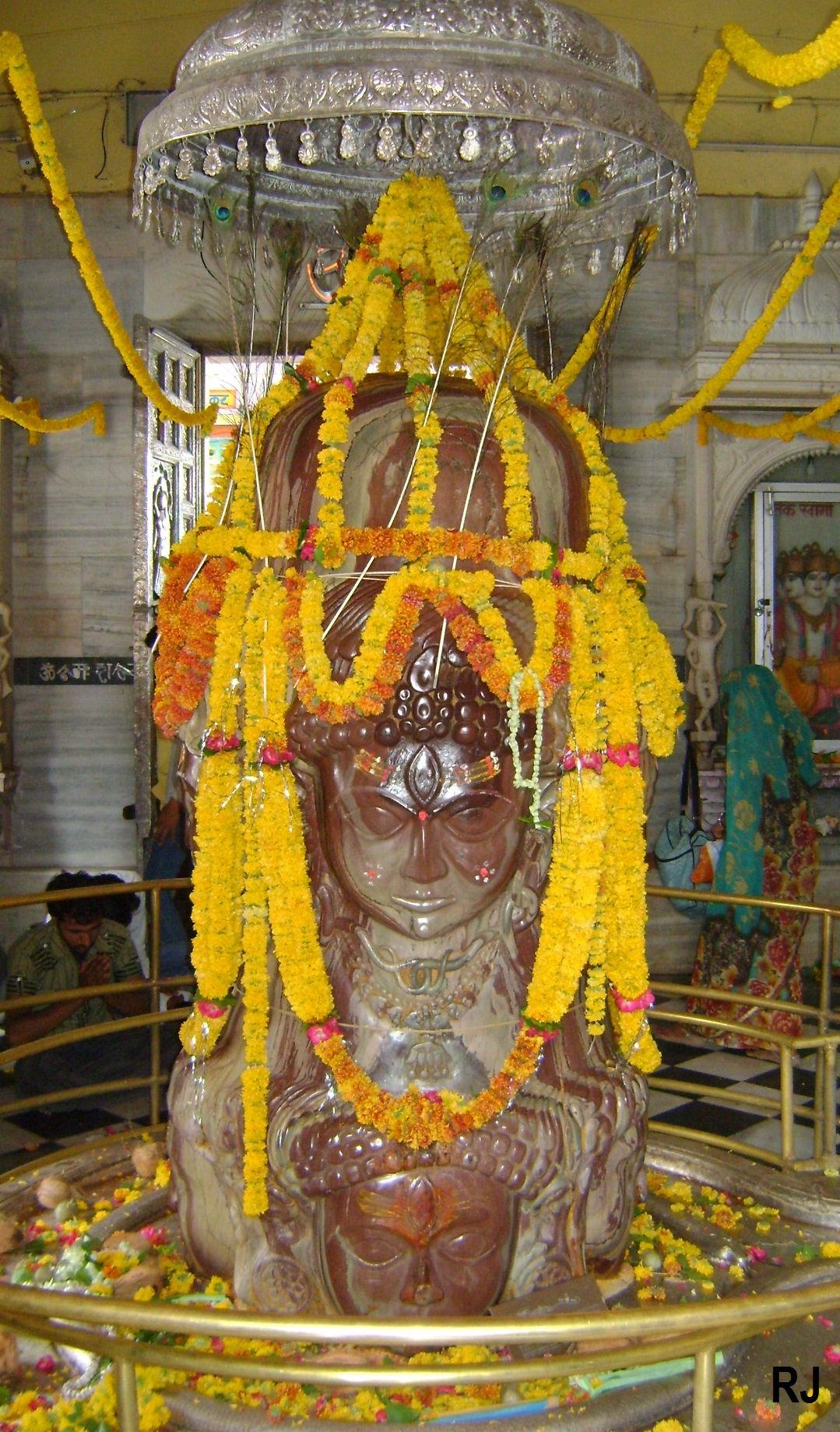
Eight-faced Shivlingam in Pashupatinath Temple at Mandsaur, Madhya Pradesh

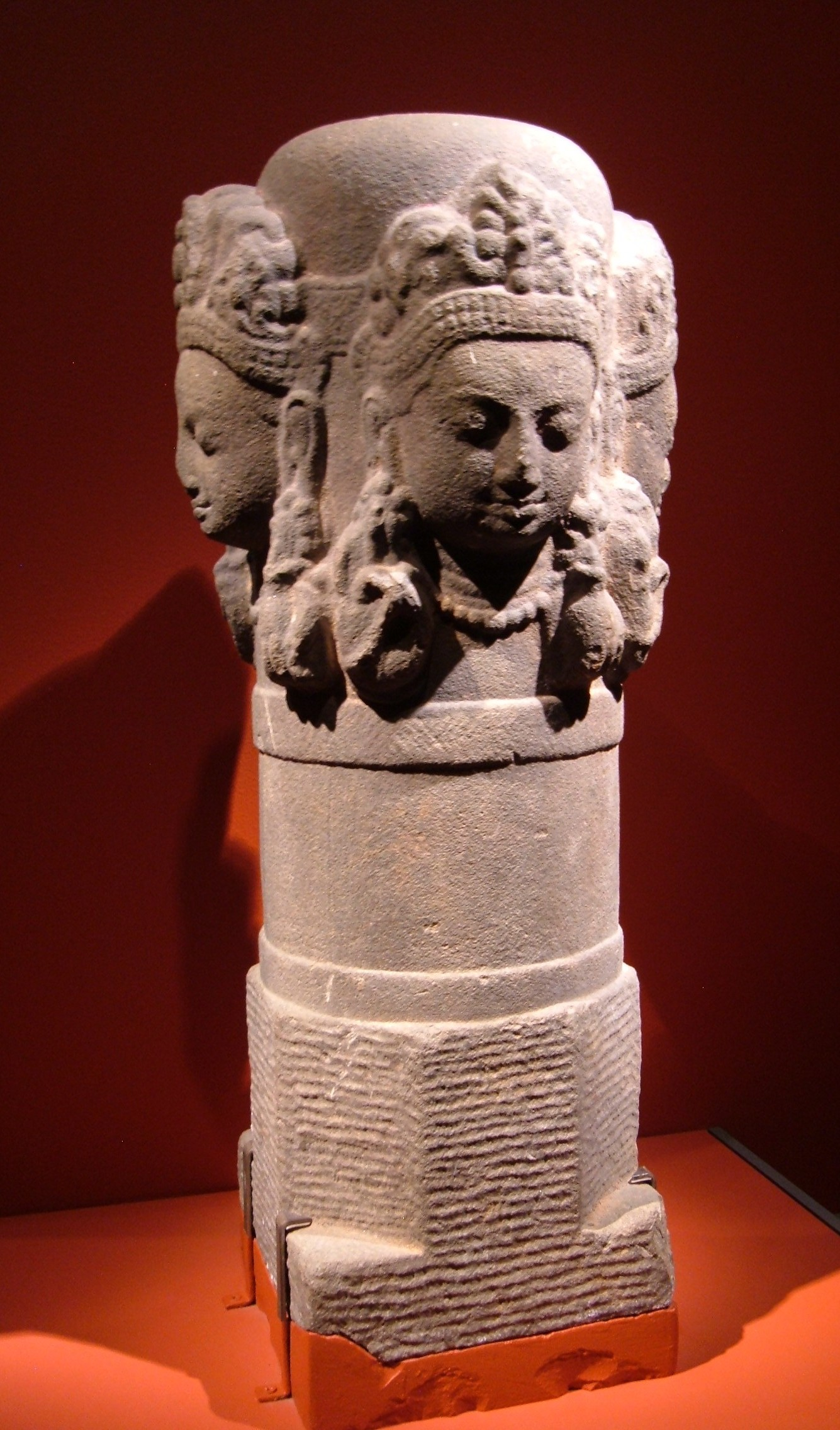
A 10th-century four-face Mukhalinga, Nepal

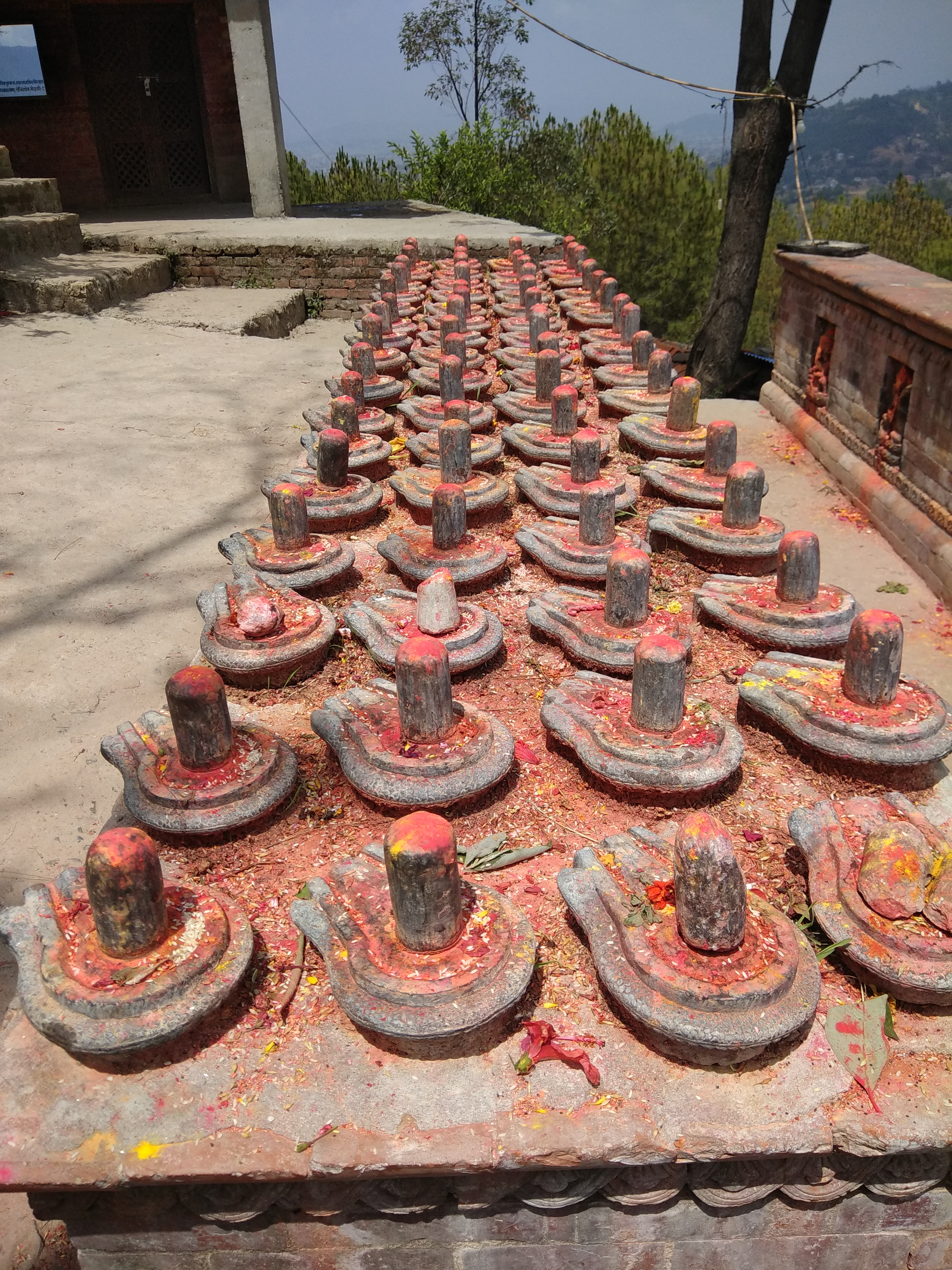
64 lingams (Nepal)

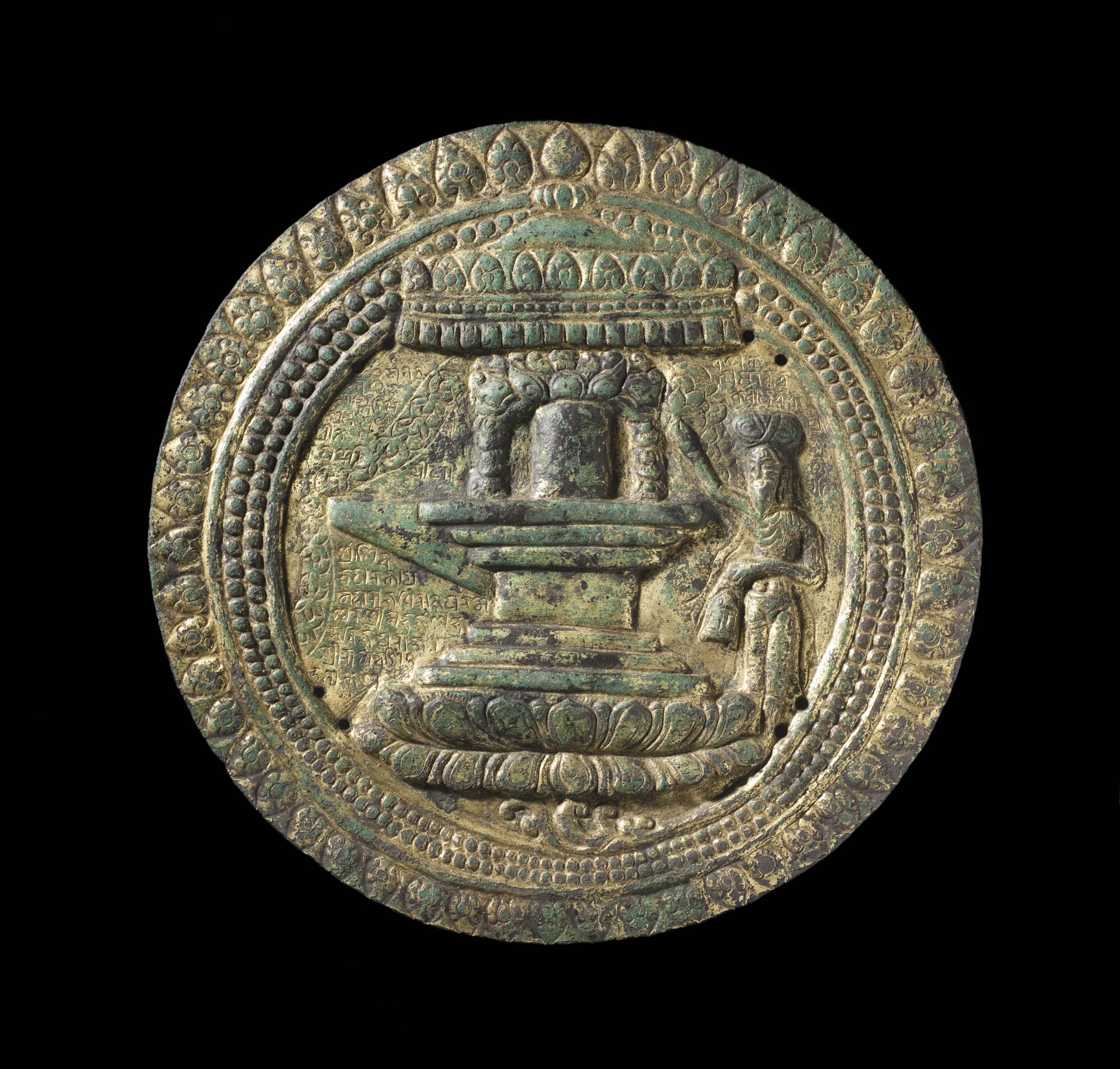
An 11th century CE linga-yoni plaque with a worshipper (Nepal)

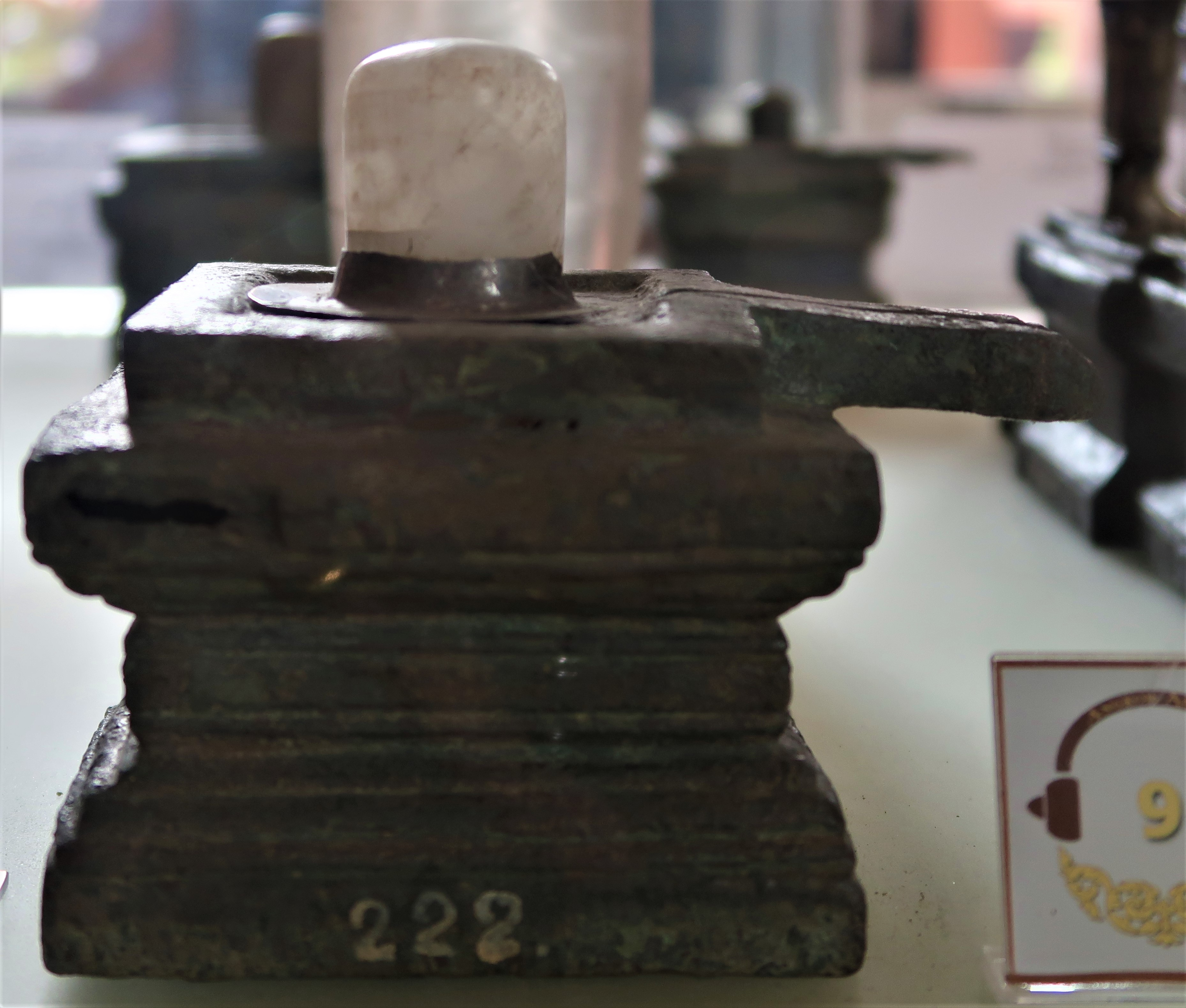
Lingam from Angkor period, Battambang Province (Cambodia)

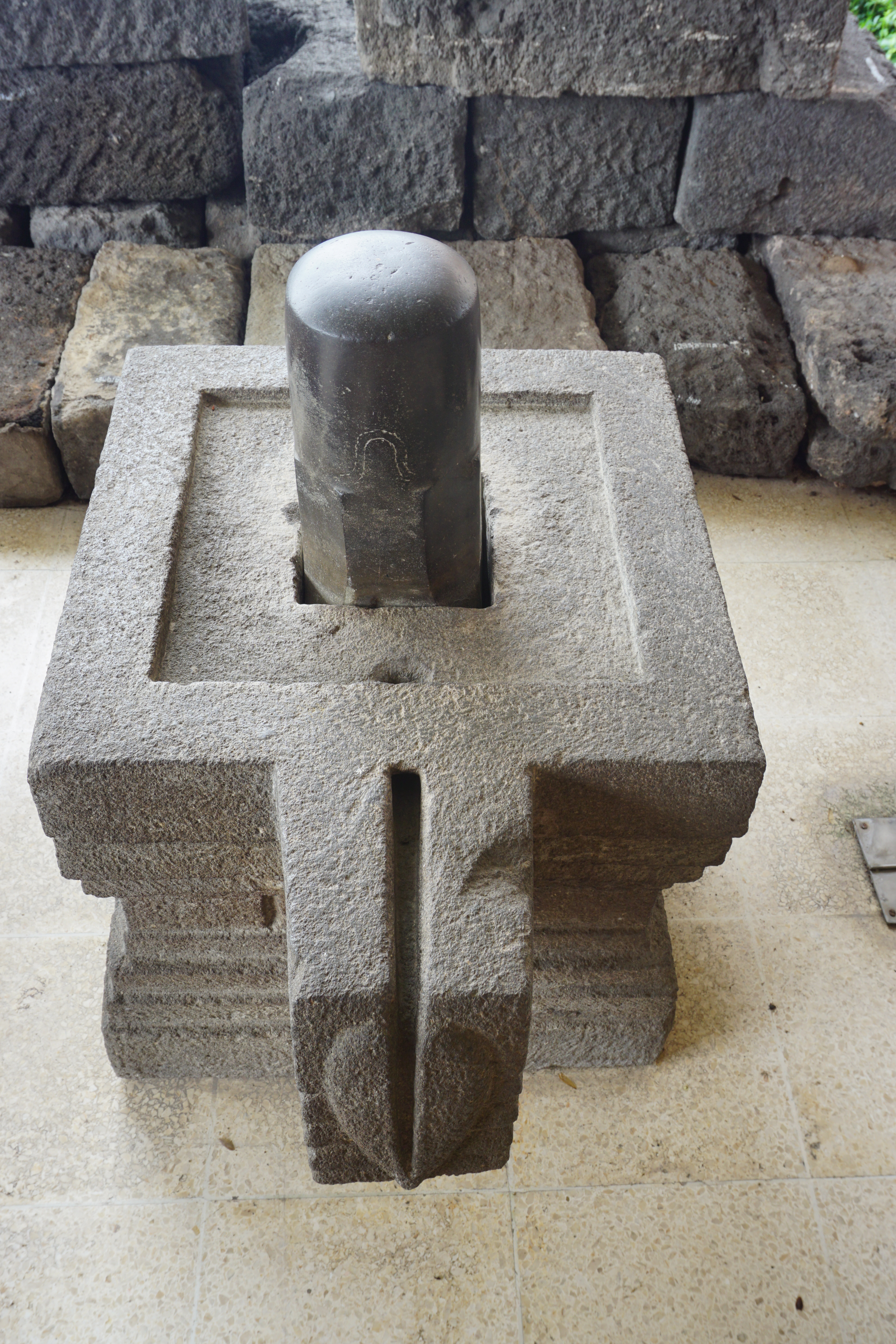
Linga-yoni, Java (Indonesia)

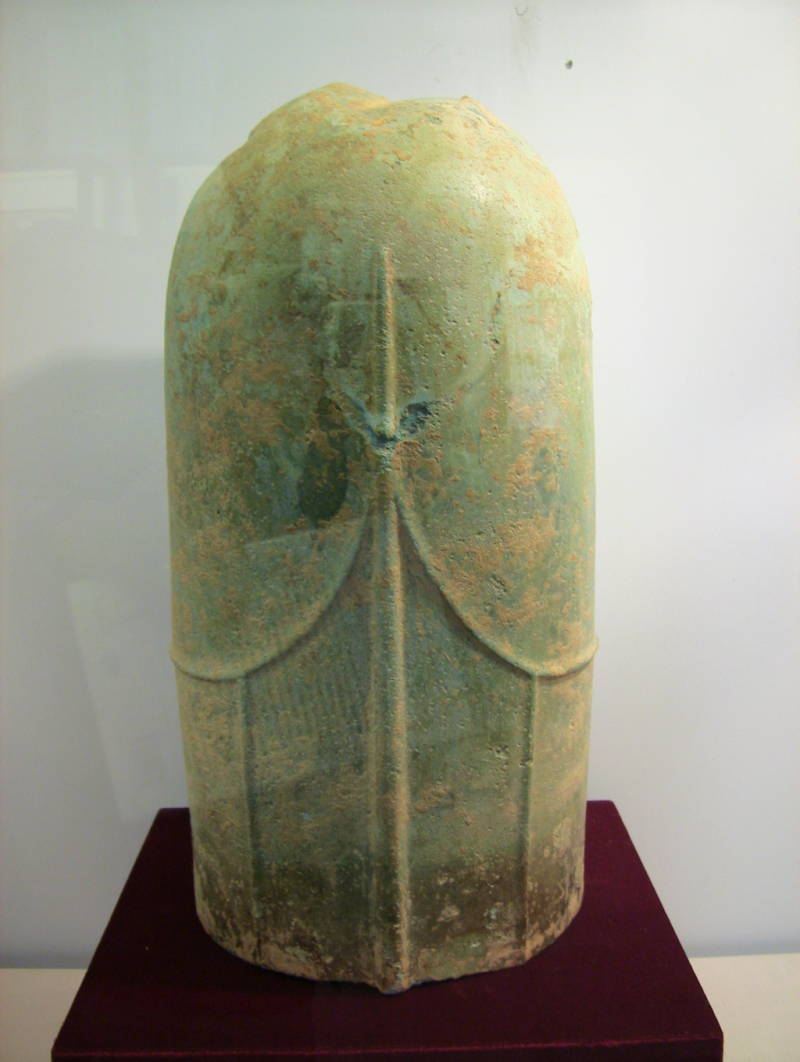
Copper lingam at the Cát Tiên sanctuary, Vietnam

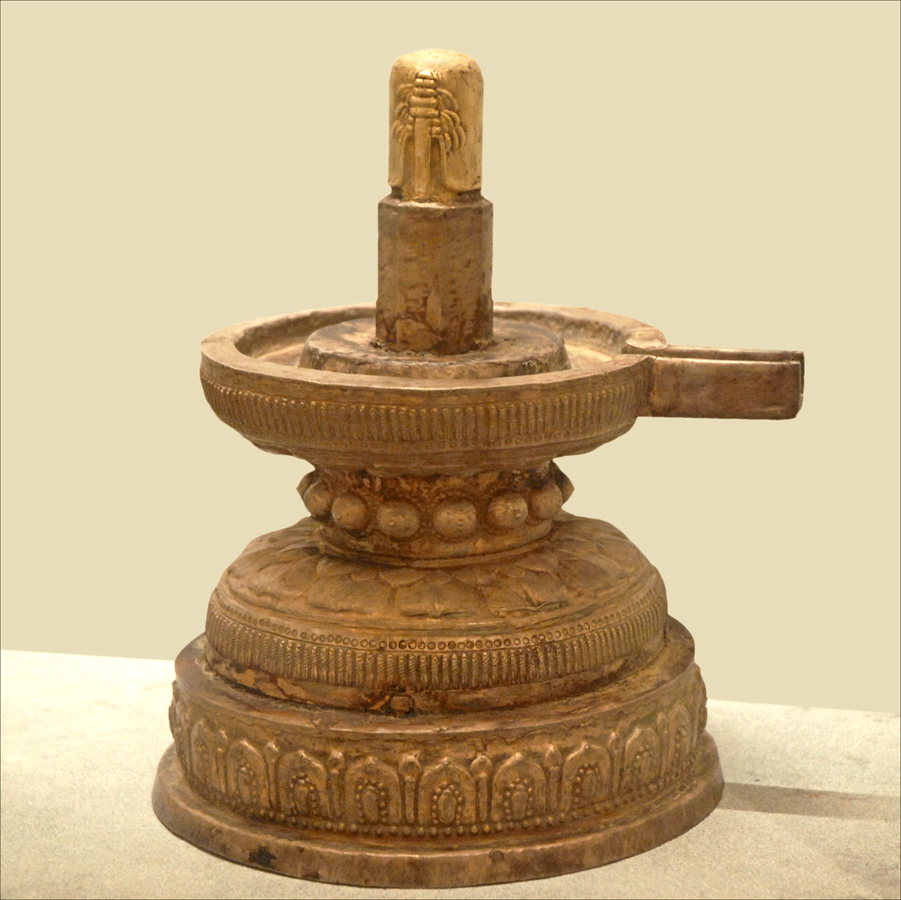
A jatalinga with yoni (Champa, Vietnam)

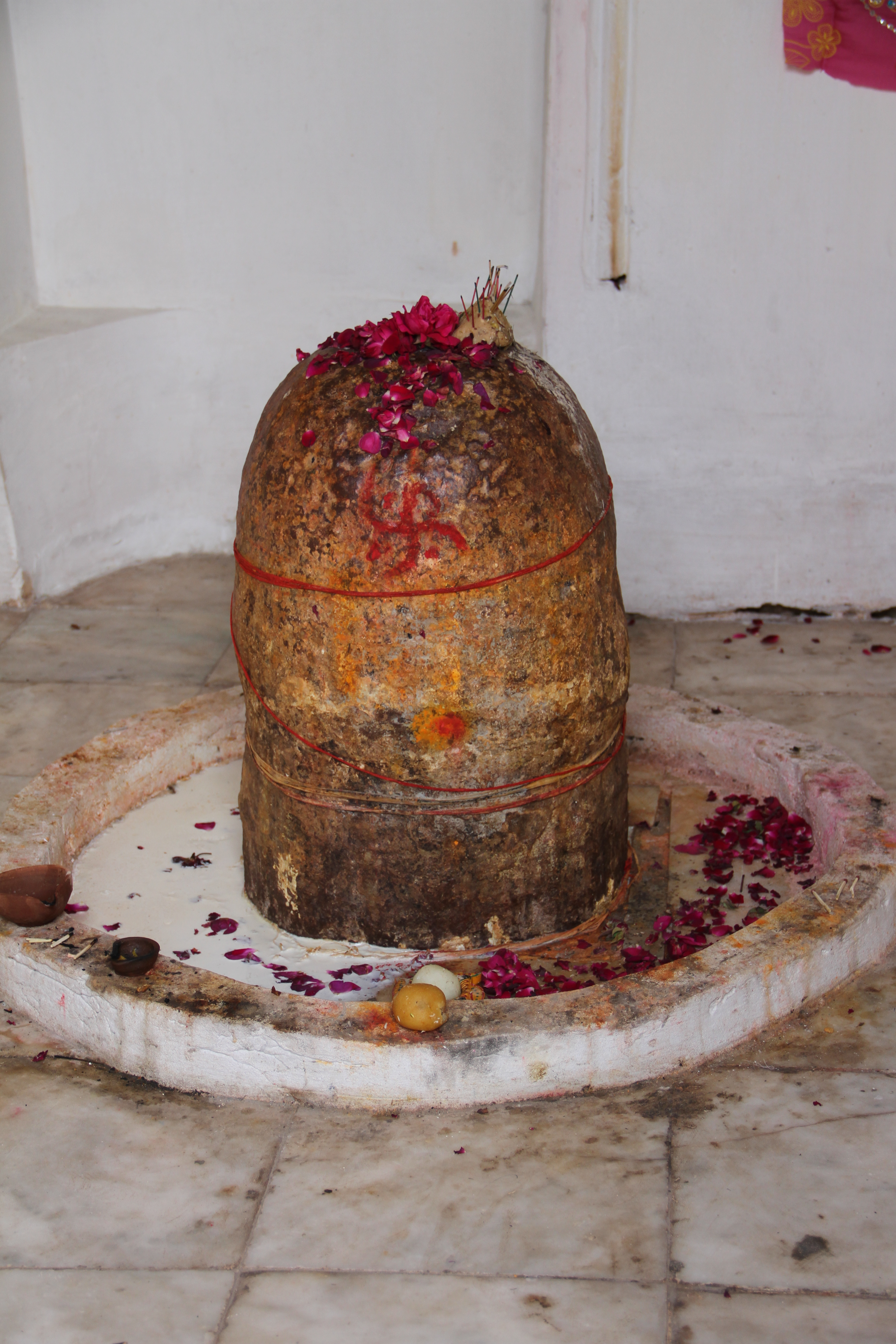
A lingam at the Katas Raj Temples in north Pakistan

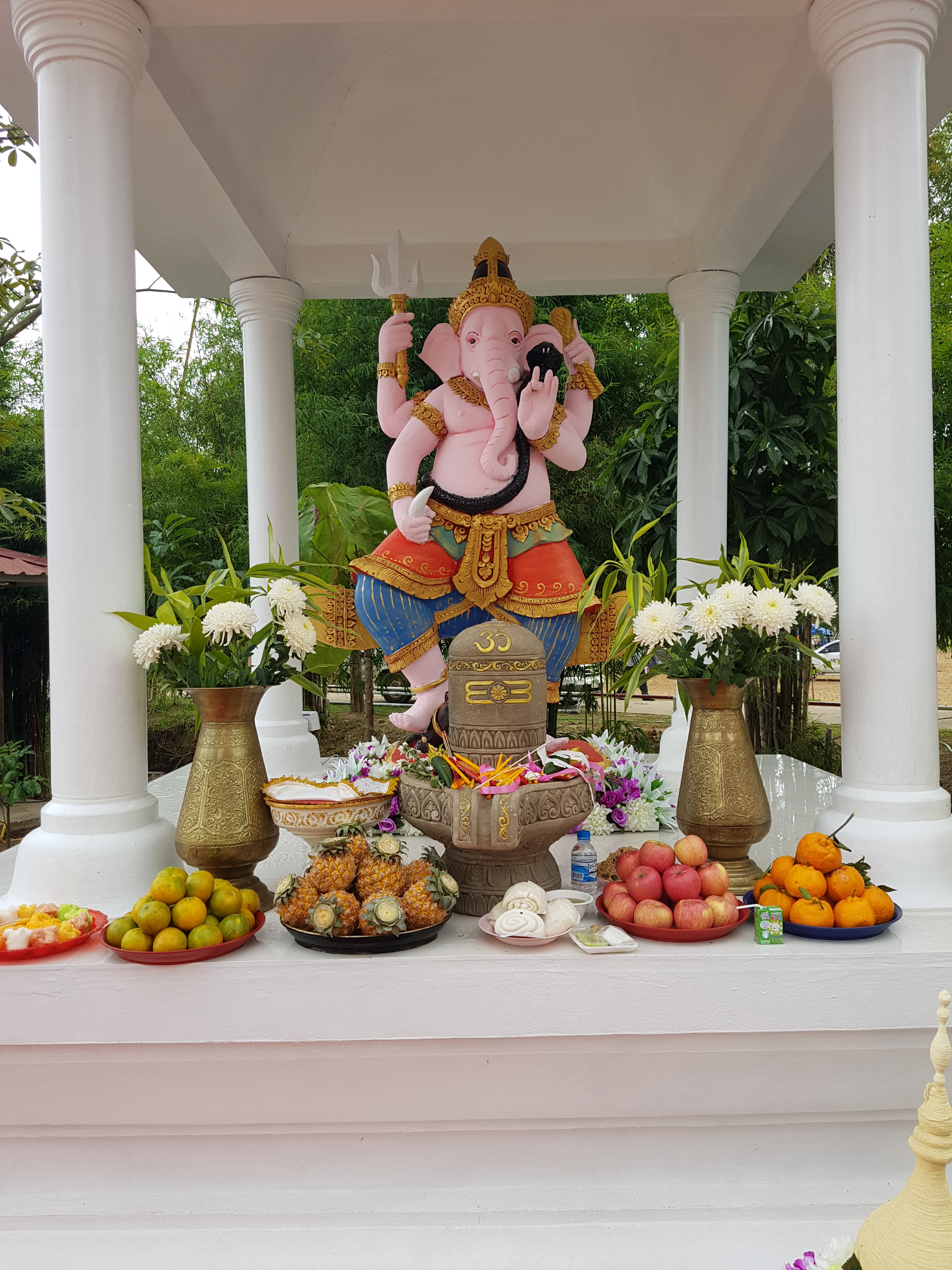
Ganesha and Shiva Linga, Chiang Rai, Thailand

== See also ==
- Banalinga
- Hindu iconography
- Indiana Jones and the Temple of Doom - a Lingam stone plays a central part in the film's plot
- Jyotirlinga
- Lingayatism
- Mukhalinga
- Gudimallam Lingam
- Pancharamas
- Shaligram
- Spatika Lingam
- Lingashtaka
- Sahasralingam Shivalinga, Kaithwalia
