= Sahasralingam Shivalinga, Kaithwalia =

Grand Shivalinga in Bihar, India

Sahasralingam Shivalinga
- सहस्त्रलिंगम शिवलिंग
- Type: Shivalinga
- Classification: Hinduism
- Region: Mithila
- Founder: Acharya Kishor Kunal
- Origin: 17 January 2026; Kaithwalia
- World tallest Shivalinga

Sahasralingam Shivalinga (Maithili: सहस्त्रलिंगम शिवलिंग) in Kaithwalia is a grand Shivalinga established at the premises of the Virat Ramayana Mandir in the Mithila region of India. It is located at Janaki Nagar village in Kaithwalia of the East Champaran district in the state of Bihar in India. It is the tallest Shivalinga in the world. Its height is 33 feet. It was established on 17 January 2026 in the presence of the chief minister Nitish Kumar of the state. The location is situated near the under-construction Ram Janaki Path highway passing through the East Champaran district. The highway connects to legendary cities Ayodhya in Uttar Pradesh and Janakpur in the Mithila region.

== Description ==
On the surface of the grand Sahasralingam, 1008 smaller Shivalingas have also been carved. The weight of the grand Shivalinga is about 210 metric tonnes. It is made from a colossal black-granite monolith.

The grand Shivalinga is divided into three parts. They are Brahma, Vishnu and Mahesh. The first part of the Shivalinga represents Lord Brahma, the middle part represents Lord Vishnu, and the top part represents Lord Shiva.

== History ==
The idea of building such a grand Shivalinga was initiated 10 years ago by Acharya Kishor Kunal of the Mahavir Mandir Trust. It was built by the Bihar Religious Trust Board, whose chairman at the time was Ashok Kunal.

The grand Shivalinga was constructed at Pattikadu village near Mahabalipuram town of the Chengalpattu district in the state of Tamil Nadu in India. It was constructed in the supervision of the sculptor Hemlata Devi and her son Vinayak Baikat Raman by a team of craftsmen. The construction of the Shivalinga was completed in November month of the year 2025. After that it was loaded on a heavy lorry to send at the Virat Ramayana Mandir in Bihar. The heavy lorry was departed on 12 November 2025 from the Mahabalipuram town in Tamil Nadu to Bihar. It took 46 days to reach at the location of the temple in Bihar.

The Sahasralingam Shivalinga was installed and inaugurated on the occasion of Narak Nivaran Chaturdashi on 17 January 2026. On the occasion of the installation of the Shivalinga, a grand religious ceremony was organised at the campus of the temple. The religious ceremony was conducted according to the Vedic rituals and practices in Hinduism. The MP Shambhavi Chaudhary from Samastipur and her husband Sayan Kunal attended the religious ceremony as Yajman.
