= Bhumara Temple =

5th or 6th-century Gupta era Hindu stone temple

Bhumara Temple Bharkuleswar Temple
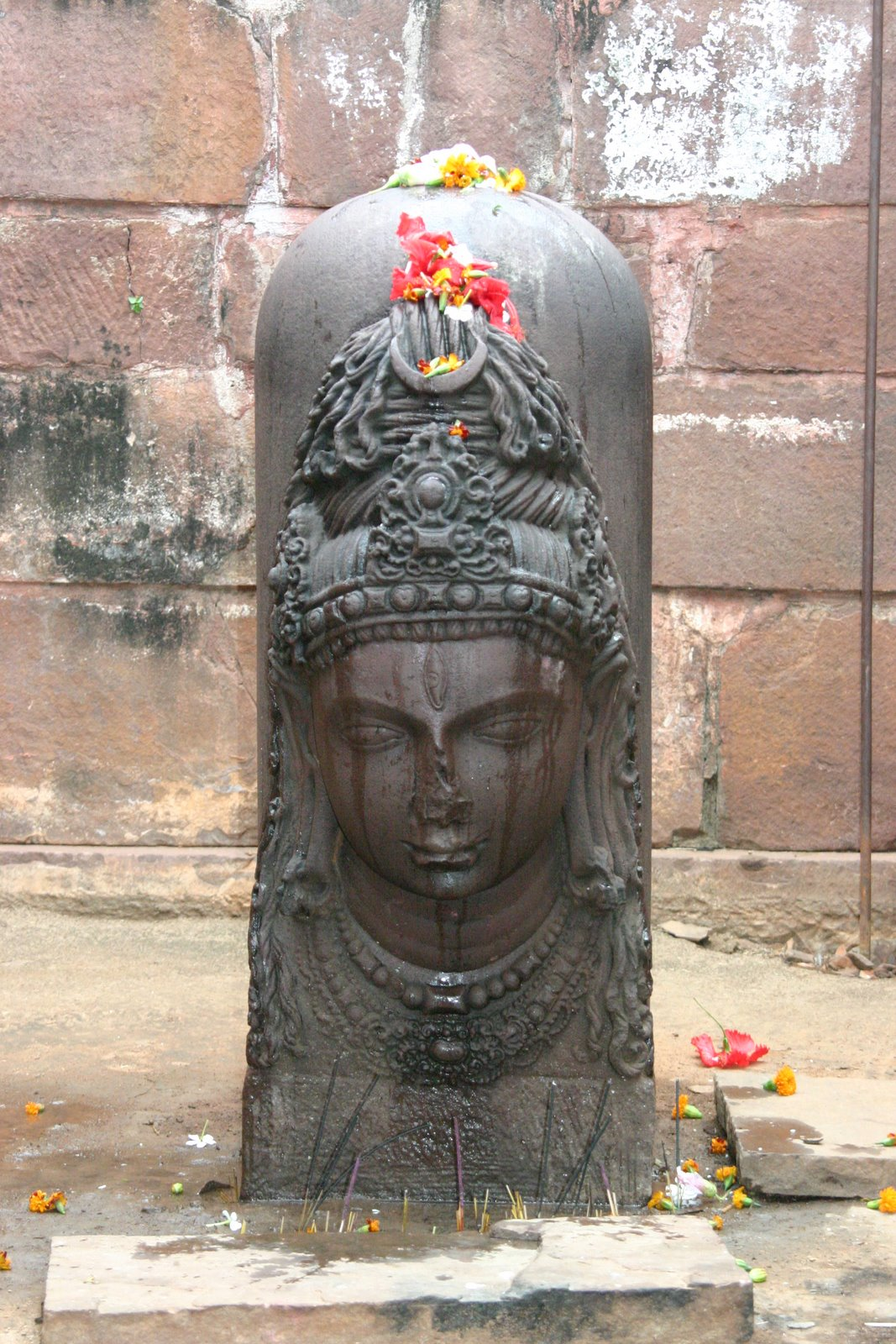
- 5th or 6th century Shiva stone temple

- Location within India Location within Madhya Pradesh

Religion
- Affiliation: Hinduism
- District: Satna
- Deity: Shiva, Kartikeya, Ganesha, Surya, Brahma, Kama, Durga, others

Location
- Location: Bhumra, Nagod
- State: Madhya Pradesh
- Country: India
- Interactive map of Bhumara Temple; Bharkuleswar Temple
- Coordinates: 24°25′42.1″N 80°38′29.6″E

Architecture
- Style: Nagara
- Completed: 5th or 6th century

Bhumara Temple, sometimes called Bhumra, Bhubhara or Bharkuleswar, is a 5th or 6th-century Gupta era Hindu stone temple site dedicated to Shiva near Satna, in the Indian state Madhya Pradesh. The temple has a square plan with a sanctum and Mandapa. While much of it is in ruins, enough of the temple structure and works of art have survived for scholarly studies. The temple is notable as one of the early examples of an architecture that included an enclosed concentric pradakshina-patha (circumambulation path). Like other early Gupta era Hindu temples, it includes a decorated entrance to the sanctum flanked by Ganga and Yamuna goddesses, and intricately carved sculptures.

The temple's Ekamukha Linga, a mukhalinga or faced lingam, with a detailed head of Shiva, is a much studied example of Gupta art. The temple reliefs include those for Mahishasura-mardini (Durga), Ganesha, Brahma, Vishnu, Yama, Kubera, Kartikeya, Surya, Kama and others.

A 5th-century relief sculpture at the Bhumara temple is significant in being one of the earliest known representations in sculpture of Ganesha.

Many of the ruined parts of the Bhumara temple have been moved to museums, especially the Kolkata Museum and the Allahabad Museum. The much studied Bhumara image of Ganesha with Sakti sitting in his lap was acquired by the Boston Museum of Fine Arts in 1920s and is now there.

== Location ==
The village and temple site of Bhumara rest on a largely shrubby hill plateau about 12 miles (19 km) northwest-west of the town of Unchehra, near the hills of Khamha and Mohnna. It is about 40 kilometres (25 mi) southwest of the city of Satna, about 35 kilometres (22 mi) south of Nagod and about 110 kilometres (68 mi) NNE of Katni, the closest local train stations. The temple site is at an altitude of 1,500 feet, midst forests.

== History ==
The archaeologist Alexander Cunningham visited the Bhumara site to confirm local reports of Thari pathar (standing stone) during his 1873-1874 tour of the Central Indian region. He found the stone and the important Bhumra inscription which he published, but he missed the temple that was then mostly covered by forest of shrubs and mango, haritaki and amalaka trees. John Faithfull Fleet translated the inscription in 1888, and it mentioned two kings named Hastin and Sarvanatha. The pillar inscription also described the boundary between their kingdoms and gave an inscription date per ancient Indian calendar that equals 484 CE.

Decades later, over the 1919-1920 period, the Archaeological Survey of India sent a sketch artist named Wartekar and a photographer named Joglekar together to revisit the site. They aimed to check out the local villager claims of many temple ruins on the plateau and the northern face of the hills. The dense forest limited the extent of their search, but they found the Bhumara temple. They reported it to be small single cell structure with a slab roof near an unusual soil mound, and that the temple's door was "magnificently carved".

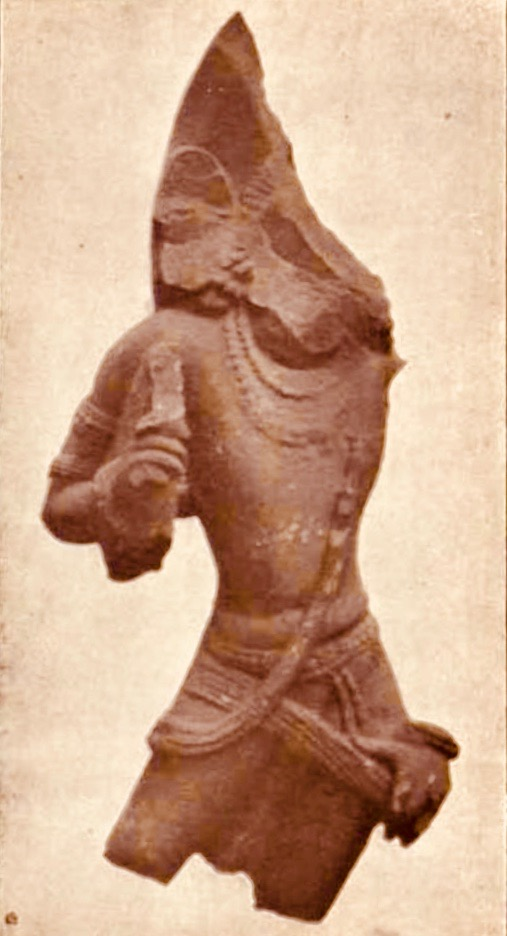
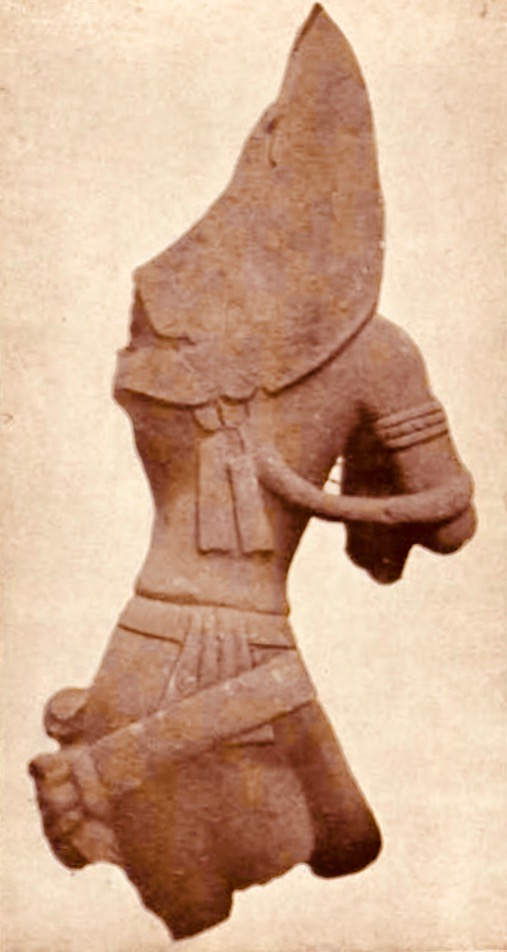
Damaged statues found in Bhumara ruins.

The first report indicated that stones were sticking out of the temple that suggested the temple was originally much bigger. They also reported that broken pillars and ruins surrounded it. The Archaeological Survey of India then sent a larger team, excavated the mound and discovered numerous sculptures. Among these were a chaitya-window shaped panel with a circular medallion and the sculpture of Ganesha, jumbled remains of mandapa and temple parts. The site was next cleaned up, cleared of the forest growth and the first repairs to the temple was undertaken in early 1920s. During this cleaning, clearing and repairs, states Banerjee, many more "sculptures and their fragments, pillar fragments, lintels, jambs with a number of images" were found.

== Dating ==
The Bhumara Shiva temple has been variously dated. Early estimates in the 1920s placed it either in the second half of the 5th-century or the early 6th-century. With additional analysis of inscriptions and a comparative study of its design with other Gupta era temples, the temple is generally dated to late fifth century. According to Heather Elgood, it is a 5th-century temple. Frederick Asher dates it to about 475 CE. Michael Meister and others date it to late 5th-century. George Michell states that the precise dating of the Bhumara Shiva temple, Nachna Parvati temple and Deogarh Vishnu temple is uncertain, but they existed by the 6th-century.

== Description ==
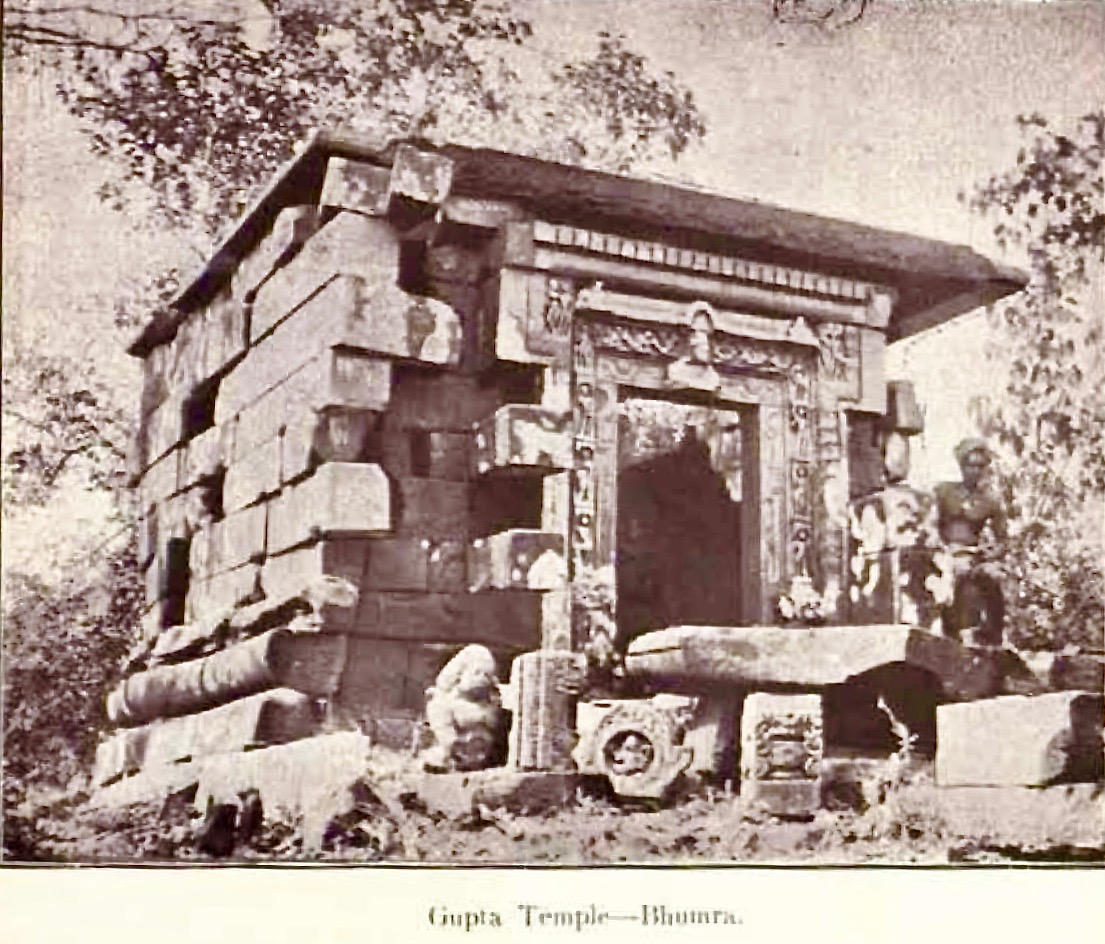
Bhumara temple sanctum midst its ruins, 1919 photo. The temple has been partially restored.

The Shiva temple of Bhumara stands on an approximately 1.4 metres (4 ft 7 in) high platform (Jagati), which is comparable in dimensions to the two temples of Nachna. Stairs lead to the platform, and the steps are 11.25 feet (3.43 m) long and 8.43 feet (2.57 m) in breadth. On top of the platform are two concentric chambers with a square plan. The smaller inner square is a windowless garbhagriha with a 15.17 feet (4.62 m) side. The outer square has a 35 feet (11 m) side. The space between the inner sanctum chamber and the outer one served as an enclosed space for circumambulation. It is unclear whether the walls of the outer square had any trellis windows like the Nachna temple, as the excavations did not yield the complete temple. The steps leading to the sanctum are flanked by two smaller platforms about 8.17 feet (2.49 m) by 5.67 feet (1.73 m), each with a small shrine. The collected ruins suggest that the temple likely had three entrances.

A pillared open porch (mandapa) is set before it, so the initial impression of the temple appears roughly similar to ones in Tigawa and Sanchi. The mandapa was 29.83 feet (9.09 m) by 13 feet (4.0 m). The ruined structure that has been viewable since early 20th-century is the inner sanctum with its intricate carvings, the platform, the stairs and remnant walls. The roof of the temple was simple and consisted of huge flat slabs.

=== Reliefs and decoration ===
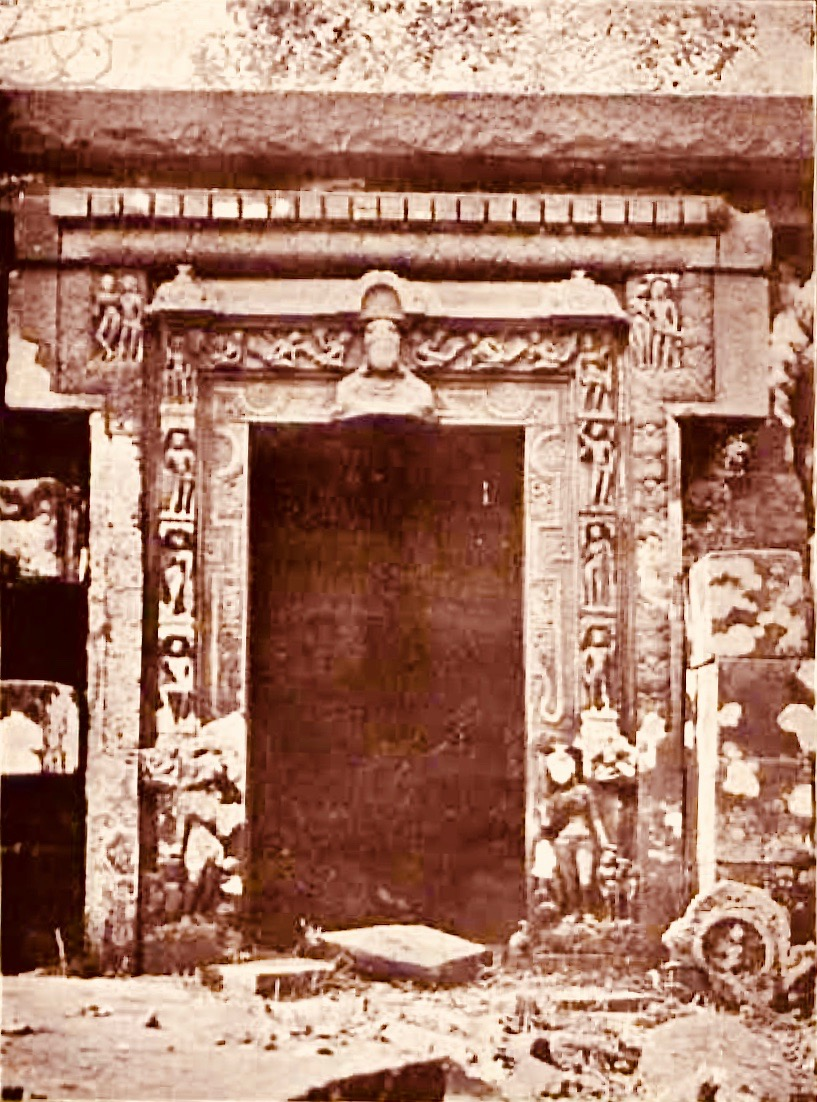
The carved sanctum door, 1919 photograph.

The three outer walls of the sanctum lack any decoration. They are smooth red sandstone. The side with an entrance into the sanctum is intricately carved and decorated. The sanctum door consists of a carved lintel, two carved jambs and a sill. To the right is goddess Ganga standing on her vahana - the makara (crocodile-like mythical creature), on the left is Yamuna goddess standing on her vahana - a tortoise. They have attendants standing with them, but their images are too mutilated. Above these goddesses are three parallel bands of carvings. The outermost band shows blooming lotus one giving rise to the other above it. The middle band on both sides each consists of four niches with human figures. The inner band converges towards the center of the lintel where Shiva is carved. The sculpture has been defaced, but its forehead remains intact where the third eye survives. Additionally, his ear rings, necklace and pearl jewelry is still discernible.

=== Shiva Lingam ===
Among the most important artefacts of Bhumara is a Shiva-lingam with a bust relief of the dy which occupies almost the entire height of the lingam. Lingas with faces are called a mukhalinga, those with one face are called ekamukha linga. The Indian archaeologists visiting Bhumara temple around 1920 discovered a somewhat damaged ekamukha linga embedded within a stone pavement in the sanctum. It is 6.08 feet (1.85 m) high set on rough square block at the bottom with 3.08 feet (0.94 m) side. The linga is a smooth cylinder with Shiva's face carved over the cylindrical length on one side. This face matches the one on the lintel top at the sanctum doorway.

The Bhumara Shiva linga wears a jeweled crown, necklace and pearl ornaments. He is shown with matted hair, some locks on his shoulders. His hair is tied up into a bun at top, where there is a thin crescent moon. His forehead has a third eye. His nose is broken, likely intentionally damaged. According to Banerjee, the Shiva face on the lingam is well proportioned but it is not as "beautiful as the face on sanctum door lintel" or the ancient ekamukha linga found in Khoh, Madhya Pradesh.

=== Bhumara ruins ===
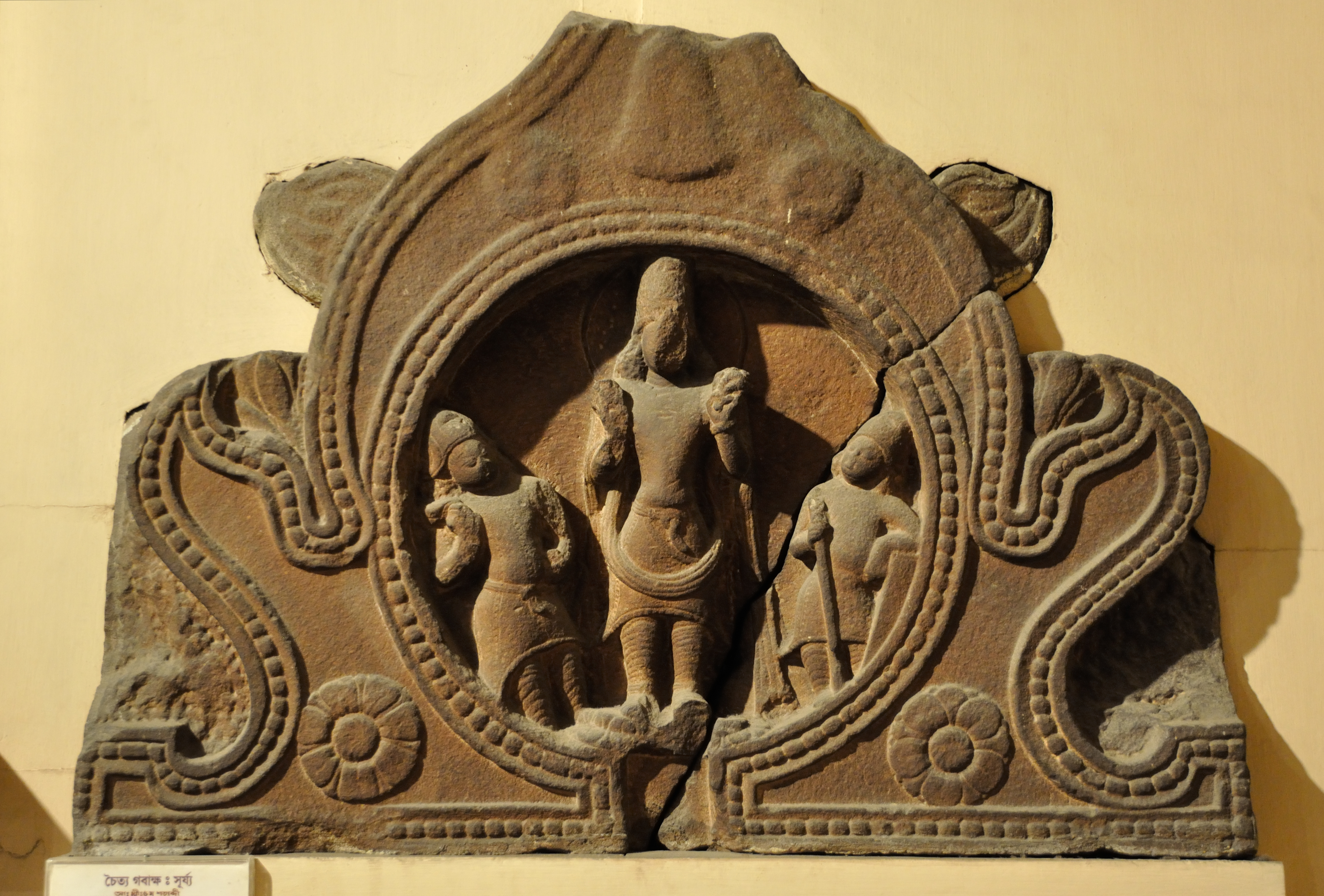
A gavaksha with Vedic deity Surya shown inside, recovered from Bhumara ruins.

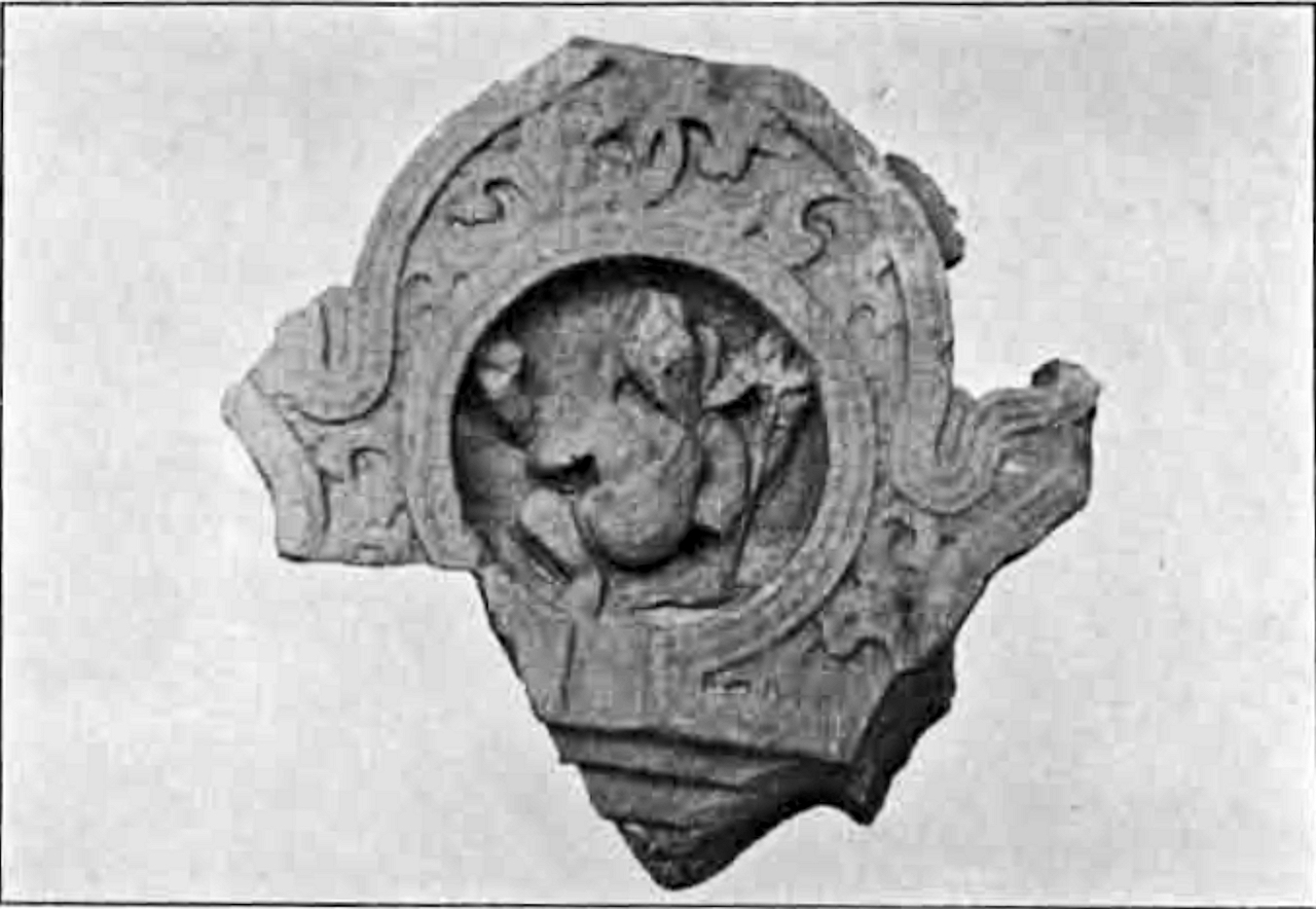
Ganesha, recovered from Bhumara Temple, 5th-6th century CE.

The Bhumara excavations have yielded numerous sculpture, broken pieces of walls and statues, as well as ruined parts of the mandapas. The recovered pieces included parts of another intricately carved doorway, larger than the one on the sanctum. It had river goddesses Yamuna (reasonably preserved) and Ganga (broken), but to their immediate vicinity the stone was smooth, unlike the sanctum doorway. The recovered portions of this broken doorway show that it also had three bands of carvings above the head of the goddess. This doorway likely was a part of the mandapa. Portions of broken lintels found lying around the site show figures of erotes, in the same style as one finds in the ancient Khoh temples. The recovered fragments in the ruins when put together show that they are incomplete and parts have been lost.

Other ruins found at the site included pilaster and pillar parts. These were square, hexagonal, octagonal or dodecagonal in cross section. The largest of these had square bases. Some were smooth, some carved. Pieces recovered show that the top and bottom portions had carvings. Many show foliage and designs that are now called the arabesque style. Lotus motifs are common. Some pillar shafts include huge kirtimukhas on each face. Some kirtimukhas are depicted with garlands hanging out of their mouths.

Extensive slab ruins were also found near the mandapa platform. These are carved with various motifs and figures. They show people in their daily lives, warriors, ganas (dwarfs) holding various items such as sword in one hand and lotus in the other, some people with clean shaven heads and others with elaborate hairdos. Musicians, dancers, seated groups of men or women, animals, flowers and other scenes are set in medallions. Recovered wall panels of the Bhumara Shiva temple show Vishnu's Narasimha avatar blowing a conch shell, Krishna and others. Other significant finds include those of Nataraja, Ganesha, single face Kartikeya, Surya, Durga in her Mahishasura-mardini form, Brahma, Indra, Yama, Kubera, Kama and others.

=== Comparison with Nachna temple ===
The Bhumara temple is, except for some major differences, quite similar in its plan to the Nachna temple about 50 kilometres (31 mi) to the west of Bhumara. The differences are that Bhumara lacked the second storey found in the Nachna temple and it featured two small shrines near the steps of the main temple. The similarities include a square sanctum surrounded by an circumambulation path enclosed with a concentric masonry chamber. Both were built on a raised platform, had staired entrances, had a pillared mandapa in front. The size and enclosed area in the sanctum and the outer chamber were similar. The material of construction in both was red sandstone, neither used mortar and each relied on ashlar masonry.

== Significance ==
The Gupta temple of Bhumara is an important Gupta era Shaivism temple from ancient India. It is the earliest known temple that shows "Ganesha and Shakti" together, where the goddess Vinayaki sits in his lap and he holds a bowl of batasas or modakas (sweets) in his left hand. It also portrayed Ganesha in various forms, along with other Vedic and Puranic gods and goddesses of Hinduism. This has been a part of the evidence that sets a floruit of 5th-century to the importance of Ganesha in Hindu theology.

The Bhumara temple is notable for being an early illustration of Shaivism iconography and its inclusion of Vaishnavism and Shaktism themes. The Bhumara reliefs include an early Nataraja and Kartikeya seated on a peacock.

Taken together with other Gupta era temples and artwork for Vaishnavism and Shaktism, the Bhumara temple attests to the sophistication of artisans by the 4th and 5th-century ancient India. More recent similar discoveries such as the temple ruins discovered with inscriptions dated to 448 CE at the Dinajpur site in ancient Bengal (now in Bangladesh) suggest that arts and temples were flourishing by the 5th-century.

== See also ==
- Eran
- Dashavatara Temple
- Nachna
- Tigawa

== Literature ==
- Prasanna Kumar Acharya (2010). An encyclopaedia of Hindu architecture. Oxford University Press (Republished by Motilal Banarsidass). ISBN 978-81-7536-534-6.
- Prasanna Kumar Acharya (1997). A Dictionary of Hindu Architecture: Treating of Sanskrit Architectural Terms with Illustrative Quotations. Oxford University Press (Reprinted in 1997 by Motilal Banarsidass). ISBN 978-81-7536-113-3.
- Vinayak Bharne; Krupali Krusche (2014). Rediscovering the Hindu Temple: The Sacred Architecture and Urbanism of India. Cambridge Scholars Publishing. ISBN 978-1-4438-6734-4.
- Alice Boner (1990). Principles of Composition in Hindu Sculpture: Cave Temple Period. Motilal Banarsidass. ISBN 978-81-208-0705-1.
- Alice Boner; Sadāśiva Rath Śarmā (2005). Silpa Prakasa. Brill Academic (Reprinted by Motilal Banarsidass). ISBN 978-8120820524.
- A.K. Coomaraswamy; Michael W. Meister (1995). Essays in Architectural Theory. Indira Gandhi National Centre for the Arts. ISBN 978-0-19-563805-9.
- Dehejia, V. (1997). Indian Art. Phaidon: London. ISBN 0-7148-3496-3.
- Adam Hardy (1995). Indian Temple Architecture: Form and Transformation. Abhinav Publications. ISBN 978-81-7017-312-0.
- Adam Hardy (2007). The Temple Architecture of India. Wiley. ISBN 978-0470028278.
- Adam Hardy (2015). Theory and Practice of Temple Architecture in Medieval India: Bhoja's Samarāṅgaṇasūtradhāra and the Bhojpur Line Drawings. Indira Gandhi National Centre for the Arts. ISBN 978-93-81406-41-0.
- Harle, J.C., The Art and Architecture of the Indian Subcontinent, 2nd edn. 1994, Yale University Press Pelican History of Art, ISBN 0300062176
- Monica Juneja (2001). Architecture in Medieval India: Forms, Contexts, Histories. Orient Blackswan. ISBN 978-8178242286.
- Stella Kramrisch (1976). The Hindu Temple Volume 1. Motilal Banarsidass (Reprinted 1946 Princeton University Press). ISBN 978-81-208-0223-0.
- Stella Kramrisch (1979). The Hindu Temple Volume 2. Motilal Banarsidass (Reprinted 1946 Princeton University Press). ISBN 978-81-208-0224-7.
- Michael W. Meister; Madhusudan Dhaky (1986). Encyclopaedia of Indian temple architecture. American Institute of Indian Studies. ISBN 978-0-8122-7992-4.
- George Michell (1988), The Hindu Temple: An Introduction to Its Meaning and Forms, University of Chicago Press, ISBN 978-0-226-53230-1
- George Michell (2000). Hindu Art and Architecture. Thames & Hudson. ISBN 978-0-500-20337-8.
- T. A. Gopinatha Rao (1993). Elements of Hindu iconography. Motilal Banarsidass. ISBN 978-81-208-0878-2.
- Ajay J. Sinha (2000). Imagining Architects: Creativity in the Religious Monuments of India. University of Delaware Press. ISBN 978-0-87413-684-5.
- Burton Stein (1978). South Indian Temples. Vikas. ISBN 978-0706904499.
- Burton Stein (1989). The New Cambridge History of India: Vijayanagara. Cambridge University Press. ISBN 978-0-521-26693-2.
- Burton Stein; David Arnold (2010). A History of India. John Wiley & Sons. ISBN 978-1-4443-2351-1.
- Kapila Vatsyayan (1997). The Square and the Circle of the Indian Arts. Abhinav Publications. ISBN 978-81-7017-362-5.
- Banerji, R. D. (1998), The Temple of Siva at Bhumara, Memoirs of the Archaeological Survey of India No 16 (Orig year 1924), " This article incorporates text from this source, which is in the public domain."
- ASI (1920), Progress Report of the ASI Western Circle 1920, Archaeological Survey of India, " This article incorporates text from this source, which is in the public domain."
- Michael W. Meister u. a. (Eds.): Encyclopaedia of Indian Temple Architecture. North India - Foundations of North Indian Style Princeton University Press, Princeton, 1988, ISBN 0-691-04053-2, p 40ff.
