= Mukhalinga =

Lingam with one or more human faces in Hinduism

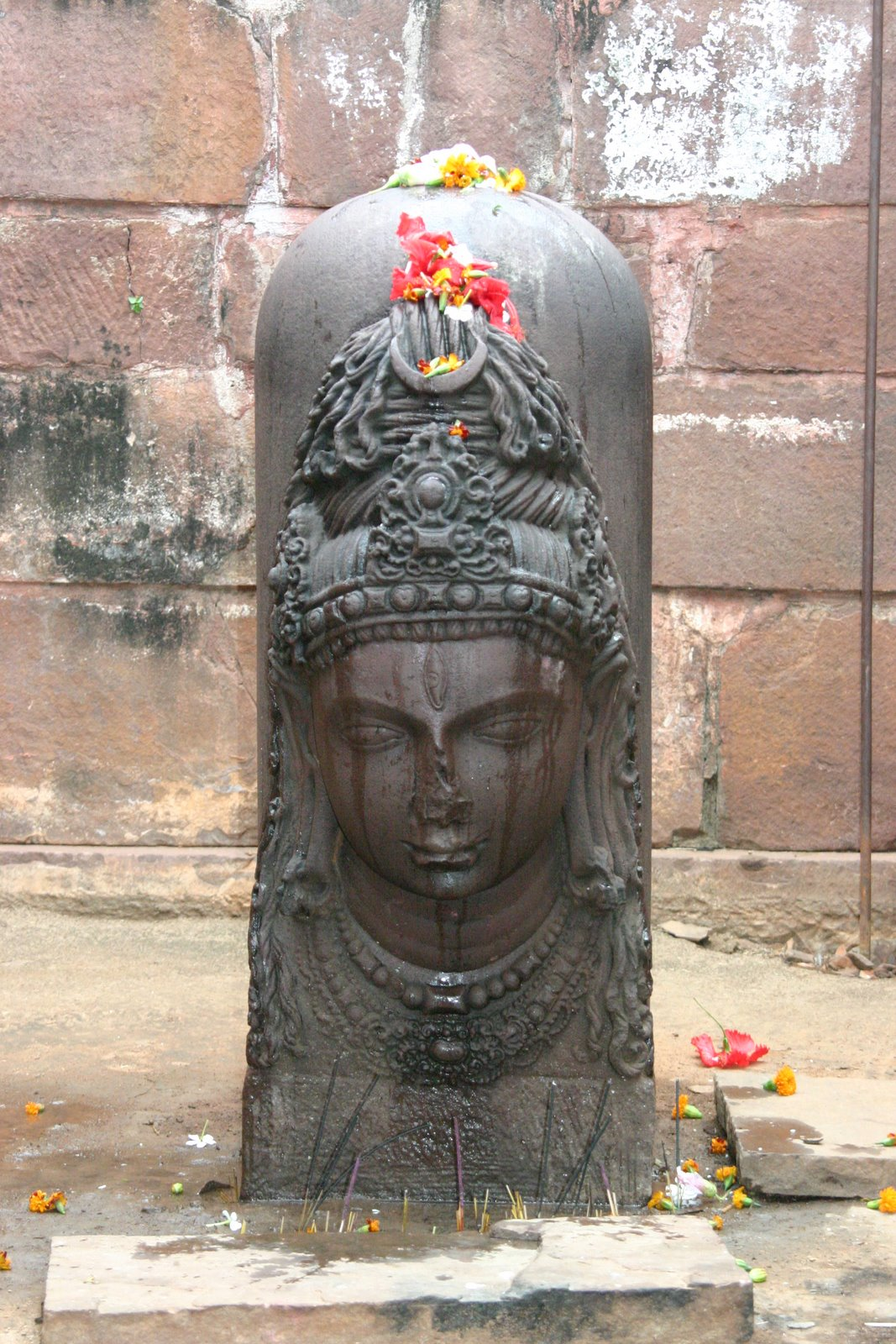
A Gupta era one-faced mukhalinga, Bhumara

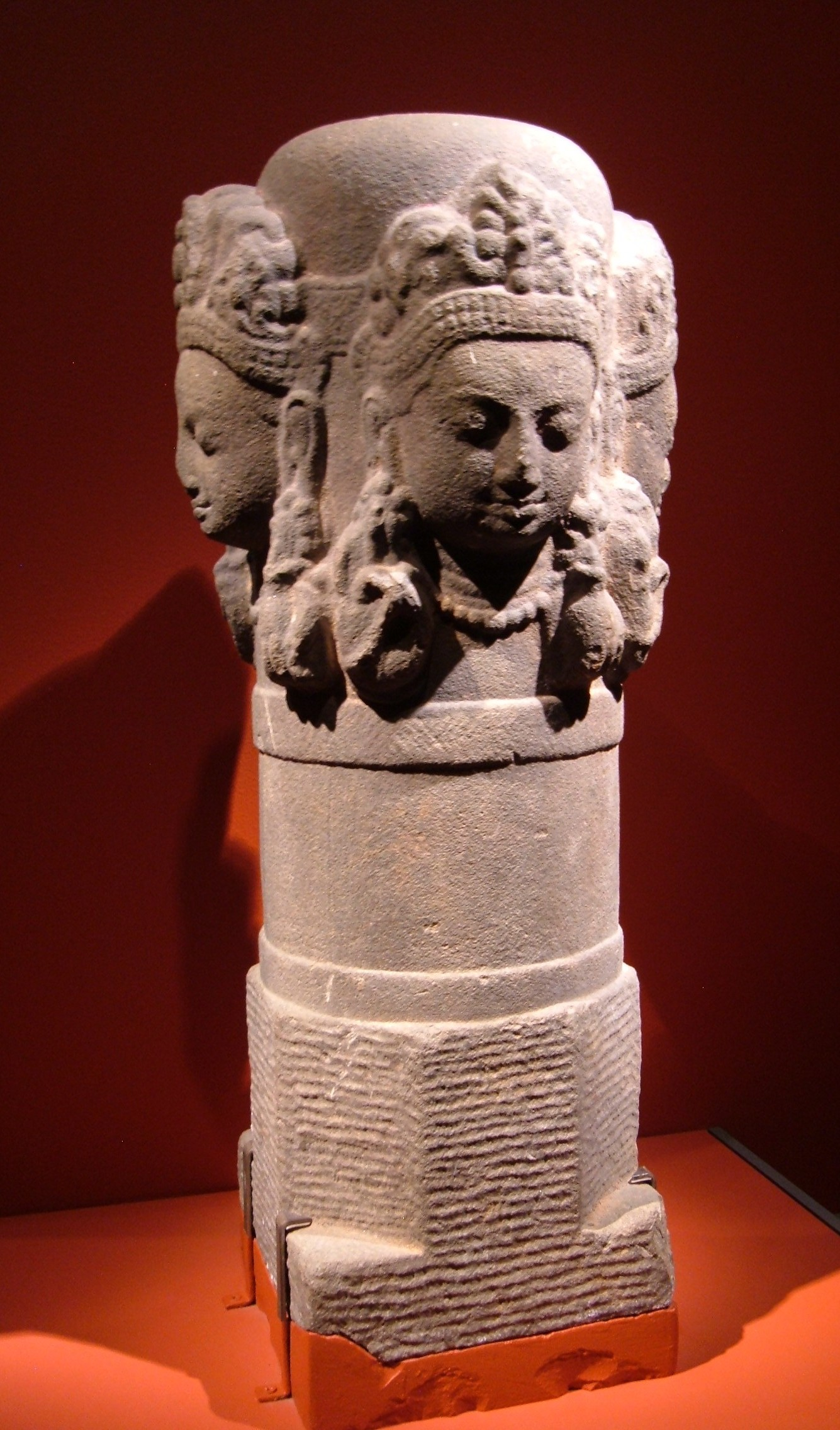
A four-faced mukhalinga, 10th century, Asian Art Museum

A mukhalinga or mukhalingam (Sanskrit: मुखलिङ्गम्, romanized: mukhaliṅga; literally "lingam with a face") is a lingam represented with one or more human faces in Hindu iconography. A lingam is an aniconic representation of the Hindu god Shiva. Mukhalingas may be of stone or can be made of a metal sheath, which covers the normal lingam.

A mukhalinga generally has one, four, or five faces. Mukhalingas having four faces are also regarded to have an invisible fifth face on top of the linga. The four- and five-faced mukhalingas represent the five aspects of Shiva, which also relate to the classical elements, and the cardinal directions.

While the formless aspect of Shiva is classified as nishkala (non-material), mukhalingas are classified as sakala nishkala (material-non-material).

== Iconography of stone Mukhalingas in texts ==
The iconography and making of the mukhalinga is prescribed in the Agamas and the Tantras. These sculptured lingas fall under the classification of manusha-linga ("man-made lingas"), the other category being Swayambhu or naturally occurring lingas. A manusha-linga has three parts: the Brahma-bhaga, the lowest part of the linga which is a square platform; Vishnu-bhaga - the middle section of the linga with a pedestal or pitha and Rudra-bhaga, the topmost part of the central shaft with a rounded tip. Mukhalinga should be sarvasama ("all-equal"), where the three parts are equal. On the topmost rudra-bhaga or puja-bhaga, one face and a maximum of five faces may be carved. If the sanctum (garbhagriha) has only one door, then the linga should have only one face on the front (the east), facing the door. In case of two doors, it should have two faces - front and back - facing the doors in the east and the west. In case of three doors, the linga should have three faces, except in the west. When the shrine has four doors, the linga may have four or five faces. The four faces should face the doors in the four cardinal directions; in addition if a fifth face exists, it should be carved on the top and face the front, the east. When mukhalinga is four-faced, instead of only faces, the busts of the deities are carved on the four side; each having two arms.

The stone mukhalingas may be depicted comprising just of the central shaft, but may be part of the full assemble, where the shaft is embedded in the pitha pedestal, denoting the yoni, the feminine counterpart.

== Mukhalingas as metal sheaths ==
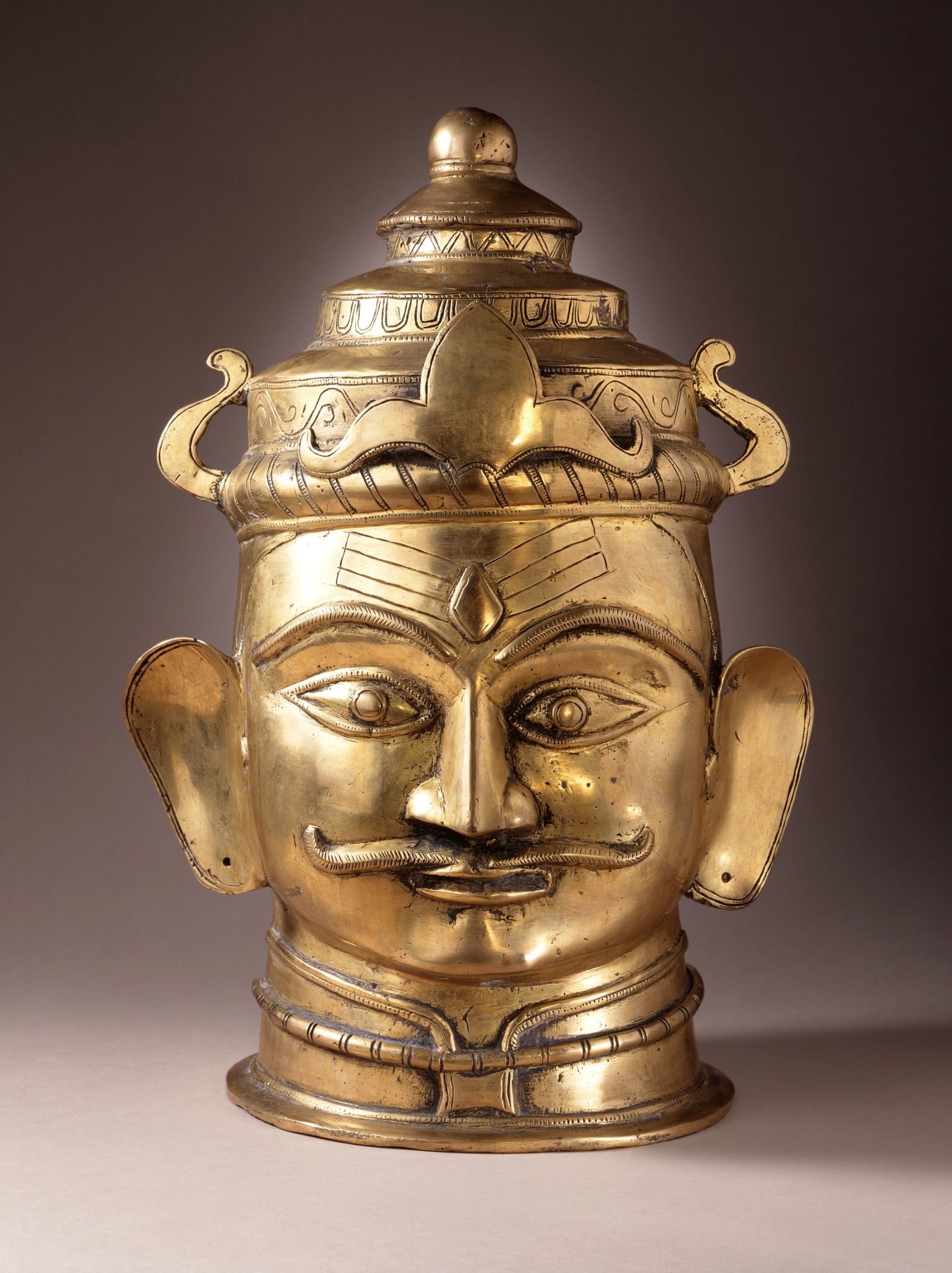
One-faced Mukhalinga, Maharashtra; currently in LACMA

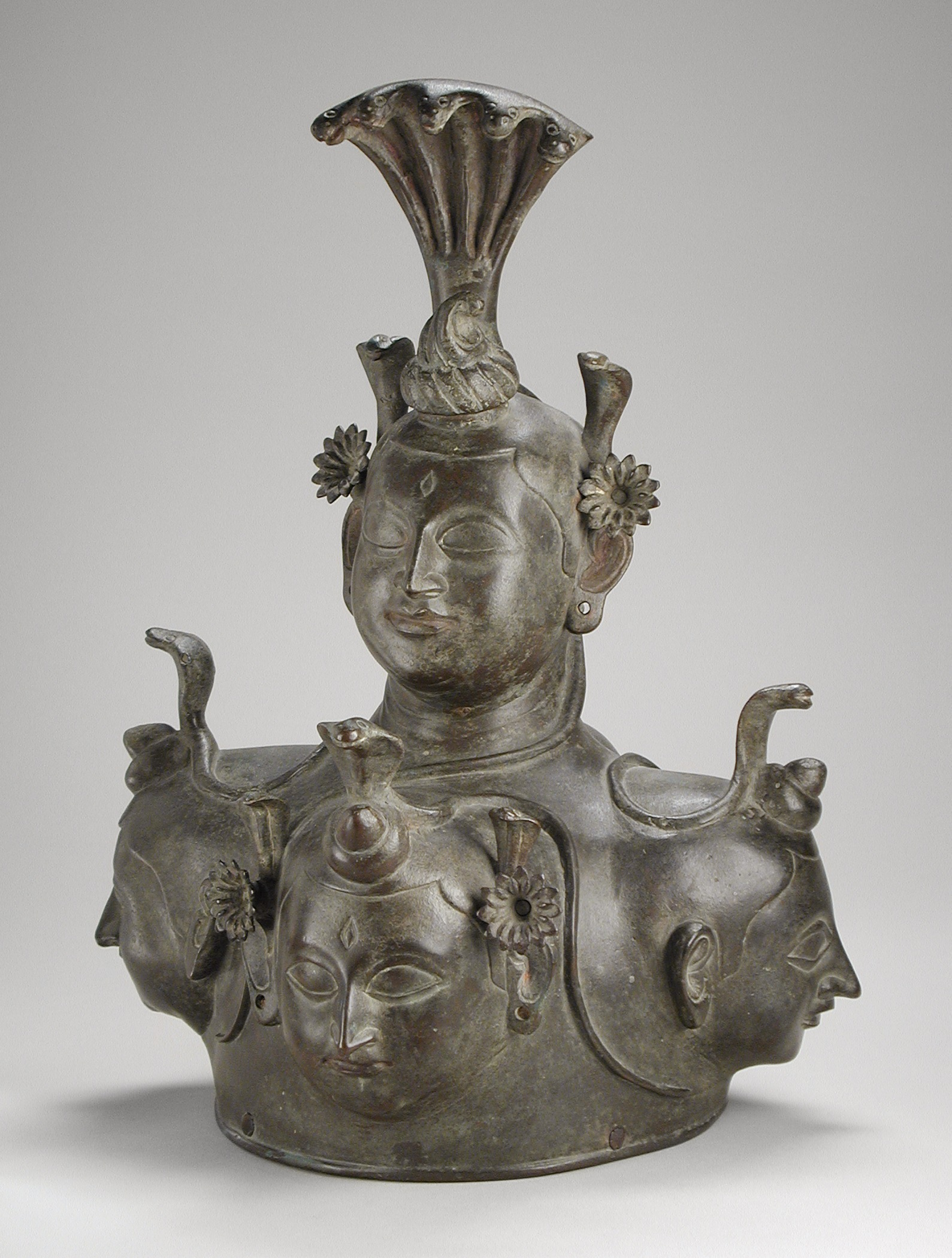
Five-faced Mukhalinga, Himachal Pradesh; currently in LACMA

A normal linga may be converted into a mukhalinga by covering with a kavacha ("armour"), a metal (generally gold) covering carved in the shape of the head of Shiva. It has displays the third eye of Shiva on the forehead, the crescent moon over his head and a crown. The covering or sheath is also known as a kosha or linga-kosha, and can be called of metal alloys, gold or silver or copper. Another form of cover is carved in shape of a linga, with a rounded top, with four faces carved on four sides.

== One-faced Mukhalinga ==
The one-faced mukhalinga is called eka-mukhalinga, "linga with a single face". The face is created in high relief. He wears his hair piled on his head like a bun, while longer hair flow over his shoulders. He may also wear earrings and a necklace and have the crescent moon on his head and the third eye on the forehead. The faces of Shiva are carved generally from the ear onwards, emerging from the linga.

== Four/Five-faced Mukhalinga ==
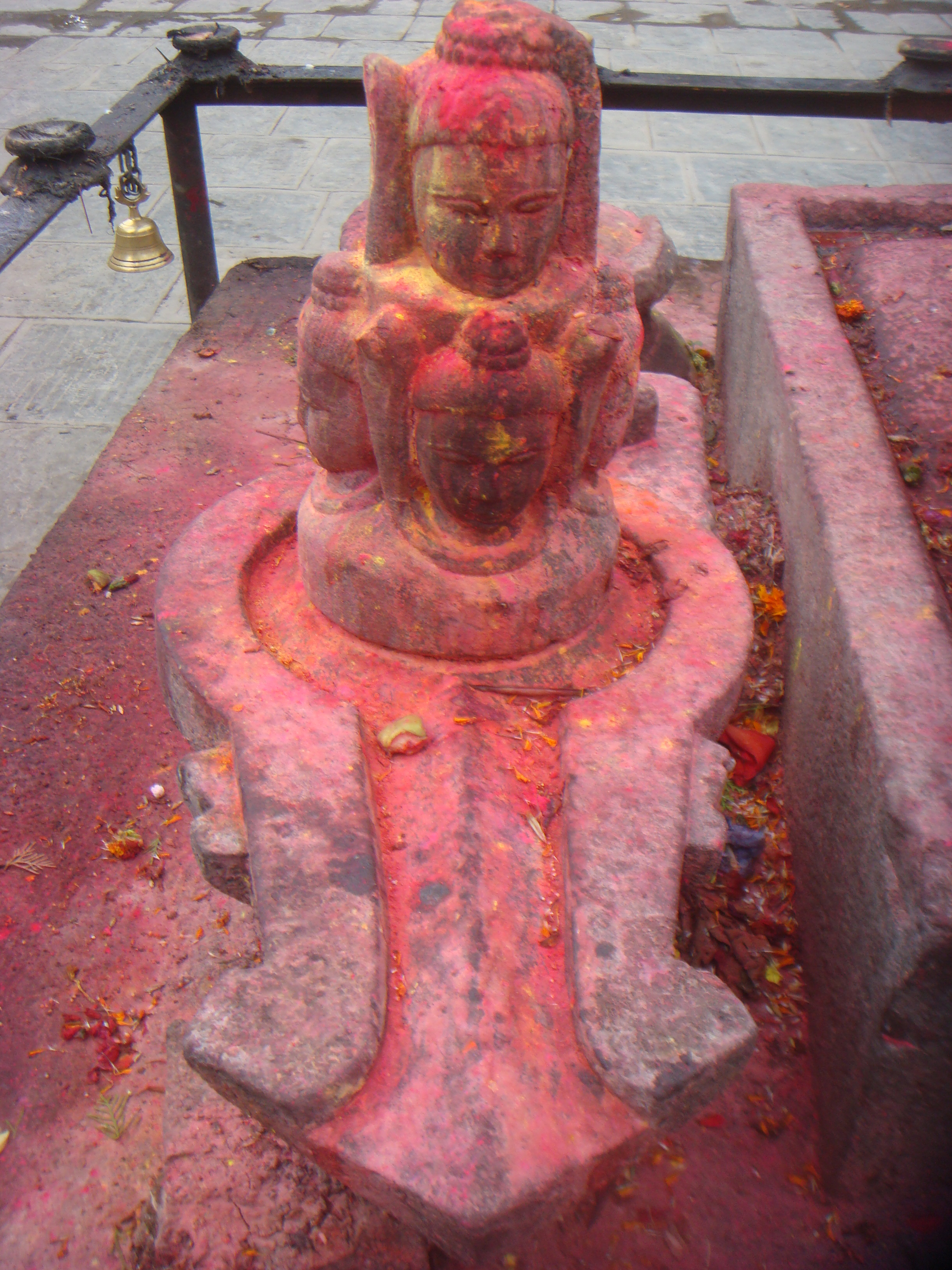
Five-headed Mukhalinga embedded in a yoni; Budanilkantha, Nepal

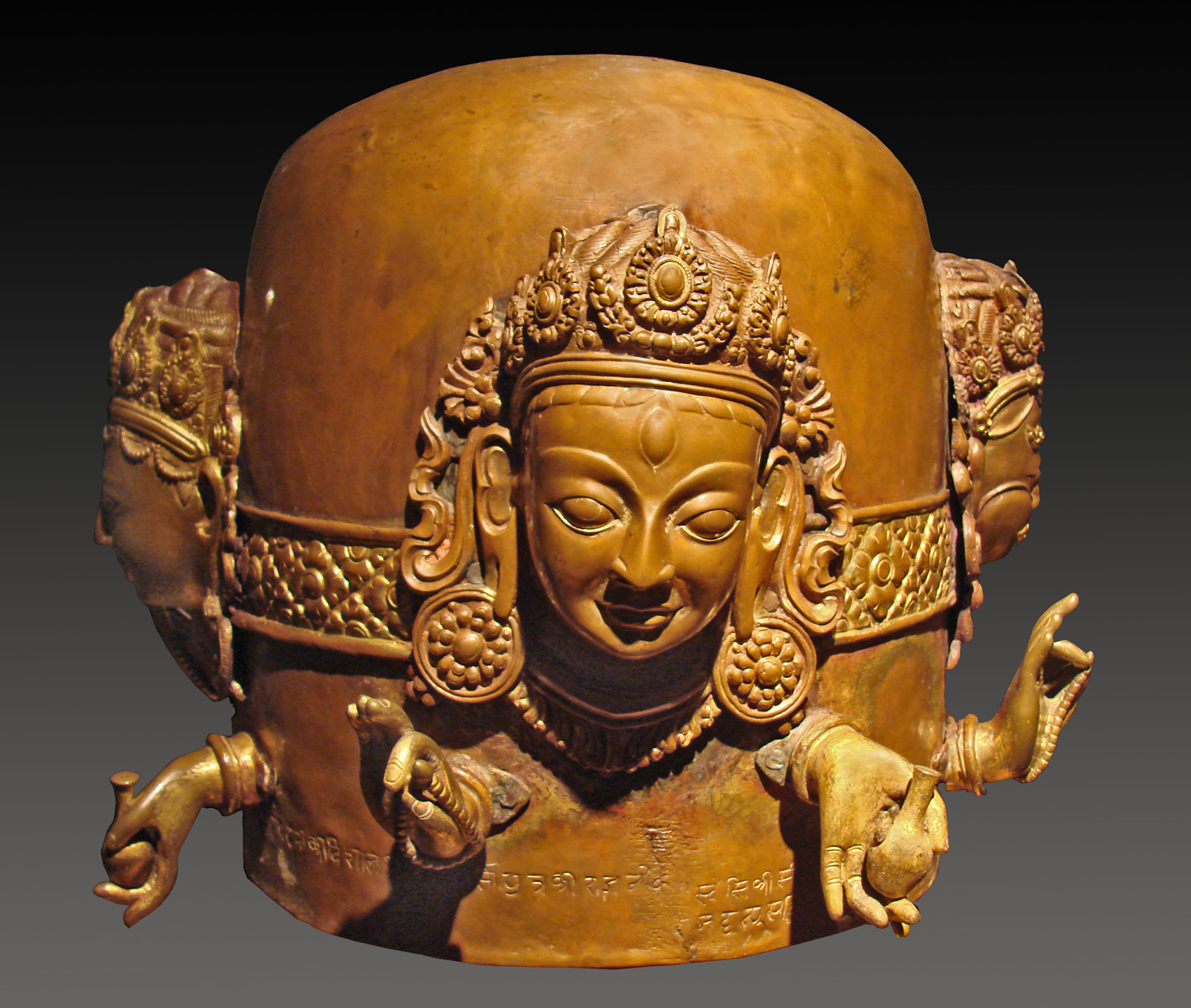
Four-headed metal cover as Mukhalinga, Nepal; currently in Museum of Asian Art

The five-faced mukhalinga is called pancha-mukhalinga. The five faces relate Shiva to the classical elements, the directions, the five senses and five parts of the body. These represent Shiva's five aspects: Sadyojata, Vamadeva, Aghora, Tatpurusha and Ishana. A four-faced linga is said also to represent the five aspects of Shiva, the fifth aspect is center, the shaft itself or is assumed to be emerging from the top of the shaft and denotes the formless Absolute. Thus, a four-faced mukhalinga can be also called a pancha-mukhalinga ("linga with five faces" of Shiva). These four-faced lingas are the most commonly found mukhalingas.

The 13th Century A.D. pancha mukha sivalinga is in Kalahasti, Andhra Pradesh.The fifth face would not be shown to highlight the Nishkala character of Sivalinga.

The top face is known as Ishana or Sadashiva, who is rarely depicted and governs zenith and the sky (Akasha). The east face is Sadyojata or Mahadeva, the regent of the earth (Prithvi). The west face is Tatpurusha or Nandi (Shiva's bull mount) or Nandivaktra (the face of Nandi), denoting the wind, Vayu. While Vamadeva or Uma (Parvati, Shiva's consort) or Umavaktra (the face of Parvati) or Tamreshvara (water, Ap) faces north, Aghora or Bhairava looks south (fire, Agni). In some texts, the eastern face is called and the western one Sadyojata. The icon of the five aspects represents the entire universe.

In Nepal, the four aspects have similar faces. They wear similar crowns and hairstyles and have Shiva's third eye. Mahadeva may have a moustache and has matted hair piled up on his head. Nandi bears on the forehead the sectarian mark (tilaka) of the Shaivas (worshippers of Shiva) and floral earrings. The face of Uma also bears the Shaiva mark and depicts Shiva as Ardhanarishvara, the composite androgynous form of Shiva and Parvati. The right half is the male Shiva with a moustache, while the left half is the female Parvati; the eyes, the lips, the earrings (a serpent and floral earring) as well as the sides of the crown may differ in the halves. Bhairava, the terrible form of Shiva, is generally depicted angry; however may have a gentler expression. He wears serpent-earrings or asymmetrical earrings and has curled hair. All of them are depicted with two hands, carrying an akshamala (rosary) in the right and a water pot in the left. The rosary-bearing hand is held in abhayamudra, gesture of assurance. The rosary signifies Death or Time, while the water-pot stands for its antithesis, amrita, the elixir of life. The hands indicate that Shiva will lead his devotees to moksha, emancipation.

Eight faced shivalinga is located at Mandsaur (Madhya Pradesh) along the banks of River Shivana locally known as "Ashtamukhi Pashupatinath" which is claimed to be unique in terms of its sculpture. The eight faces carved on the lingam exhibit eight moods / facial expressions facing the four directions, two each in one direction placed one above the other.

== Evolution ==
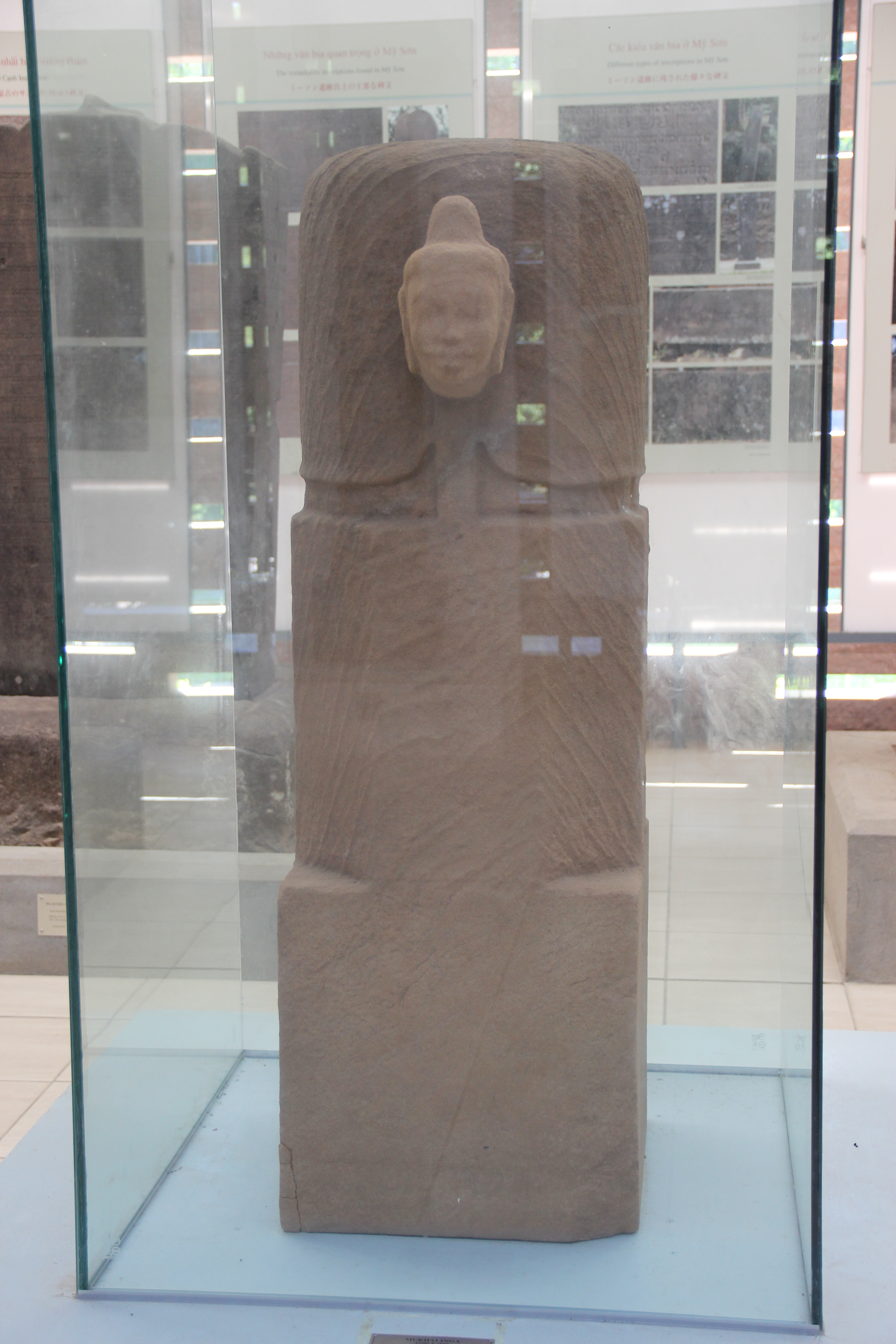
The Cham Ekamukhalinga of Mỹ Sơn, Vietnam

Mukhalingas are found throughout India and Nepal. They also appear in the former Champa kingdom, presently in Vietnam as well as Cambodia and Borneo in the south east Asia and Afghanistan to the west of India. One of earliest specimen of a mukhalinga is a five-faced one in Bhita, which is dated to second century BCE.

Alain Daniélou says that mukhalingas of Shiva resemble similar depictions of phalluses with carved faces from Greece and those from Celtic Europe. He also notes the phalluses with full human figures are also found in France and India, citing the second-century Gudimallam Lingam as an early example.

== See also ==
- Spatika Lingam
