= Dashavatara Temple, Deogarh =

6th century Hindu temple

Dashavatara Temple
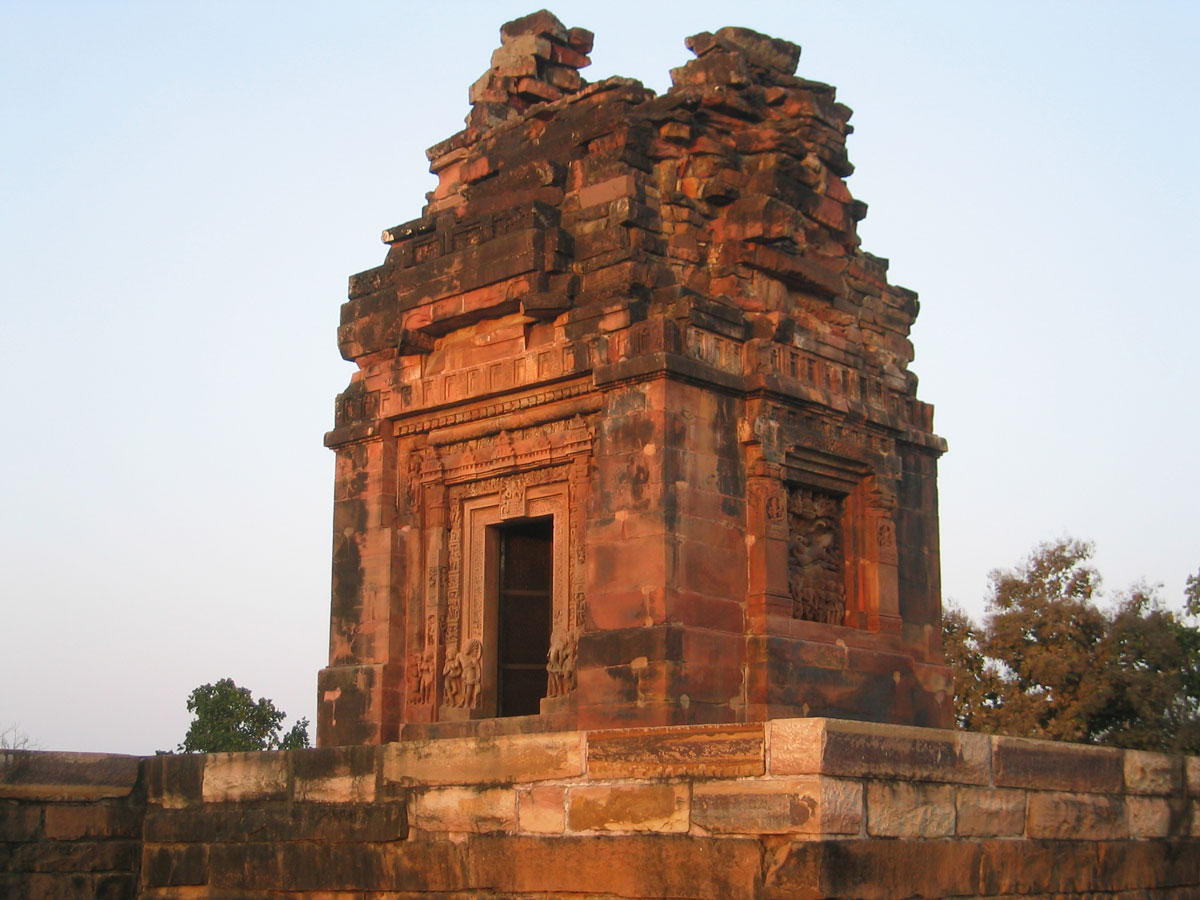
- Dashavatara Temple, Deogarh

Religion
- Affiliation: Hinduism
- District: Lalitpur district
- Deity: Vishnu

Location
- Location: Betwa River valley
- State: Uttar Pradesh
- Country: India
- Interactive map of Dashavatara Temple
- Coordinates: 24°31′35.8″N 78°14′24.4″E

Architecture
- Style: Nagara
- Completed: c. 500 CE

The Dashavatara Temple is an early 6th century Hindu temple located at Deogarh, Lalitpur district, Uttar Pradesh which is 125 kilometers from Jhansi, in the Betwa River valley in northern-central India. It has a simple, one cell square plan and is one of the earliest Hindu stone temples still surviving today. Built in the Gupta Period, the Dashavatara Temple at Deogarh shows the ornate Gupta style architecture.

The temple at Deogarh is dedicated to Vishnu, but includes in it small footprint images of various deities such as Shiva, Parvati, Kartikeya, Brahma, Indra, the river goddesses Ganga and Yamuna, as well as a panel showing the five Pandavas of the Hindu epic Mahabharata. The temple was built out of stone and masonry brick. Legends associated with Vishnu are sculpted in the interior and exterior walls of the temple. Also carved are secular scenes and amorous couples in various stages of courtship and intimacy.

According to Alexander Lubotsky, this temple was built according to the third khanda of the Hindu text Vishnudharmottara Purana, which describes the design and architecture of the Sarvatobhadra-style temple, thus providing a floruit for the text and likely temple tradition that existed in ancient India. Though ruined, the temple is preserved in a good enough condition to be a key temple in the Hindu temple architecture scholarship, particularly the roots of the North Indian style of temple design.

The Dashavatara temple is locally known as Sagar marh, which literally means "the temple on the tank", a name it gets from the square water pool cut into the rock in front.

== Location ==
The temple site is in Deogarh, also spelled Devgarh (Sanskrit: "fort of gods"), in the Betwa River valley at the border of Uttar Pradesh and Madhya Pradesh. It is an ancient Hindu temple below the Deogarh hill, towards the river, about 500 metres (1,600 ft) from a group of three dozen Jain temples with dharmashala built a few centuries later, and the Deogarh Karnali fort built in early 13th-century.

The Dashavatara temple is about 30 kilometres (19 mi) from Lalitpur town in Uttar Pradesh, 220 kilometres (140 mi) west of Khajuraho, 250 kilometres (160 mi) south of Gwalior, 230 kilometres (140 mi) northeast of Bhopal, and about 400 kilometres (250 mi) southwest of Kanpur. The nearest railway station is located in Lalitpur, while the closest major airport with daily services is Khajuraho (IATA: HJR) and Bhopal (IATA: DBH).

The site is on the western edge of the Lalitpur range, with rocky Betwa river rapids about 500 metres (1,600 ft) away, amidst a forest. The British India era archaeologist Alexander Cunningham visited this site in 1875 and called the general location as "singularly picturesque". The fort has several Jain temples, and the Dashavatara temple is solitary Hindu monument midway between the fort and the Deogarh village.

== History ==
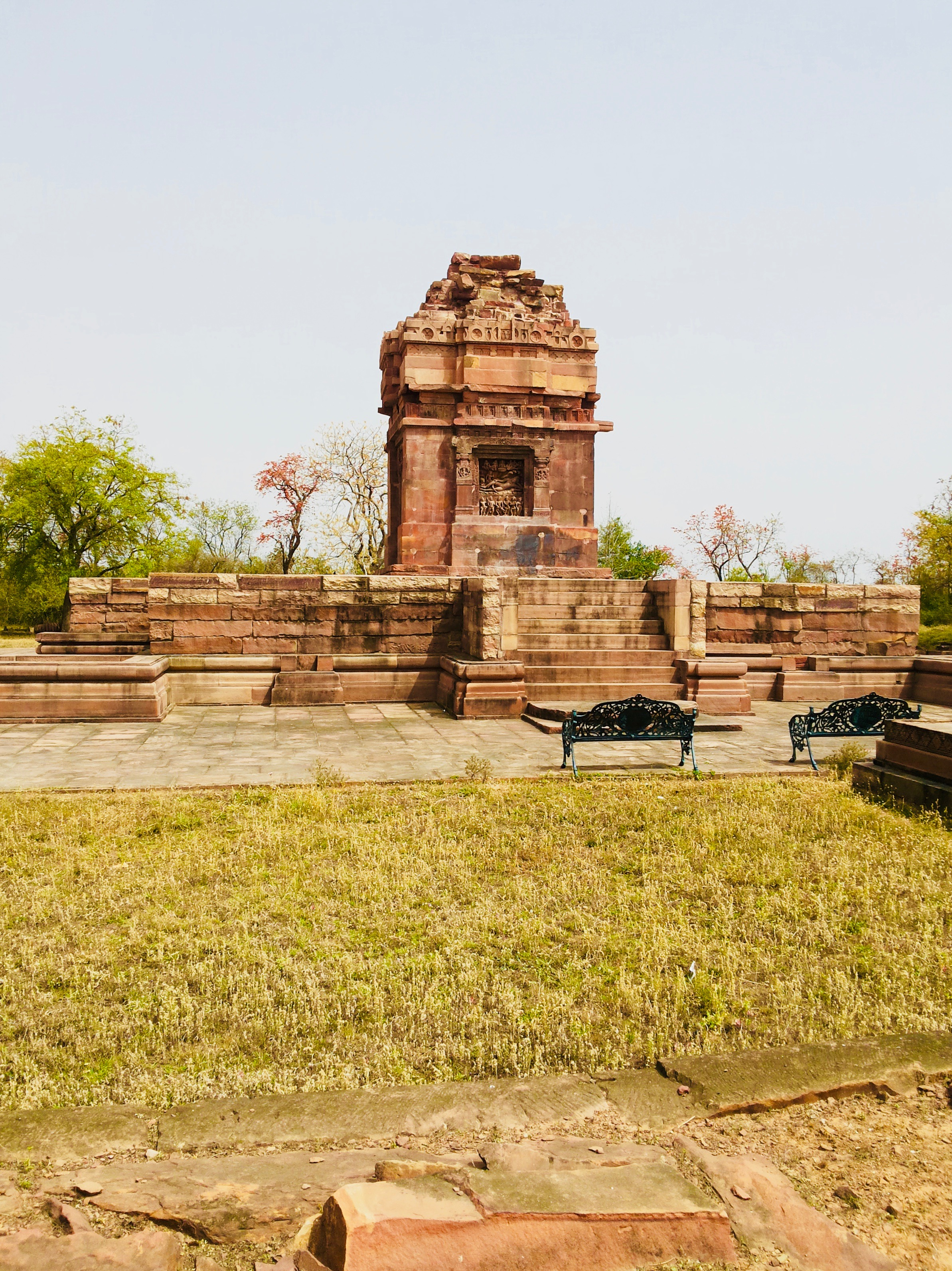
Dashavatara Temple on its jagati.

Deogarh is an ancient site. Numerous inscriptions in different languages and scripts have been found here, as have a series of Hindu, Jain and Buddhist monuments. These suggest that it was once a significant human settlement, likely a location on an imperial trade route that brought people from different linguistic backgrounds to it. According to Madho Vats, Deogarh nestled within picturesque hills in north, west and south along with its abundant waters was conveniently located between the major ancient economic centers such as Pataliputra (Patna), Kashi (Varanasi), Sanchi, Udayagiri, Ujjain, Bhilsa and Bagh. Cunningham in 1875, noted that the inscriptions he found in Deogarh during his tour were in Gupta script and few others he could not decipher. The ones his team was able to read were Hindu Sanskrit inscriptions that started with phrases such as "Om! namah Shivaya! (...)", and the samvat dates included within the inscriptions meant that the various inscriptions ranged from 808 CE to 1164 CE, none before the 8th-century or after the 13th century. Cunningham reported about the colossal statues of Tirthankaras in the Jain temples site and then added an extensive report on the solitary Hindu Deogarh temple which he called the "Gupta Temple". At the very end of his report, he remarked that the architectural style and themes displayed in the Dashavatara temple suggest that the temple must have been built before 700 CE, with his guess being 600 to 700 CE.

Before Cunningham's 1875 report, the temple was visited by Charles Strahan around 1871, who found it midst the jungle growth. Strahan shared his enthusiasm about the temple with Cunningham as follows:

The jungle is heaviest in the immediate neighborhood of Deogarh, where the Betwa is overlooked on either bank by rocky cliffs once sacred to Hindu shrines, whose ruins display the utmost profusion of the art of sculpture, but which now hardly overtop the surrounding trees. One temple of great magnificence, with a broad paved causeway leading from the foot of the hill on which it stands, along the face of the rocks, is of great archaeological interest, some of the sculptures being well preserved.

– Charles Strahan (emphasis according to Cunningham's publication)

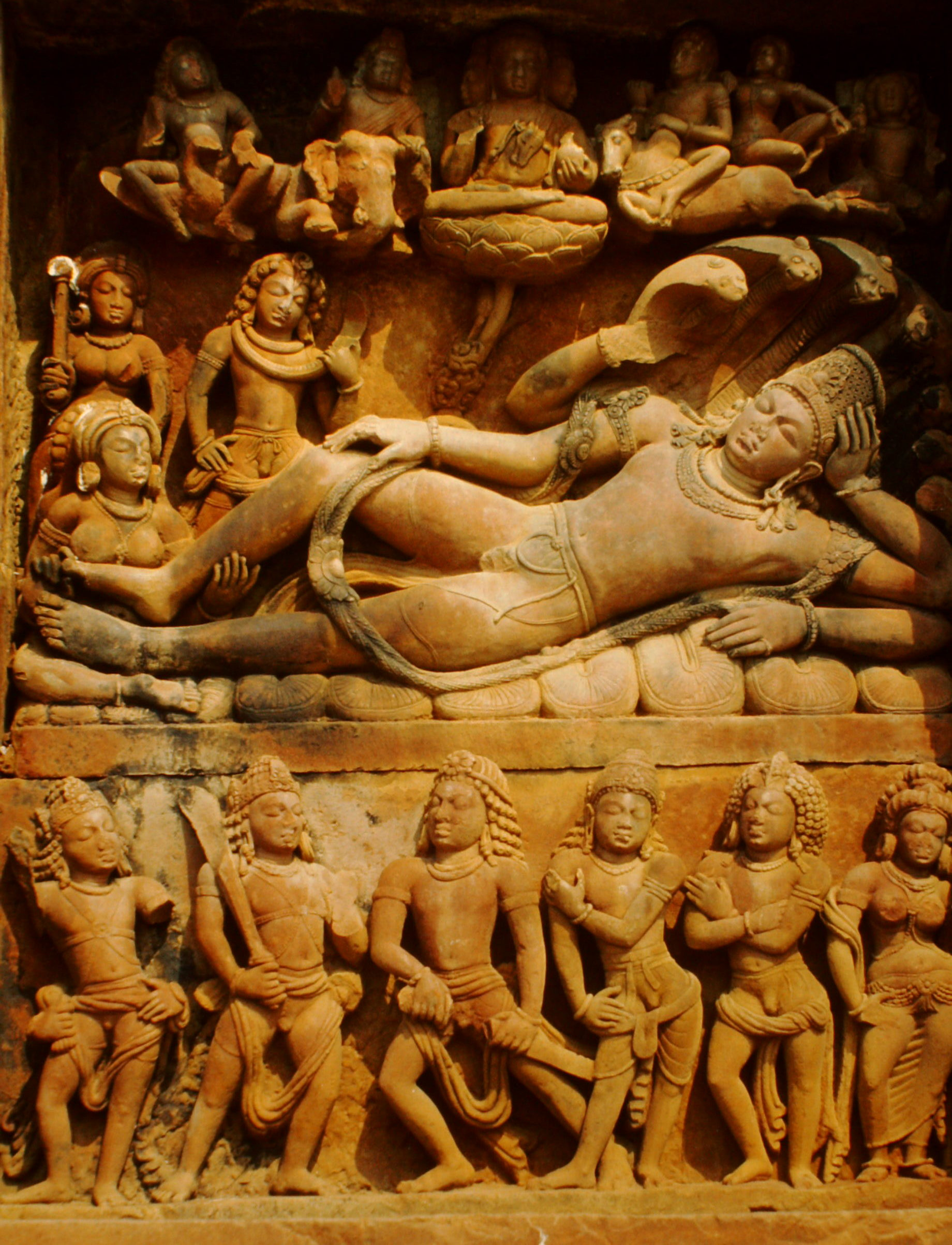
Vishnu sleeping, protected by Shesha

In 1899, P.C. Mukerji surveyed the site more comprehensively on the behalf of Archaeological Survey of India. He noticed the profusion of Vishnu imagery in the reliefs and accepted the local oral tradition that claimed that the ten avatars of Vishnu were carved on the temple but are now missing. In his report, he called it the Dashavatara temple and mentioned the local Sagar Marh name for the temple.

In the decades following the Mukerji's report, excavations in the Deogarh region in early 20th-century such as those by Daya Ram Sahni yielded evidence of more Hindu shrines as well inscriptions, Jain temples and Buddhist monuments. These include the Naharghati inscriptions, a monastic cave and the inscribed relief of Saptamatrikas (seven mothers, Shaktism). In 1918, Sahini also found panels from the temple buried near the foundation and used by someone to build a wall nearby. These panels narrated scenes from the Hindu epic Ramayana. According to Bruhn, the Deogarh Naharghati inscriptions, cave and sculptures are all Hindu monuments and one of richest archaeological findings in Deogarh area, and they include Gupta era art, several early and late Nagari script inscriptions, an early Mahishasura-mardini Durga relief, Shiva lingas and various Hindu statues.

In early 20th-century, the missing ten avatars that Sahni knew about but no one else had seen proof of, led to a debate whether the temple should be called Dashavatara temple or something else. However, the excavations and subsequent study of reliefs from the Deogarh temple site by scholars such as Vats yielded the evidence of reliefs showing Krishna, Narasimha, Vamana, Buddha, Rama, and others. (Note: Many of these later exacavated reliefs are now at major museums, the largest collection at the National Museum in Delhi, and a few in ASI Museum in Deogarh. The Delhi Museum has Deogarh temple reliefs that narrate the legends of Krishna.) Thereafter the temple has generally been known as the Dashavatara temple of Deogarh. According to Vats, the evidence suggests that a large number of reliefs that existed in late 19th century went missing in the first few decades of the 20th century. Much of the Dashavatara temple, along with Jain temples nearby, are in ruins and shows signs of damage. (Note: The region, like the rest of central and north India, witnessed wars and destruction during the Muslim invasion and Sultanate period. The region was conquered by Ain-ul-mulk, a Muslim commander of Delhi Sultanate who was then appointed as the governor. Later, Malwa Sultans ruled the Chanderi region, then Mughals through 17th-century. After the Muslim Mughal rule, the Hindu Maratha Empire conquered this region, then came British India. Deogarh belonged to the Chanderi region, but Deogarh was not a political center or hub during this period. According to Klaus Bruhn, the role of Muslims in the history of Deogarh site is unclear. All theories about who caused the destruction is speculative, because Muslim writers of the Sultanate period do not mention Deogarh, nor do any inscriptions found in Deogarh mention any raids by anyone. Inscriptions in the Indian tradition, states Bruhn, tend to focus on donations and positive things rather than record historical destruction. The larger temples in Deogarh show signs of more damage, but not the smaller ones though the latter would have been weaker and easier to destroy. It is possible, though also a speculation, that someone used Deogarh monuments as quarry for some unestablished project. In 1956, the state of Madhya Pradesh was created whose boundary with Uttar Pradesh, in part was set by River Betwa. Deogarh, therefore, became a part of Uttar Pradesh, though its history is more connected with that of Gwalior and Malwa region.)

Archaeologists have inferred that it is the earliest known Panchayatana temple in North India. It was subsequently renamed by Cunningham as Dashavatara Mandir or Dashavatara Temple (because the temple depicts ten incarnations of Vishnu), and also as Sagar Marh (meaning: the temple by the well).

=== Date ===
The Dashavatara temple is generally dated between late 5th-century and early 6th-century, or about 500 CE. Benjamín Preciado-Solís, a professor of Indian History specializing in Hindu and Buddhist iconography, dates it to the 5th century. According to George Michell, an art historian and a professor specializing in Hindu Architecture, it is unclear when exactly the Dashavatara temple was built but its style suggests the sixth century. Michael Meister, another art historian and professor of Indian temple architecture, dates the temple to between 500 and 525 CE.

== Description ==
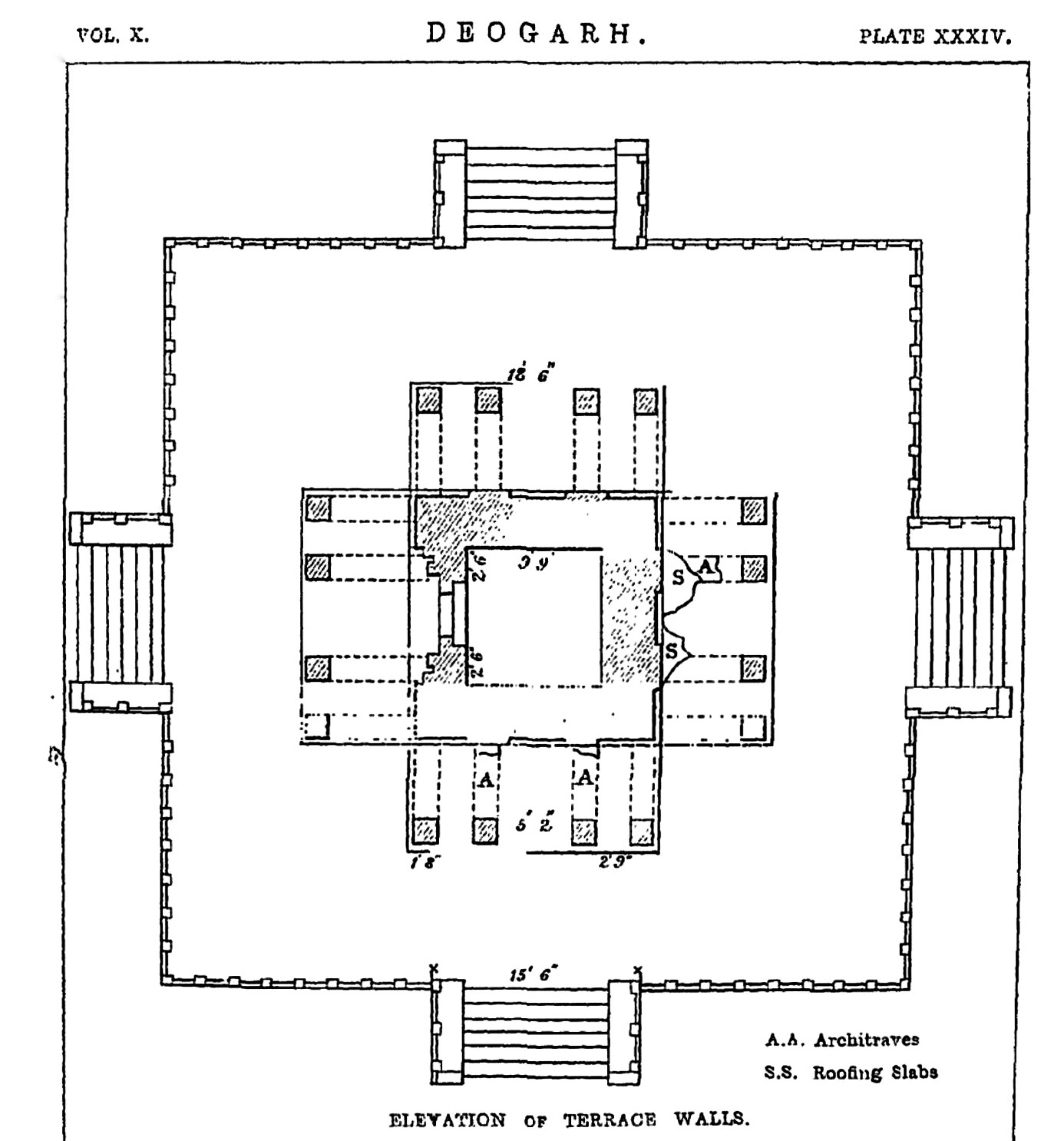
1880 sketch of 9-squared Dashavatara temple plan (not to scale, some parts not shown) (Note: For an aerial view and more complete/accurate plan, see Vats's drawings.)

The Dashavatara temple has a high plinth (jagati) and is set with a basement porch. The temple provides steps in the center of all sides of the platform to let the pilgrim enter the temple from all four directions.The temple is a masterpiece of Indian architecture.

The temple faces west, with slight deviation to the south that enables the setting sun's rays to fall on the main idol in the temple. The plinth is square with a 55.5 feet (16.9 m) side, about 9 feet (2.7 m) above the bottom step (called the moon stone) of the shrine. Each corner of the platform has an 11 feet (3.4 m) square projection with remnants of a shrine. The plinth was molded in four parallel courses, each molding about 0.95 feet (0.29 m) thick. Above the four moldings, rectangular panels separated by pilasters ran all along the plinth with friezes narrating Hindu texts such as the Ramayana and the Mahabharata. Some of these friezes are now in museums such as the National Museum in Delhi. These show, for example, the narratives from the Krishna legend.

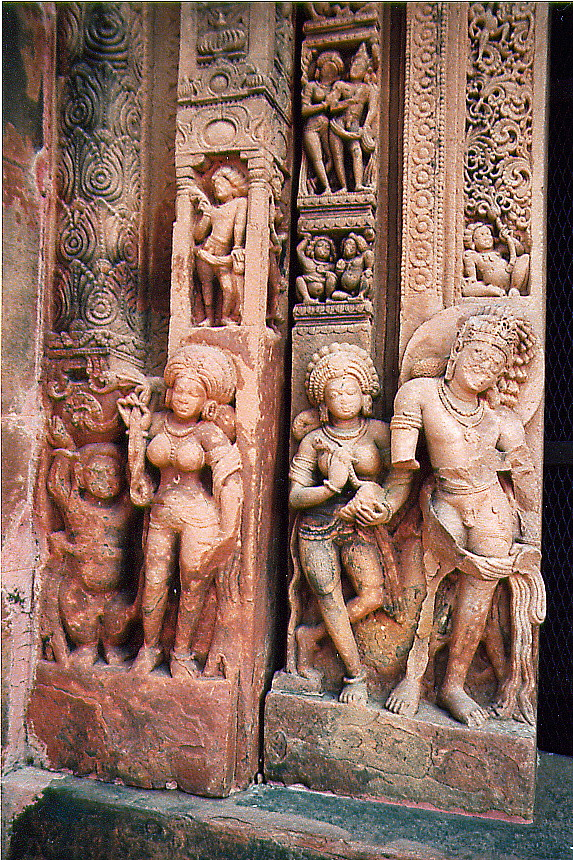
Sanctum door reliefs.

On the platform is a nine squares layout. The surviving Vishnu temple is in the middle square. The sanctum is a square with 18.5 feet (5.6 m) side. Its doorway is intricately carved with reliefs. The images on the top of the lintel of the sanctum and walls show Vishnu and Lakshmi, flanked by Shiva, Parvati, Indra, Kartikeya, Ganesha, Brahma and others. The outer wall of the sanctum on three sides have niches with sculptures of Vishnu legends: Gajendra-moksha flying in with Garuda, Nara-Narayana seated in lalitasana position, and Anantasayi Vishnu in reclining position.

On the top of the sanctum is the remnants of sikhara of the Dashavatara temple. According to Vats, this sikhara is one of the earliest extant lithic illustration in North India along with the one in Mundeshvari temple in Bihar. The Deogarh temple is built on a square plan, while the Mundeshvari temple is built on an octagonal plan. The Deogarh temple sikhara was pyramidal of receding tiers (tala), with a straight edge.

The Dashavatara Temple is closely related to the iconic architectural temple structure described in the Vishnudharmottara Purana, and can be interpreted as an architectural representation of the Chaturvyuha concept and the Pancaratra doctrine, centering on the depictions of the four main emanations of Vishnu: Vāsudeva, Samkarshana, Pradyumna and Aniruddha.

=== Sculptures ===
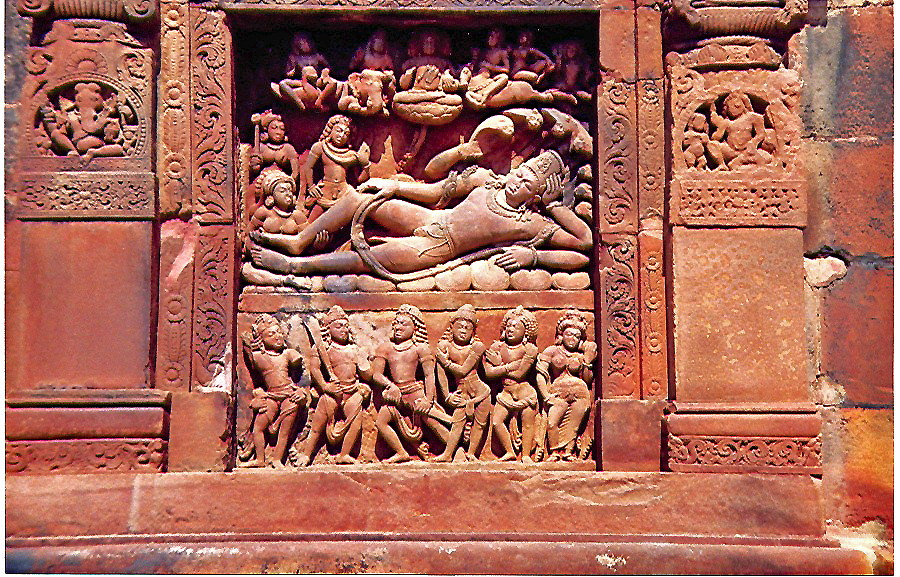
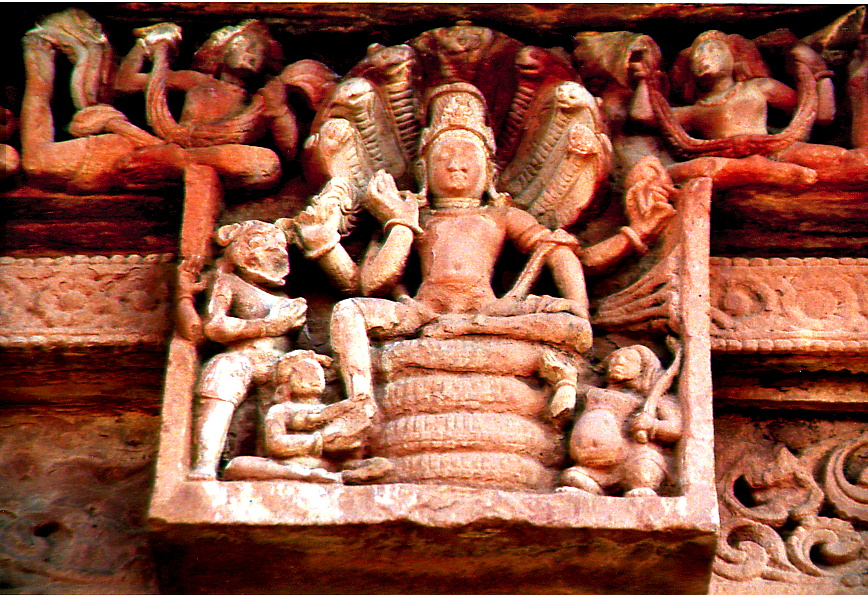
Left: Sheshashayi Vishnu reclining on the serpent-bed of Shesha. Right: Vishnu in sitting posture under the serpent's hood

Sculpted panels are seen on the terraced basement, with carved figurines of river goddesses Ganga and Yamuna flanking the doorway to the sanctum sanctorum, standing respectively on their vahanas: crocodile and tortoise. The panels of the stone door have intricate carvings showing amorous couples in different stages of courtship and intimacy. On the facade are two males standing, one holding a flower and the other a garland as if greeting the visitor.

The relief on the doorway lintel of the sanctum shows Vishnu. He is four-armed, holds his iconic conch shell in his rear left hand, the iconic chakra in his rear right, front right hand is in abhaya mudra while the left front is on his thigh. Below him, to his right, is a female figure presumably Lakshmi but her iconic details are missing. To the right, he is flanked by standing Narasimha (the man-lion avatar of Vishnu) in namaste posture, while on left is a dwarf who has been interpreted as Vamana (the dwarf avatar), or more often Gana as he lacks the iconic details of Vamana.

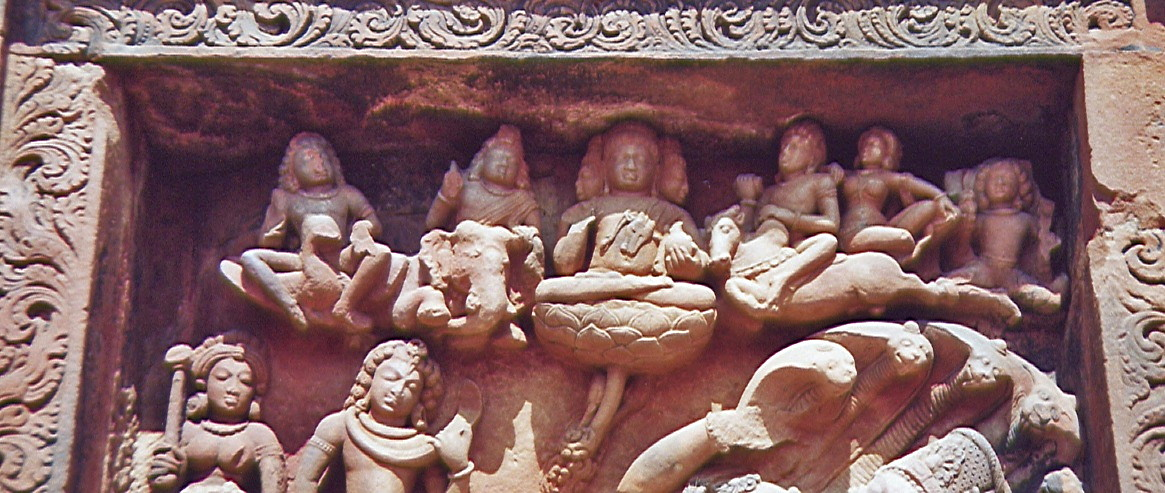
A relief at Dasavatara temple (L to R): Kartikeya, Indra, Brahma, Shiva, Parvati, Nandi.

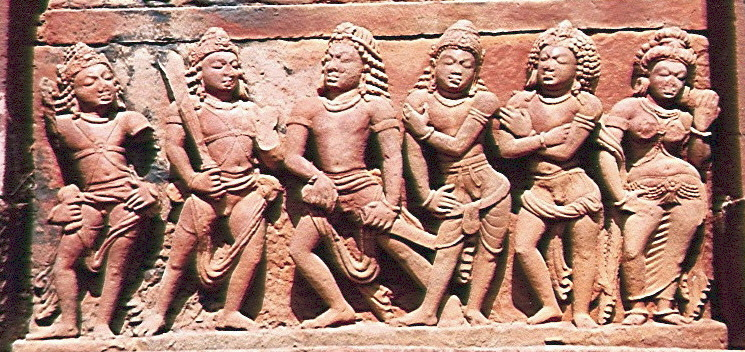
Mahabharata relief (L to R): Arjuna, Bhima, Yudhisthira, Nakula, Sahadeva and Draupadi. (Note: This panel is controversial. Vats offers a second interpretation, stating that the left four are Kaumodaki, Sudarsana, Sarnga and Nandaka preparing to fight the two demons who have appeared as male Kaitabha and female Madhu.)

On the outer walls of each side of the sanctum are niches. Each niche has an alto-relievo of Vaishnava mythology:

- On the north side is the Gajendra Moksha in a niche that is 3.25 feet by 5 feet (0.65:1 ratio). A symbolic elephant is praying for help with his leg inside a pond and lotus flower in his trunk, where he is being strangled. Vishnu is shown flying in on Garuda to liberate the elephant from evil strangulation.
- On the east side is the Nara Narayana alto-relievo. Nara and Narayana are seated in meditation in lalitasana. Both of them hold a rosary in hand, are shown to be with closed eyes and calm, as if lost in their meditation. Apsaras are shown flying above with cusped hands as if showering flowers. Below Nara and Narayana sit lion and deer in peace and without anxiety. The panel also has four headed Brahma seated on lotus and in lotus asana.
- In the south side niche is the Anantasayi Vishnu legend as he rests after creating a new cosmic cycle. He sleeps on Sesha whose 7-headed hood shades him. Lakshmi is sitting near Vishnu's feet and shown caressing his right leg. Vishnu is wearing an elaborate crown (kiritamukuta) and neck, ear, arm and body jewelry. A miniature four headed Brahma is above in center, but he does not emerge from Vishnu navel (a version found in later-dated Puranas). Brahma also has only two hands, with one holding his iconic kamandalu (water pot). Others flanking Brahma are Indra and Kartikeya (Skanda) on one side, Siva and Parvati on Nandi, and a person with a garland. Below the reclining Vishnu is a panel depicting the five males (Pandavas) and one female (Draupadi) of the Mahabharata legend.

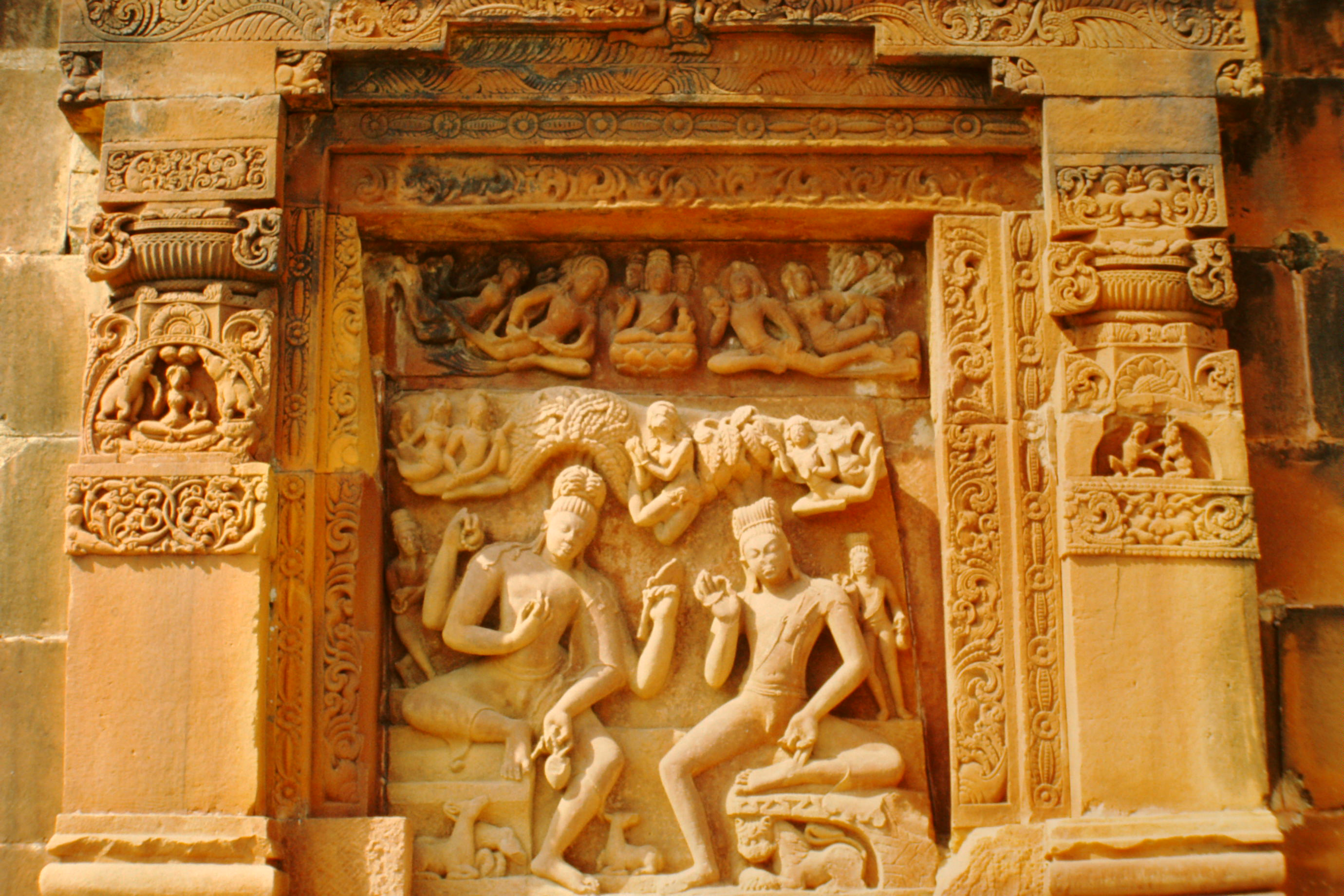
Nara Narayana panel on the eastern wall of the Vishnu temple

According to Lubotsky, it is likely that the entrance is dedicated to the Vāsudeva aspect of Vishnu; the Anantashayana side is his role as the creator (Aniruddha); the sage form of Nara-Narayana side symbolizes his preservation and maintainer role in cosmic existence (Pradyumna); and the Gajendramoksha side represents his role as the destroyer (Samkarsana).

=== Reliefs and museums ===
The Dashavatara temple had numerous plinth panels of about 2.5 feet by 2 feet each, with friezes related to secular life and themes of Hinduism. Some of these reliefs were found during excavations at the site, some recovered nearby and identified by their location, the material of construction and the style. Many are lost. The recovered reliefs are now housed in major museums. Some of the significant reliefs identified include:

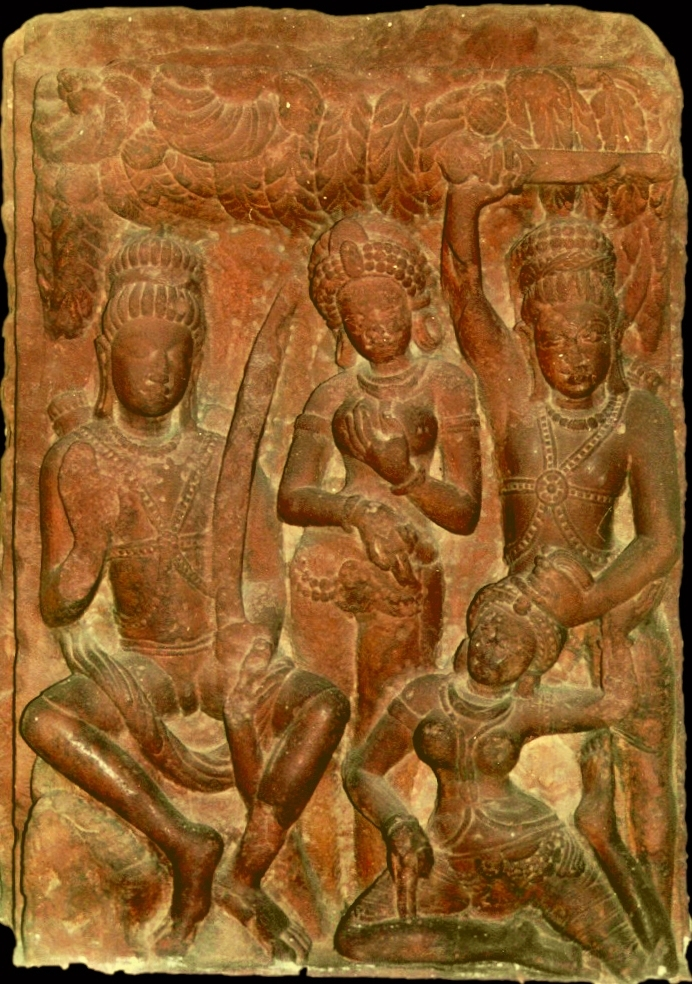
A Deogarh temple Ramayana relief now in National Museum, Delhi; L to R: Rama, Sita, Lakshmana, in lower right is demoness Surpanakha caught after harassing Sita and Rama.

- Ramayana scenes: a panel depicts the Ahalya-uddhara legend where Hindu god Rama redeems Ahalya. The scene shows Ahalya in a reverential state offering flowers, Rama and Lakshmana holding their bows, and a rishi monk sitting nearby with a rosary. Other legends include the departure of Rama, Sita and Lakshmana for their exile; the three arriving at sage Atri's hermitage; the Surpanakha legend; the Dandaka forest legend; the abduction of Sita by Ravana; the bullying of Sita by Ravana legend; the Sugriva victory legend and the Hanuman bringing the herb containing mountain for Lakshmana legend.
- Mahabharata and Vishnu Purana scenes: a panel narrates the Krishna's birth in a prison legend; Yashoda and Nanda playing with Baladeva and Krishna; Krishna battling Kamsa legend; Krishna stealing bathing gopi clothes and two nude women concealing their breasts; the Sudama legend and a few others. One of the panels shows the Vamana, Bali and Trivikrama legend; another the Narasimha saving Prahlada legend.
- Secular life scenes: A number of panels show solitary women with various expressions; small boys playing; girls picking flowers in a field; six girls together of which five are watching and one is dancing; five girls of which one in center is dancing and the other four are playing musical instruments; a woman giving a baby to a man so that he can hold the baby but the man stands indifferent; and others.
- Kama and mithuna scenes: lovers are shown as if having a conversation with one of his hand on her shoulder, the shy woman looking the other way; she sitting in his lap and he fondling her breasts; a man and woman with intertwined bodies, her body reclined on his; a man turning away while the woman embracing him from behind and clinging to him; another panel showing a woman declining a man making advances; and others.

Another sculpture found in the Vishnu temple depicts the Krishna legend in which Devaki hands over her new born son Krishna to her husband Vasudeva. This sculpture is said to be one of the best depictions of Gupta period art, based on the sensuous and graceful modelling of the figurines, but different in that its clothes are shown draped in an exclusive fashion. It is now housed at the National Museum in New Delhi.

The panels show the culture and dress of ancient India. The jewelry and clothing including dhoti, sari, kurta, lahanga, blouse, pleated skirt, dopatta (uttariya), langoti, neck wear and others.

=== Textual roots ===
The Hindu treatise Vishnudharmottara Purana describes several temples including a "Sarvatobhadra temple", which has been compared by archaeologists and Indologists with the Dashavatara Temple (Vishnu temple) or the Gupta Mandir of Deogarh. According to Lubotsky, a comparative study suggests that the ideal temple design and iconography described in the treatise as "Sarvatobhadra temple" was the same as the Vishnu temple of Deogarh. This conclusion was based on plan, size, iconography and several other norms described for building the Sarvatobhadra style Hindu temples. Based on this comparison, the structural details of the Deogarh temple have been inferred. Maps have also been drawn of the temple structure. The probable date of the temple's construction has been estimated to be between 425 and 525.

The Sarvatobhadra design requires a superstructure with nine sikharas. The Dasavatara temple at Deogarh shows only one "shikara", and right squares with no remnant structure. Lubotsky acknowledges that this aspect of the Sarvatobhadra design cannot be fully established by existing evidence. However, the supporting features of copings and amalakas (a bulbous stone finial) have been found in the ruins, which supports the theory that more shikaras existed on eight mandapas, as part of the temple.

Four stairways outside the platform provide access to the temple. However, as per excavation details, combined with the two small shrines with the central shrine seen now, the layout of the temple has been interpreted to represent a typical Panchayatana style of the temples of North India. The total height of the shrine based on isometric projections is about 45 feet (14 m). Provision of porches has not been corroborated but some analogous comparison with the Varaha temple (boar incarnation of Vishnu) in the fort precincts, which belonged to the same period, suggests the existence of porticoes even in the Vishnu temple. Further, a later date Kuriya Bira temple about 2 miles (3.2 km) to the south of the Vishnu temple, has been cited to substantiate that this temple had a mandapa around a small shikara shrine, as required in the Sarvatobhadra design.

According to Lubotsky, the Deogarh temple tallied with the description provided for the Sarvatobhadra temple in the ancient treatise of Vishnudharmottara Purana.

== Reception ==
The Vishnu temple's uniqueness has been expressed succinctly by archaeologist Percy Brown, in these words:

When complete, this building was unquestionably one of rare merit in the correct ordering of its parts, all alike serving the purpose of practical utility, yet imbued with supreme artistic feeling. Few monuments can show such a high level of workmanship, combined with a ripeness and rich refinement in its sculptural effect as the Gupta temple at Deogarh.

=== Reconstructions Proposed ===
Cunningham had originally proposed a reconstruction of the temple with four columns on each side supporting a portico and a shikhara topped by an amalaka. However Vats and Imig have proposed that it was a panchayatana temple. Imig compared a number of temples from the region and from other regions from similar period, and concluded that the garbhagriha (sanctum) cell was surrounded by a wall forming an ambulatory.

== See also ==
- Jain temple, Deogarh
- Pataini temple
- Bhitargaon
- Sanchi
- Tigawa
- Vidisha
- Nachna Hindu temples
- Bhumara
