= Jain temples of Deogarh =

Historic group of Jain temples in India

Jain temple complex, Deogarh
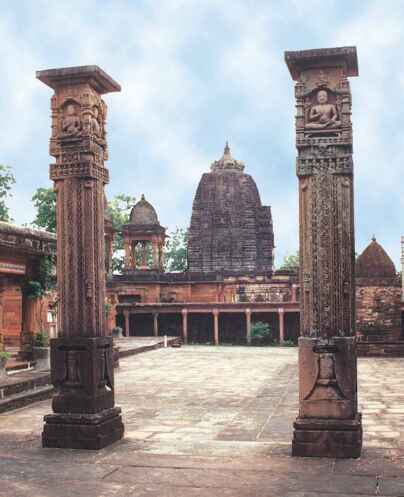
- Shantinath temple

Religion
- Affiliation: Jainism
- Sect: Digambar
- Deity: Shantinatha
- Festival: Mahavir Jayanti
- Governing body: Shri Devgarh Managing Digambar Jain Committee

Location
- Location: Deogarh, Uttar Pradesh
- Interactive map of Jain temple complex, Deogarh
- Coordinates: 24°31′24.4″N 78°14′14.7″E

Architecture
- Established: 8th century
- Temple: 31

The Jain Temple complex is group of 31 Jain temples located at Deogarh in Lalitpur district, Uttar Pradesh built around 8th to 17th century CE. The Jain complex in Deogarh are protected by the Archaeological Survey of India (ASI), and managed through its Northern Circle Office located in Lucknow. ASI maintain an archaeological museum at the Deogarh site, which is noted for its treasured archaeological sculptures.

== History ==
The fort temples are dominated by the Jain temples in the eastern part of the hill fort; the Jain images here are mostly of the "iconographic and the stylistic variety". The Jain complex was built during period from 8th to 17th century, and consist of 31 Jain temples housing around 2,000 sculptures which are largest such collection in world. The Jain temples have a large number of panels depicting scenes from Jain mythology, tirthankara images and votive tablets. The pillars are carved with a thousand Jain figures.

There are 31 Jain temples of different sizes, age and character. All these are dated later than the Hindu temples. They are categorized into two distinct periods: the early medieval period and the medieval period. During the Islamic iconoclastic depredations the temples were devastated; this was compounded by the growth of vegetation and neglect of maintenance. The Jain community is managing the temples since 1939 and have done some restoration work.

== Architecture ==
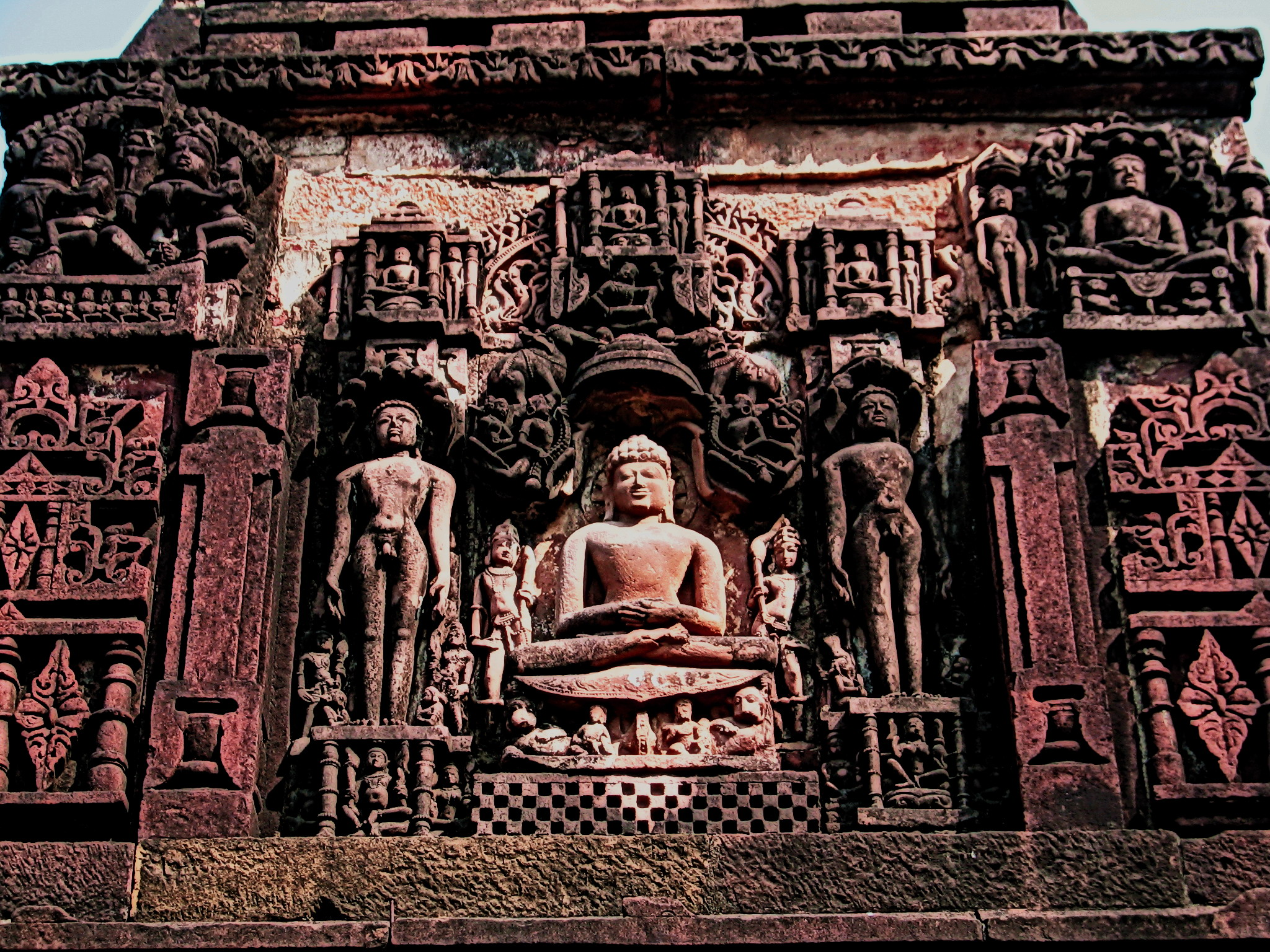
Carvings of tirthankaras on Shantinath temple wall.

The Jain temples have also been examined individually and reports prepared by ASI. The number of images and inscriptions for each temple has been recorded. These findings testify their political history and early medieval status. Out of the many sculptures in the Jaina compound, more than 400 carvings were worthy of recording for their "stylistic and iconographic variety".

The extravagance of the intricacies of the Jain sculptures is similar to that of nearby Gwalior in Madhya Pradesh and adjoining areas of Bihar. Jain sculptures lie scattered on both sides of the path from the gate, on the walls of the fort. A notable pillar seen here is called the Manastambha. The complete image of each of the 24 Tirthankaras. Images of Yaksha and Yakshini are also part of such depictions. Thousands of sculptures are seen embedded in the walls surrounding the complex. A large number of idols lying scattered around the fort area is attributed to the fact that this was the sculptors' workshop.

Worship at some of the Jain temples is still held regularly. The most famous of the Jain temples in the fort is the Shantinath Temple, which was built before 862 AD. It is a testament that a prosperous Jain community lived in this region.

== Restoration ==
In 1959, robbers looted several Jain images or even cut off heads of many idols. This resulted in the Jain community of the area taking precautionary action by setting up a temple committee. This temple committee oversees the protection of the monuments and works to improve the ambience of the entire place. However, as per claims the restoration works being carried out on more scientific terms, following guidelines set by "UNESCO's World Heritage Sites". The Jain temple complex in Deogarh is protected by the Department of Archaeology of the Archaeological Survey of India (ASI).

== Gallery ==
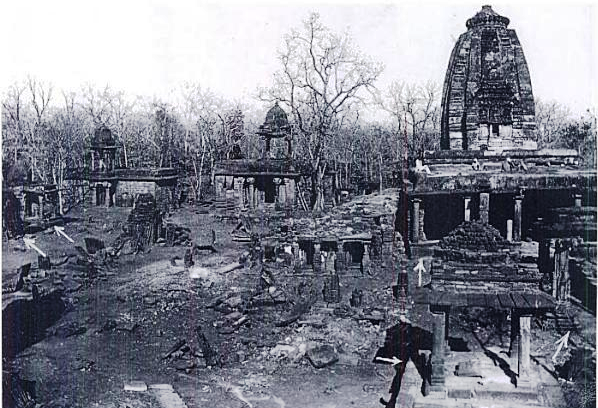
Deogarh temple complex in 1918

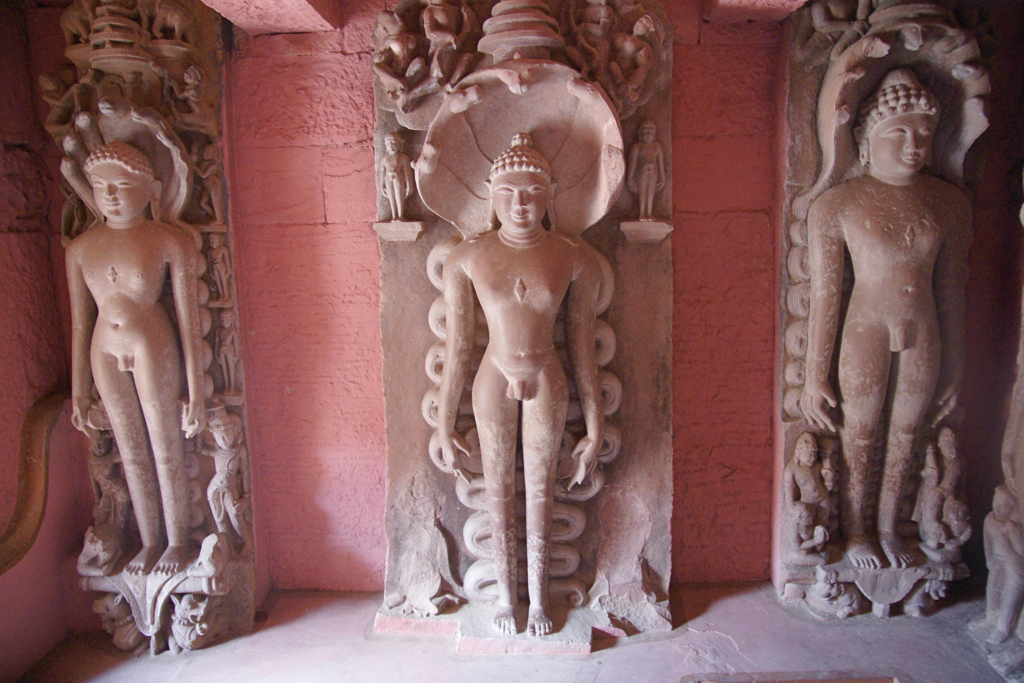
Pārśva & Supārśva

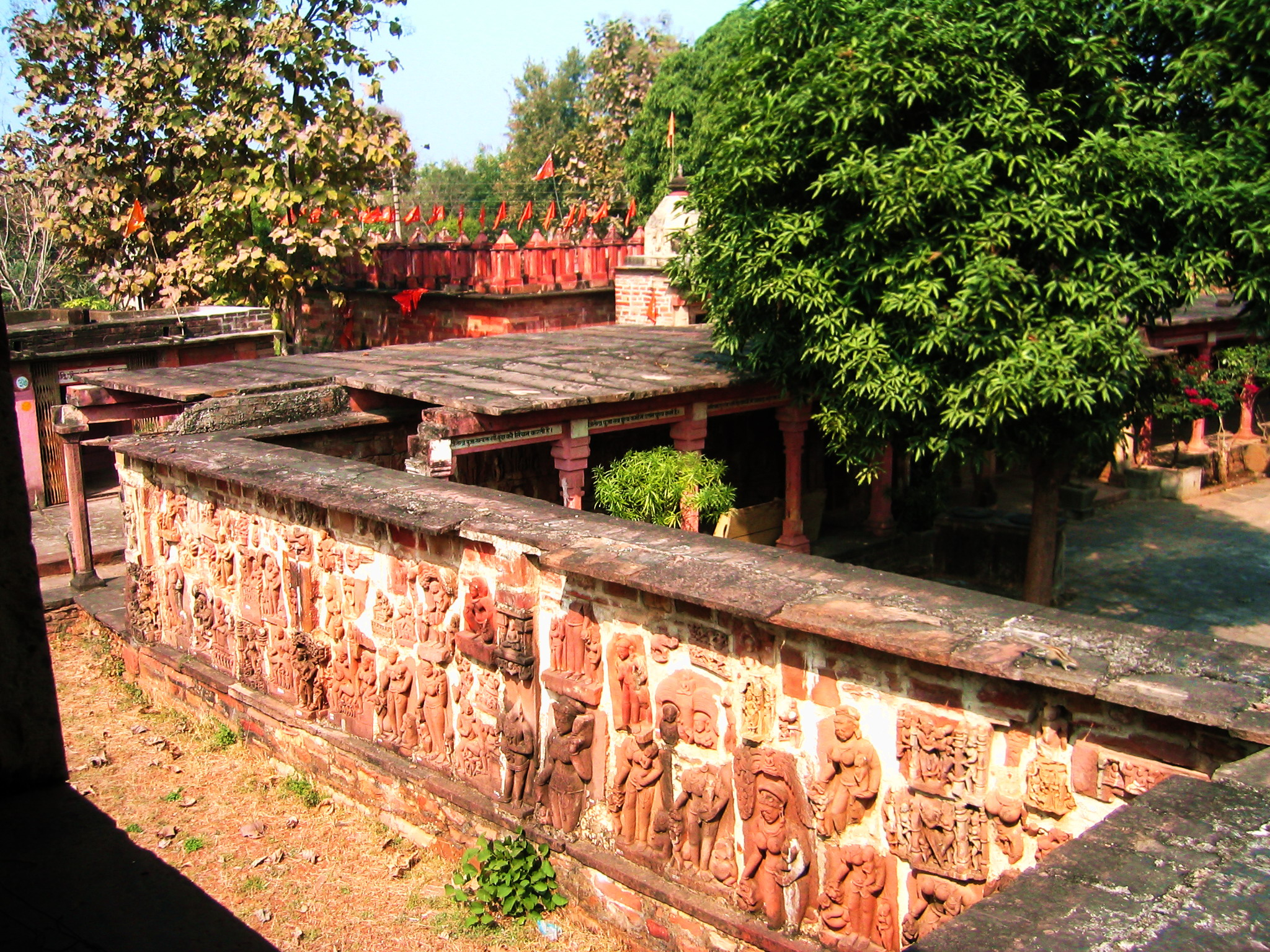
Jain sculpture carvings on wall

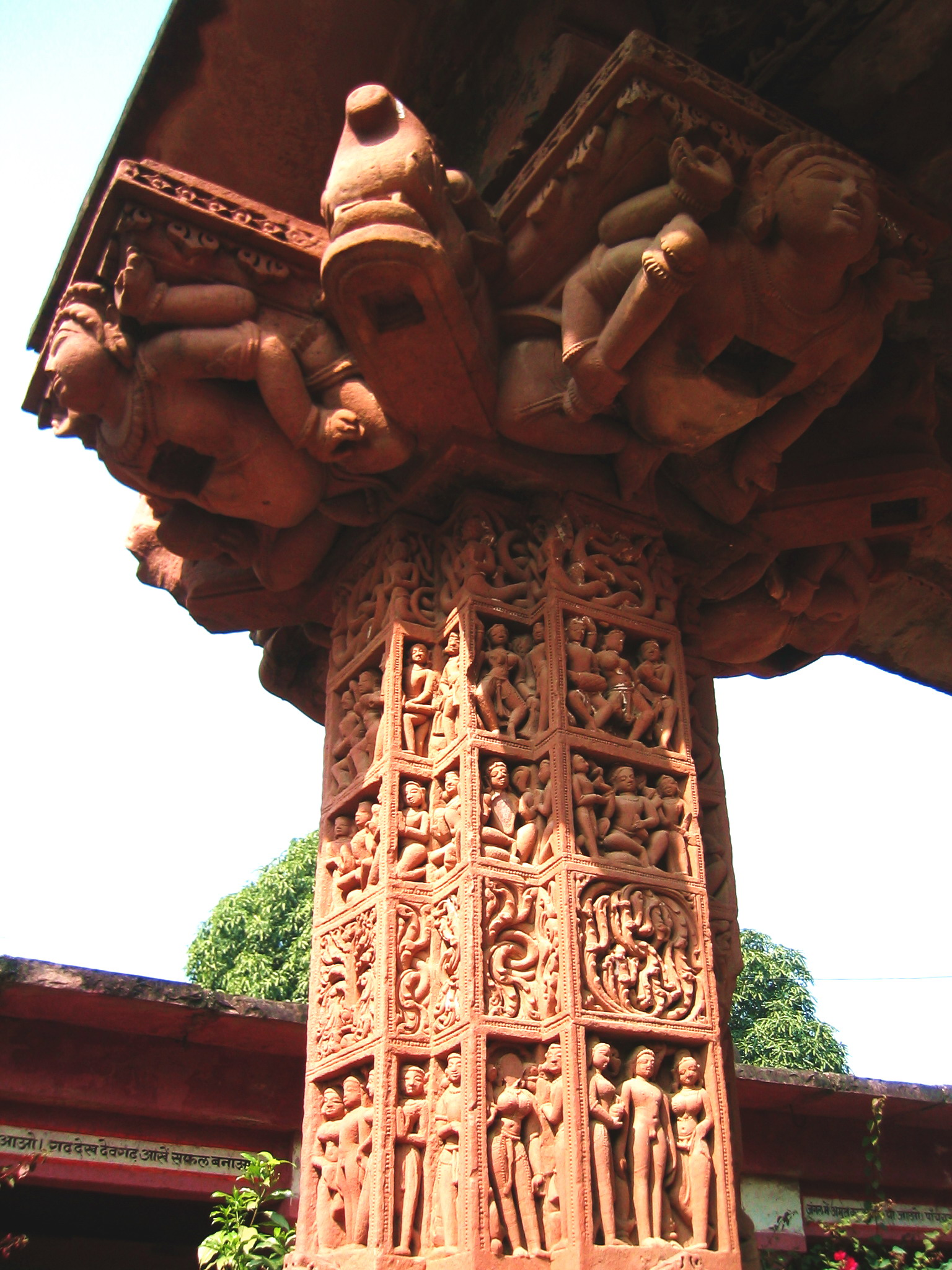
Detailed carving on Pillar

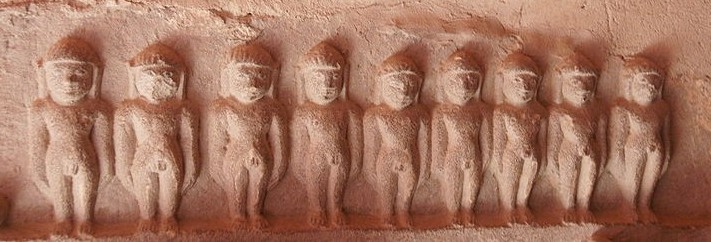
Panel with carvings of Tirthankaras

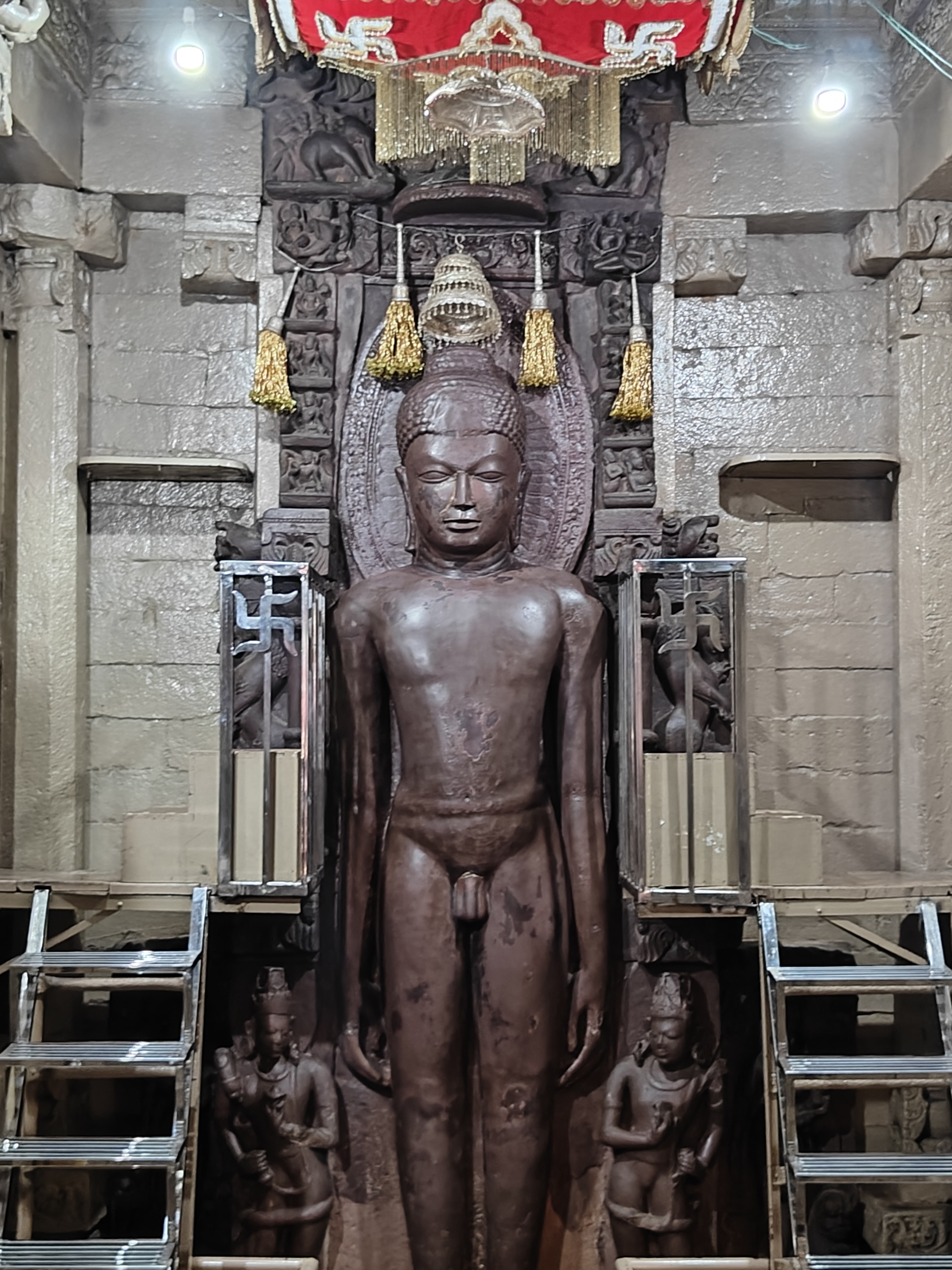
12.3 feet (3.7 m) Shantinatha statue

== See also ==
- Dashavatara Temple, Deogarh
- Jainism in Bundelkhand
- Jainism in Uttar Pradesh
