= Chinese ethnic nationalism =

Chinese ethnic nationalism (中国族群民族主义) may refer to:

- Chinese nationalism#Ethnic nationalism
- Han nationalism (汉民族主义)
  - Han chauvinism (大汉族主义)
- Racial nationalism#China (种族民族主义)

== See also ==
- Hui nationalism
- Local ethnic nationalism
- Multi-ethnic nationalism
- Neo-nationalism#China
