= 1644 historical view =

Chinese historiographical narrative

- Traditional Chinese: 1644史觀
- Simplified Chinese: 1644史观
Transcriptions
Standard Mandarin
- Hanyu Pinyin: 1644 shǐguān
Yue: Cantonese
- Jyutping: 1644 si2 gun1

The 1644 historical view (also known as the 1644 historical perspective) is a historiographical narrative popular on Chinese social media platforms asserting that China's so-called "decline" began not with the Opium Wars of the 1840s, as in the Chinese Communist Party's official "century of humiliation" narrative, but with the Manchu conquest of 1644, which ended the ethnically Han Ming dynasty and installed the Qing dynasty. Popularized in late 2025 by a viral video reinterpreting the classical novel Dream of the Red Chamber as a coded lament for the fallen Ming, the view fed into a broader wave of "overturn Qing and restore Ming" (Chinese: 反清復明) sentiment online, including boycotts of Manchu-associated clothing and attacks on ethnically Manchu celebrities, and overlapped with longstanding "Ming fan" and Han nationalist online communities.

In December 2025, the view drew criticism from the Zhejiang Provincial Committee of the Chinese Communist Party, official state media, and several Chinese commentators, who characterized it variously as "historical nihilism," an internet traffic-driven phenomenon, and an expression of Han chauvinism reflecting broader social and economic anxieties.

== View ==
The 1644 historical view holds that China's decline began not with the Opium Wars of the 1840s, as in the Chinese Communist Party's official "century of humiliation" narrative, but with the Manchu conquest of 1644, which ended the ethnically Han Ming dynasty and installed the Qing. Some online proponents invert the official phrase, terming this longer period of perceived subjugation "three centuries of humiliation". Proponents portray the Ming as a period of prosperity, openness, and technological leadership, and portray the Qing, founded by the Manchu people, as a foreign occupying regime whose closed-door policies and suppression of Han culture set China back relative to the West.

The framing has historical precedent, tracing back to the 1911 Revolution and China's Republican era, when intellectuals searching Ming-Qing history for the causes of the country's backwardness identified the Manchu conquest as the root of national humiliation. Sun Yat-sen, an early leader of the movement to overthrow the Qing, denounced the Manchus in comparable terms as outsiders.

=== Online popularity ===
The present wave began with a video reinterpreting the Qing-era novel Dream of the Red Chamber as a political fable, arguing that its author Cao Xueqin embedded hints mourning the Ming and calling for the Qing's overthrow; the video went viral in the weeks before the topic drew official attention in December 2025. This "hidden meaning" reading spread further online, with commentators recasting the novel's "burying flowers" episode as "burying China" and elevating Cao Xueqin to the status of progenitor of "mourning the Ming" literature.

Alongside this, discussion of "overturn Qing and restore Ming" (Chinese: 反清復明) gained traction on Chinese social media. The trend has coincided with calls to boycott Manchu-associated clothing such as the qipao and magua in favor of traditional Han-style clothing, and with online attacks on the accounts of ethnically Manchu celebrities. It overlaps with two longer-standing niche communities: "Ming fans" (Chinese: 明粉), who idolize the Ming and blame the Qing for China's later decline, and Han ethnic nationalists, who see Han Chinese as disadvantaged by the PRC's ethnic-unity policies. A further, related claim circulating online—that neither the Mongol-founded Yuan nor the Manchu-founded Qing should count as genuinely Chinese dynasties—has recirculated under the saying that "there was no Zhongguo after Yashan, and no Huaxia after the Ming fell". Academic Zhenlin Cui contends that a revived form of anti-Qing sentiment is driven by growing inequality in China, renewed Han nationalism, and a popular association of the Qing with contemporary class elites.

In 2026, the China Film Administration appeared to shelve the release of the feature film The Belief (Chinese: 澎湖海戰) about the 1683 Battle of Penghu during the Qing conquest of Taiwan. Many interpreted the shelving as a desire by the government to avoid sparking discussion and scrutiny of its official Chinese unification narrative, the 1644 historical perspective, and related ideas.

== Chinese government criticism ==
The Chinese Communist Party and Chinese government have criticized the 1644 historical perspective. In a December 2025 article, the propaganda department of the Zhejiang Provincial Committee of the Chinese Communist Party condemned the 1644 view, arguing that it placed too much blame on the Qing dynasty for China's decline when the Ming were also plagued by social and economic problems. It warned that the 1644 view could be used to push "hostile foreign narratives" such as the New Qing History, which places emphasis on the "unique Manchu identity" of the Qing dynasty. After the publication of the article, many anti-Qing comments, videos, and accounts were censored from social media by Chinese authorities.

Xinhua News Agency denounced the trend as a form of "historical nihilism" that distorted facts, attributing its popularity to a "traffic economy" in which platforms reward extreme and controversial content with engagement and advertising revenue. Xinhua called on social media platforms to adjust their recommendation algorithms to limit the spread of divisive material. A news commentator, Liu Bo, described the phenomenon as a form of grassroots Han populist sentiment without institutional or scholarly backing. Xiang Dongliang, an online commentator, characterised the trend as an expression of "Han chauvinism" rooted in suppressed feelings of ethnic pride and historical humiliation. Hu Xijin, a former editor of Global Times, attributed the trend to social frustration during an economic downturn, "mass consumption of history online", and "a contrarian mindset that resists tradition and authority"; arguing that Chinese society needed better mechanisms for absorbing such "negative energy" rather than only promoting "positive energy" narratives.

An article in Social Sciences in China, quoting scholars from the Chinese Academy of Social Sciences, stated that the 1644 historical perspective "threatened ethnic cohesion and national identity, supplied arguments to separatist movements, and could affect territorial integrity."

== See also ==
- Conquest dynasty
- Racism in China
