= Hoklo chauvinism =

Ethnocentric attitudes among ethnic Hoklo within Taiwan

Hoklo chauvinism (Chinese: 福佬沙文主義; pinyin: Fúlǎo shāwén zhǔyì; Pe̍h-ōe-jī: Hok-ló sa-bûn chú-gī) refers to the perspective in Taiwan that asserts the identity, language, and culture of Hoklo Taiwanese as the primary or sole legitimate representation of "Taiwanese" identity. This ideology often overlooks or marginalizes the historical and cultural contributions of other groups, such as Hakka Taiwanese, Waishengren, and Taiwanese Indigenous peoples. Critics argue that this mindset can alienate other ethnic members of Taiwanese society by equating "Taiwanization" solely with "Hokloization". (Note: "Hoklo chauvinism" is sometimes also called "Taiwanese chauvinism" (臺灣沙文主義) or "Taiwanese ethno-nationalism" (臺灣族群民族主義). However, in the broad sense, ethnically Taiwanese includes not only the Hoklo people but also the Hakka people, Taiwanese indigenous peoples, and (partially) the Waishengren, so it is not a complete synonym.)

== Origins and analysis ==
The emergence of Hoklo chauvinists within Taiwanese society may be linked to mass movements in its historical context. Wang Fu-chang, a scholar at the Institute of Sociology of Academia Sinica, noted that in the mid-1980s, the primary function of the mass movements within the political opposition led by the Democratic Progressive Party (DPP)—aimed at countering the Kuomintang (KMT)'s Chinese nationalism—was “to establish and disseminate a set of 'ethnic myths' supporting Taiwanese nationalism.". According to Wang's observation, "the opposition movement sought to shape the identity of 'Taiwanese people' within these mass action contexts; the enemy responsible for the current decline of the Taiwanese nation was the foreign regime, the 'Kuomintang'; only by removing the Kuomintang from power could Taiwanese people restore their national glory. He notes that the context of most mass activities, whether intentionally designed or unintentionally evolved, reinforces this notion. Wang further observes that in language usage, opposition activists typically refer to Hoklo people as "Taiwanese people" and the Republic of China's mainlanders as “Beijingese people." During rallies, when rare speakers failed to deliver speeches in "Taiwanese language" (Taiwanese Hokkien, not the Taiwanese indigenous language) without apologizing to the audience, listeners often pressured them to switch by booing, shouting, causing disturbances, or walking out. The DPP has shaped this distinctive linguistic norm through interactions with the public during multiple mass events. Within the DPP's promoted Taiwanese nationalism discourse, "Taiwanese language," meaning Hokkien, is positioned as the language of the "Taiwanese nation-state." Additionally, these mass events frequently feature extensive use of Hokkien-language songs to amplify the atmosphere.

Tseng Chien-min, a graduate of Kaohsiung Medical University specializing in modern Taiwanese social history, noted that the opposition movement against the Kuomintang underwent a shift in the mid-to-late 1980s: "After the Democratic Progressive Party was established, it gradually leaned toward anti-China activism. Taiwanese language became an implicit measure of loyalty within its ranks, giving rise to the phenomenon of Hoklo chauvinism." Zeng further noted, “Simultaneously, Taiwanese became the most effective tool for mobilizing ethnic politics in Taiwan (whose substance is provincial politics)—a panacea." The DPP member Yang Tzu-chun observed that as party and press restrictions in Taiwan began to ease, "speaking Taiwanese language became a standard for some groups to 'distinguish traitors from loyalists.' Advocates of Taiwan independence would inevitably speak Taiwanese language, and speaking Taiwanese implied a pro-independence stance. In certain opposition circles, not speaking Taiwanese language became grounds for labeling someone a 'traitor to Taiwan.' These specious, ambiguous impressions became ingrained in people's minds following the liberalization of pro-independence advocacy." Hu Tai-li, a descendant of mainland immigrants to Taiwan and an anthropologist who worked at the Institute of Ethnology at Academia Sinica, recalled in her 1997 publication that when she attended gatherings in New York where Hokkien was the primary language of communication, people would whisper behind her back: "Why is that girl here if she can't speak Taiwanese? Could she be a KMT spy?" Hu stated she was "deeply hurt and unable to let it go for a long time." Shelley Rigger, who holds a Ph.D. in government from Harvard University, similarly contends that for Taiwanese indigenous peoples and Taiwanese Hakka communities, the inherent exclusivity and sense of superiority within this ideology "tormented them for centuries."

== See also ==
- Anti-Chinese sentiment
- Han chauvinism
- Han Taiwanese nationalism
- Linguistic discrimination
- Majoritarianism
- Taiwanese indigenous people#Transition to democracy
