= Great Han =

Great Han (大漢) may refer to:

- Chen Han Kingdom
- Greater Han, a school of thought relating to Chinese culture
- Official name of the Southern Han dynasty from 918 to 970.
- Great Han Empire, a name for the Han dynasty
- A state declared during the Nian Rebellion
- Great Han Sichuan Military Government, a regional government established during the 1911 Revolution by Pu Dianzun (蒲殿俊) in Sichuan
- Name of the Korean Empire (大韓)

== See also ==
- Great Han nationalism
