= Chinese racism =

Chinese racism may refer to:

- Racism in China
- Racism by the Han Chinese people, including
  - Han chauvinism, the belief in the superiority of the Han Chinese people and culture to others within the Republic of China and the People's Republic of China
  - Sinocentrism, the belief in the superiority of Han Chinese people and culture to others throughout the world
  - Anti-Qing sentiment, the historical animus against the ruling class of the Qing dynasty
  - Hua–Yi distinction, the historical establishment of a Chinese people by othering those surrounding them (many of these now considered members of the Han people)
- Sinophobia, racism against the Chinese, including
  - Yellow Peril, the late-19th and early-20th century fear of a modernizing China
