= Uyghur nationalism =

Form of nationalism which asserts that Uyghurs are a distinct nation

The Kök Bayraq

Uyghur nationalism (Uyghur: ئۇيغۇر مىللەتچىلىكى) is a nationalist movement which asserts that the Uyghur people, a Turkic-speaking Sunni Muslim group, are a distinct nation. Uyghurs are mostly concentrated in Xinjiang, a province-level autonomous region located in Western China. They are officially recognized by the Chinese government as one of the official 55 ethnic minorities. Uyghur nationalism promotes the cultural unity of Uyghurs, either as an independent group or as a regional group within a larger multi-ethnic Chinese nation.

Uyghur nationalism is linked to the East Turkestan independence movement, also known as the Uyghur independence movement, which seeks to separate Xinjiang from China and establish self-rule as an independent nation. "East Turkestan" and "Uyghurstan" being alternatives names for Xinjiang.

== History ==
While the term "Uyghur" is derived from the 9th century Buddhist Kingdom, the use of the term did not reemerge in great prominence until it was officially recognized as a national category by Sheng Shicai's government in 1936. Ondřej Klimeš identifies four stages of Uyghur nationalism: protonational identity and interest (1900s), emergence of national idea and national agitation (1910s–1920s), politicization of national interest (1930s), and significance of national boundary in flux (1930s and 1940s). Other scholars have similarly identified the origins of Uyghur identity with pre-Modern linguistic and religious identification among the settle people of Altishahr (present-day Xinjiang) under the terms Musulman, yerlik (local), or the offensive chantou (纏頭, wrapped head).

Sheng's categorization of Xinjiang's ethnicities and nationalities laid the framework for modern notions of nationality in the region, with all of his classifications remaining following the PRC's take over of the region (with the exception of Taranchi, a term for settled Turkic people of Uzbekistan who trace there ancestry to the Tarim Basim).

== Facets of Nationalism and Identity ==
=== Ethnic Ancestry ===
The people today called Uyghurs are descended from several groups who have inhabited Central Asia, including speakers of Indo-European, Iranian, and Turko-Mongolian languages. Media reports about Uyghur ancesrtry and Xinjiang archeology often emphasis the discovery of the Tarim mummies, which demonstrated Caucasoid settlement in the region from 2000 BC.

Articulation of ancestral and physical differences between Uyghurs and Han Chinese often emerge when members of the groups draw distinctions between themselves. However, Uyghurs' historical continuity with pre-Qing colonialism of the region has led some to argue that the case for Uyghur indigenous claims is strong.

=== Religion ===
See also: Islam in China and Chinese Buddhism

Since the 10th century conversion of Satuq Bughra Khan, the people who today comprise Uyghurs have been gradually Islamized. Prior to this, the Uyghurs practiced Buddhism, Manicheaism, and shamanism, with these traditions still influential on modern Uyghur Islamic practice, especially shrine pilgrimage.

=== Geography ===
The Uyghur people have formed a strong national identity largely due to their very strong geographic identity. Uyghur identity is closely tied to life in the Taklamakan Desert and the Tarim Basin. The Uyghurs as a people or a nation are held together largely by their distinct lifestyle as sedentary farmers living in several oases scattered across the Taklamakan Desert.

=== Pan-Turkic Influence ===
Many Uyghur intellectuals and activists during the 1930-40s were influenced by Pan-Turkist and Jadidists thoughts on nationality and education. These including Isa Yusuf Alptekin, Muhammad Amin Bughra and Masud Sabri who, to differing degrees, de-emphasized "Uyghur" as a specific national category and promoted larger classifications such as “Turks” or “Turkestanis” (Türk, Türkistanli). Specifically, Masud Sabri also viewed the Hui people as Muslim Han Chinese, distinct from his own people.

During the First East Turkestan Republic, the Turkic nationalist ideology of the Republic led to hostility between different Muslim ethnic groups. The Uyghurs and Kirghiz, who were both Turkic Muslim peoples, fought against the Chinese Muslims of southern Xinjiang and sought to expel them with the Han Chinese. This led several Chinese Muslim Generals like Ma Zhancang, Ma Fuyuan, and Ma Hushan to fight against the Uyghur attempts towards independence.

== East Turkestan independence movement ==
The East Turkestan independence movement, also known as the Xinjiang separatist movement or the Uyghur independence movement, is a political movement that seeks independence for Xinjiang Uyghur Autonomous Region of China. Within the movement, there is widespread support for the region to be renamed, since "Xinjiang" (新疆, meaning new dominion) is perceived by independence activists as a colonial name. "East Turkestan" is the most well-known proposed name.

== See also ==
- Hui pan-nationalism
- Local ethnic nationalism
- Pan-Turkism
- Young Kashgar Party
