= Anti-Han sentiment =

Hostility towards an ethnic group

Anti-Han sentiment refers to fear or dislike of ethnic Han people. Anti-Han sentiment includes hostility towards Han Taiwanese as well as mainland Han Chinese. Since the proportion of Han people in China's ethnic composition is absolute, the anti-Han sentiment is closely related to the anti-Chinese sentiment.

== By region ==
=== Mainland China ===
The anti-Han policies implemented at the political level during the Qing dynasty deepened tensions between the Manchu and Han peoples. By the late 19th century, these tensions had become so acute and widespread that almost every major event in the court was inadvertently linked to the Manchurian-Han conflict issue. The racialization of the Qing dynasty became increasingly evident, leading to growing resentment among Han and other non-Manchurian ethnic groups towards it. The more Manchu relatives distrust Han people, the higher their opposition to Qing; the more Han people's sense of fullness grows, and a series of interactions fundamental denial of Qing rule; it led to the 1911 Revolution.

Since the establishment of the People's Republic of China, anti-Han sentiment within mainland has frequently appeared mainly in western provisions of Tibet and Xinjiang.

=== Southeast Asia ===
Anti-Han sentiment is often seen in some Southeast Asian countries, such as Indonesia and Vietnam, where Taiwanese people as well as mainland Chinese are targeted; anti-Han protests also loot and burn factory buildings owned by Han ethnic descent. Vietnamese workers involved in the 2014 anti-Chinese riots caused damage without distinction between [mainland] "Chinese" and "Taiwanese".

== See also ==
- Anti-Chinese sentiment, Anti-Taiwanese sentiment
- Chankoro
- Han nationalism, Han chauvinism
- Local ethnic nationalism
