= 2014 Vietnam anti-China protests =

Series of anti-China protests in Vietnam

2014 Vietnam anti-China protest
- Part of Hai Yang Shi You 981 standoff and Protests against democratic backsliding
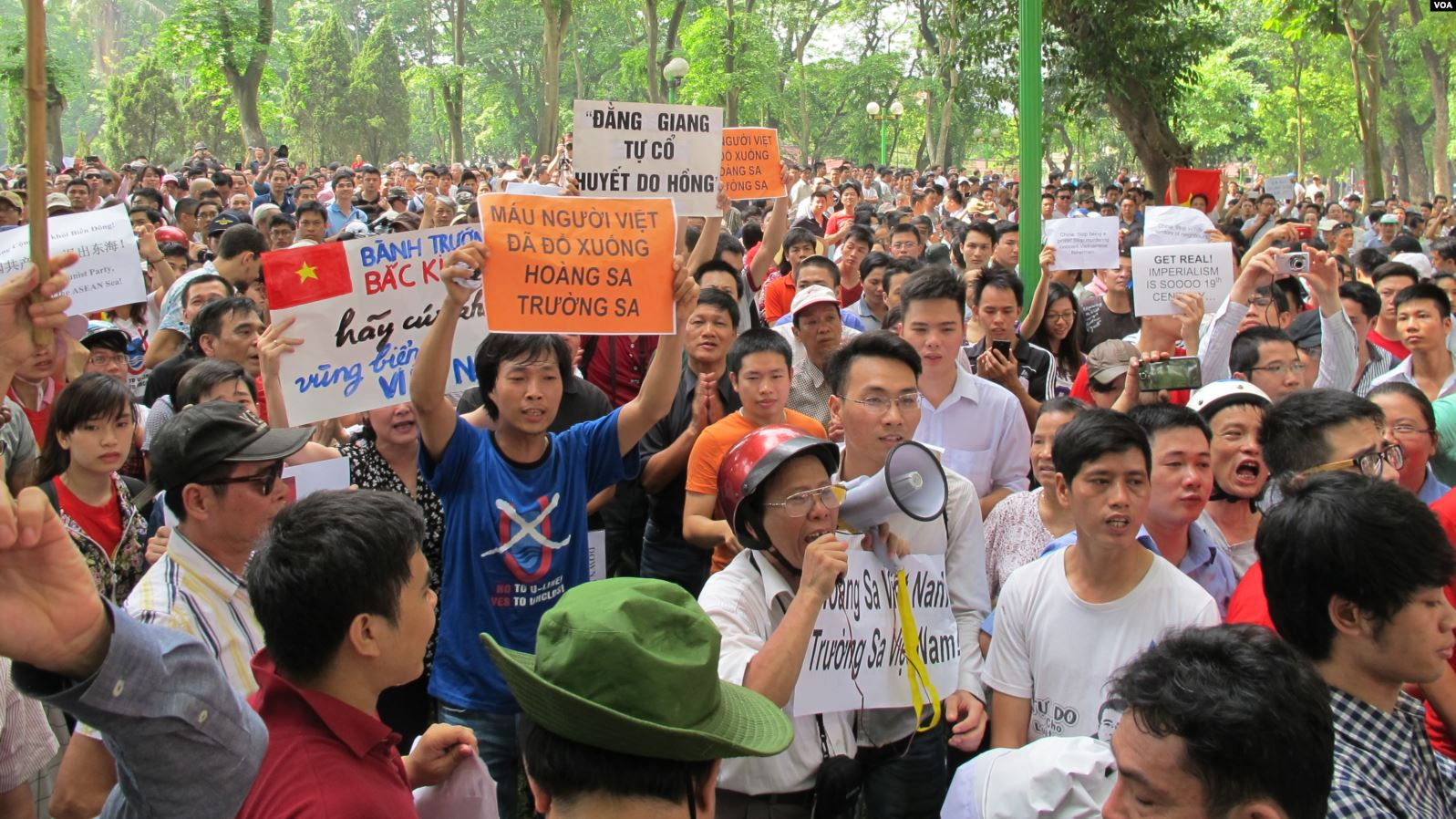
- Vietnamese protesters in Hanoi, 11 May 2014
- Date: 10 May–15 July 2014
- Location: 22 Vietnamese provinces, notably in Bình Dương, Cần Thơ, Đồng Nai, Hà Tĩnh, Hải Phòng, Hà Nội, Hồ Chí Minh, Thái Bình; PRC provinces: Haikou, Sanya and other Chinese cities closer to Vietnam. Overseas in major cities with large Vietnamese communities, including: Australia: Melbourne; Canada: Montreal, Toronto; Italy: Milan, Rome; France: Paris; Germany: Berlin, Frankfurt; Japan: Tokyo; Poland: Warsaw; USA: Los Angeles, Houston, Orange County, San Diego, San Jose, Washington D.C. UK: London; Hong Kong: Hong Kong
- Caused by: China deployed an oil rig in a disputed section between the two countries
- Methods: Worldwide protests, riots in various locations in Vietnam
- Result: China had to withdraw the rig after Typhoon Rammasun

Parties
People in Bình Dương, Cần Thơ, Đồng Nai, Hà Tĩnh, Hải Phòng, Hà Nội, Hồ Chí Minh, Thái Bình; Vietnamese people in the world; Supported by: Government of Vietnam (before 15 May)	Government of Vietnam (after 15 May); Communist Party of Vietnam; Politburo; Ministry of Public Security; Vietnam People's Public Security; Mobile Police Command; People’s Army of Vietnam; Vietnam Militia and Self-Defence Force; Counter-protesters and anti-China protesters	People's Republic of China Republic of China (Taiwan) (Note: Taiwanese president at the time was a member of the Kuomintang, a Chinese nationalist party)

Lead figures
No centralized leader	Nguyễn Tấn Dũng; Trần Đại Quang; Phùng Quang Thanh; Trương Tấn Sang; Nguyễn Phú Trọng	Xi Jinping; Li Keqiang; Ma Ying-jeou

Casualties
- Deaths: 50 confirmed
- Arrested: around 300

2014 Vietnam anti-China protest (Vietnamese: Biểu tình phản đối Trung Quốc tại Việt Nam 2014) was a series of anti-China protests followed by unrest and riots across Vietnam in May 2014, in response to China deploying an oil rig in a disputed region of the South China Sea.

Although the PRC oil rig was used as the rallying event, several of the early organizers are claimed to have stated that they organized the protests to complain about government repression of free speech and government collaboration with China, and that reference to the oil rig as the stated cause of the protests was an attempt to prevent governmental backlash.

In Bình Dương Province, the province most heavily affected by the protests, only 14 of the 351 factories that were damaged, looted, or destroyed were owned by Chinese corporations.

== Timeline ==
- May 11: Anti-China protests started in Hanoi, Da Nang, Can Tho, and Ho Chi Minh City. The size and number of protests were unprecedented as the government took the unusual step of permitting street protests to show its displeasure with Beijing.
- May 12: Workers in a Bình Dương industrial park went on strike to join the anti-China protest.
- May 13: The protests in Bình Dương and Dong Nai escalated into violent riots. The industrial parks and factories with Chinese characters on their signboards were hit in the first wave of attacks. Other foreign plants (including American, German, and South Korean plants) were vandalized by the second and third waves of rioters. Several factories were burned down overnight, their equipment damaged and their stocks looted by rioters. One death was reported in the torching of a Taiwanese-invested bicycle factory. Over a thousand were arrested, with many claiming that they had been manipulated by people who distributed flags and T-shirts and later joined the riot.
- May 14: Riots flared up in the Formosa Steel Mill in Vung Ang, central Hà Tĩnh Province, in response to a rumour of a Vietnamese worker killed there. Casualty reports varied from 2 to 21. At Binh Duong, in fear of a second wave of riot, many workers formed a barricade inside their factories and chanted "Protecting the workplace means protecting Spratly and Paracel island" Chinese nationals began to flee to Cambodia in hundreds to escape the riots.
- May 16: Vietnamese and Filipinos staged a joint protest in Manila.
- May 18: A planned second protest in Hanoi and Saigon, which was called for by several political and dissident groups, was subdued. According to some witnesses, 15 to 20 protesters were seen arrested and thrown into unmarked vans. The government also issued an official statement to urge the populace to express their patriotism in a peaceful manner. Further protests by overseas Vietnamese continued in various locations worldwide, including London, Sydney, Paris, Houston, Hong Kong, and Los Angeles, especially in front of Chinese embassies and consulates. In response to the riot, the Chinese government evacuated around 3,000 Chinese nationals from Vietnam by chartered planes and ships, including 16 injured Chinese workers.
- May 23: A woman died after immolating herself in front of the Independence Palace in Ho Chi Minh City in protest against China.
- May 25: Another wave of protests occurred in various overseas countries including Hong Kong, and Sweden.
- May 26: Thanh Nien newspaper reported that two men had been sentenced to jail by a Vietnamese court for taking part in deadly anti-China rioting. 23-year-old Le Van Nghiem was sentenced to three years in prison for "causing public disorder" and property destruction. 18-year-old Chau Vinh Tuong was sentenced to one year in prison for stealing a computer.
- June 5: The sinking of another Vietnamese ship by Chinese ships was caught on film.
- June 20: A 71-year-old man of Vietnamese descent attempted to set himself on fire at the entrance to the Silver Lake Community in Florida's Manatee County, leaving a note protesting recent China's move. The man later died on June 23.
- July 6: Another pro-Vietnam protest took place in Hong Kong.
- July 16: It was reported by the Xinhua News Agency that China National Petroleum Corporation was moving the disputed Haiyang Shiyou 981 oil rig towards China's Hainan island.

== Binh Duong-Dong Nai riots ==
Both Bình Dương and Đồng Nai provinces are highly industrialized and have a dense concentration of foreign-invested industrial parks. Anti-China demonstrations here quickly developed into a full-scale worker riot, where factories were looted, smashed, or burnt. Swarms of rioters on motorbikes mistakenly targeted South Korean, Taiwanese, Japanese, and Singaporean businesses as Chinese and vandalized them.

== Formosa Ha Tinh Steel Mill riot ==
Formosa Ha Tinh Steel Company and associated port facilities in Vung Ang, Hà Tĩnh Province in central Vietnam, 250 kilometers (155 miles) south of Hanoi, are operated by the Taiwanese conglomerate Formosa Plastics Group, one of the largest foreign investors in Vietnam. The complex employs more than 2,600 foreign workers, among whom more than 1,500 are Chinese nationals. Friction arose between locals and foreign workers, and clashes broke out sporadically. In 2013, a Taiwanese accountant was stabbed to death in one such clash.

On May 11, a 1,000-strong group of workers and locals formed an anti-China parade that turned into a riot. The mob stormed the steel mill, lit fires at the furnace and several buildings, and hunted down the Chinese workers. At least one Chinese worker was killed, and 90 were injured.

== Reactions ==
Initially, Hanoi lauded the "patriotic" displays by its citizens, but reversed their statements after the protests turned into violent riots citing "the country's image being stained as a safe destination for sorely needed foreign investment". After hundreds of people were arrested in the following crackdown the Vietnamese prime minister, Nguyễn Tấn Dũng stated "The Vietnamese government has [...] contained the acts of law infringement and [will] strictly punish violators in accordance with the law As a result, the situation has become totally stable. The enterprises' business and production have come back to normal," he added.

After the sentencing of two men to prison, the Chinese government called for further investigation, strict punishment, and compensation. The Vietnamese government said it would assist riot-hit companies with tax breaks, rent waivers, and lines of credit.

- Taiwan issued a condemnation of the protests by the Vietnamese and denounced them for attacking Taiwanese property.

== Casualties ==
On May 21, the Chinese foreign ministry confirmed that four people were killed and more than 100 others injured in the violence a week before.

=== Hà Tĩnh ===
On May 15, Reuters reported that about 100 people in Hà Tĩnh Province were injured and sent to the hospital due to the violence on the night of the 14th. A doctor told reporters that in central Hà Tĩnh that five Vietnamese workers and 16 other people described as Chinese were killed on Wednesday night in rioting.

Central News Agency (Republic of China) confirmed that clash between Chinese and Vietnamese workers and locals at the Formosa Ha Tinh Steel Mill had resulted in the death of a Chinese worker.

=== Bình Dương ===
On May 15, a dead body was found in a burnt down Taiwanese factory and confirmed as being a Chinese member of the staff.

== See also ==
- Anti-Han sentiment
- China–Vietnam relations
- 2018 Vietnam protests
