= Greater Han =

The Greater Han is a school of thought, "which holds that all the inhabitants of China belong to one (Chinese) family, and that incidental differences of culture, religion and language are unfortunate aberrations, destined to be subsumed in a 'Greater Han' Chinese whole."

== See also ==
- Han nationalism
