= Hai Yang Shi You 981 standoff =

2014 dispute between Vietnam and China

- Part of South China Sea disputes
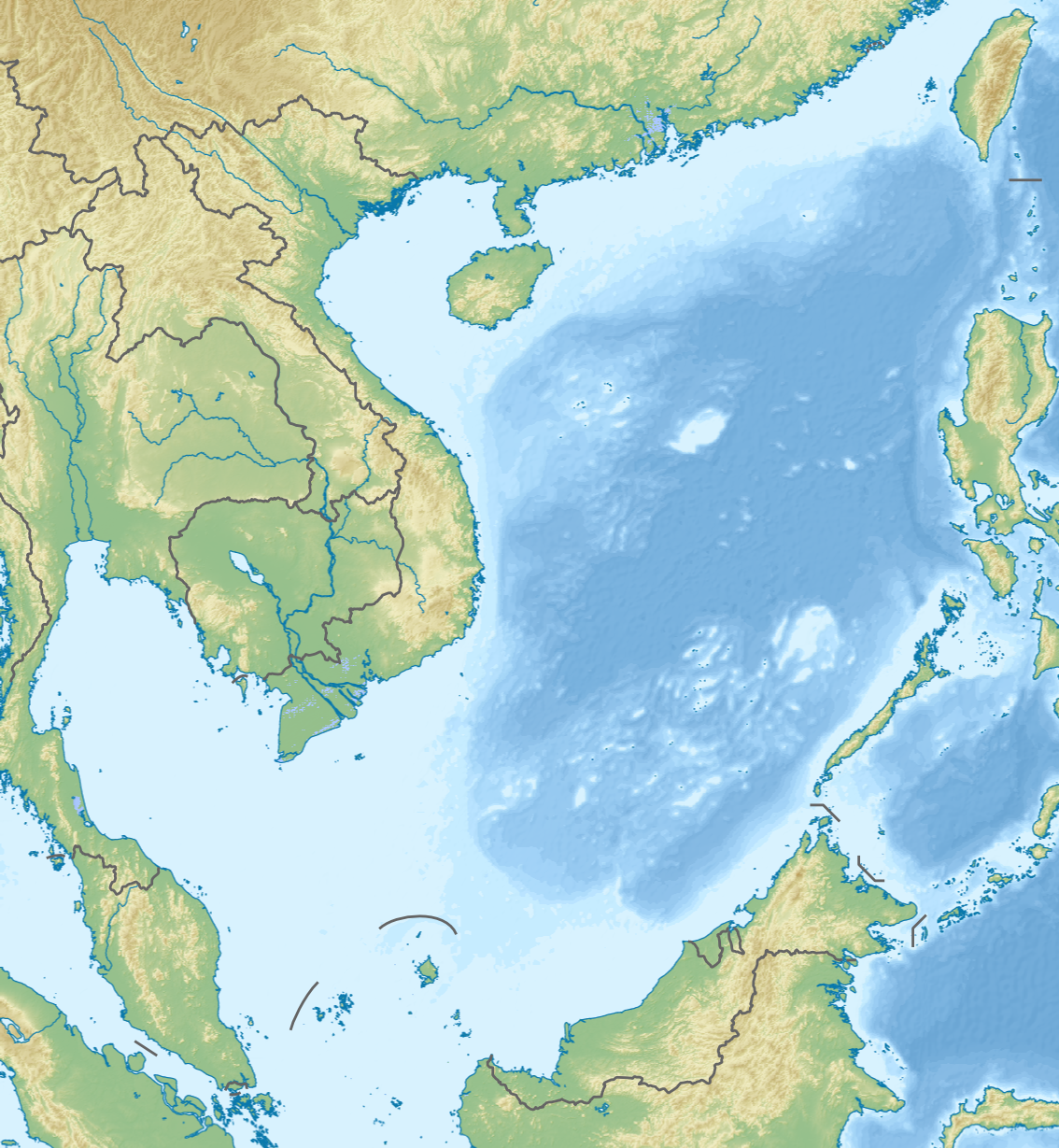
- Rig location of Hai Yang Shi You 981 (position 1 [P1]: date set May 2; position 2 [P2]: date set May 27)
Date	May 1, 2014 – July 16, 2014
Location	Waters near South China Sea, southern region Paracel Islands 15°29′58″N 111°12′01″E
Result	China withdrew the oil rig

Belligerents
China	Vietnam

Units involved
People's Liberation Army Navy; China National Offshore Oil Corporation; China Maritime Safety Administration; China Coast Guard; China Fisheries Law Enforcement Command; Civilian and fishing boats	Vietnam People's Navy (indirect engagement); Vietnam Coast Guard; Vietnam Fisheries Resources Surveillance; Civilian and fishing boats

Strength
1 drilling platform, 6 warships, 40 coast guard vessels, over 30 transport ships and tugboats, 34–40 ironclad fishing boats, Su-27 and Shaanxi Y-8 patrol planes	60 vessels: coast guard, fisheries surveillance and wooden fishing boats

Casualties and losses
None	1 fishing boat sunk

The Hai Yang Shi You 981 standoff, also known as the 2014 China-Vietnam oil rig crisis, refers to the tensions between China and Vietnam arising from the Chinese state-owned China National Offshore Oil Corporation moving its Hai Yang Shi You 981 (known in Vietnam as "Hải Dương – 981") oil platform to waters near the disputed Paracel Islands in South China Sea, and the resulting Vietnamese efforts to prevent the platform from establishing a fixed position. According to an announcement by the Hainan Maritime Safety Administration of China, the drilling work of the Hai Yang Shi You 981 would last from May 2 to August 15, 2014. On July 15, China announced that the platform had completed its work and withdrew it fully one month earlier than originally announced.

The standoff is regarded by analysts as the most serious development in the territorial disputes between the two countries ever since the Johnson South Reef Skirmish in 1988 in which 64 Vietnamese soldiers were killed. It has also triggered an unprecedented wave of anti-China protests in Vietnam and attracted political commentators and scholars to re-evaluate Vietnam's diplomatic, security, and domestic policies towards China.

== Historical origin of conflict ==
Territorial claims in the South China Sea

The Paracel Islands have been a subject of territorial dispute between China, Taiwan and Vietnam in the 20th century. In 1974, China and the US-backed South Vietnam fought the Battle of the Paracel Islands in which China took over the entire archipelago. South Vietnam never relinquished its claims, while Chinese and Soviet-backed North Vietnam (which did not administer the islands) supported the 1958 Declaration by China claiming all of the Paracel Islands, Spratly Islands, Macclesfield Bank and Pratas Island and the Vereker Banks. However, when North Vietnam reunited the country following the Vietnam War it repeated the former South Vietnamese claims.

China claims the sea and land inside the nine-dash line which covers about 80% of the South China Sea as its territory, which includes the Paracel Islands. On the other hand, Vietnam has attributed China's forceful occupation of the Paracel Islands as an illegitimate way to gain possession of the Paracel Islands, and denounced the gross violation of Vietnam's sovereignty by the People's Republic of China. Vietnam's claims to the Paracel Islands stem from their early historical rights, as well as the economic heritage value of the Islands to Vietnam. The Vietnamese have claimed to have had knowledge of the Hoang Sa Islands long before Westerners arrived to the South China Sea and publicised the name of "Paracels" internationally. It has also been scientifically determined that the Vietnamese presence on the Paracel Islands started in the 15th century. The oldest Vietnamese document on national heritage, done sometime between 1630 and 1653 by a scholar named Do Ba, has identified the Paracel Islands, then known as "yellow sand", as a destination frequented by the Vietnamese authorities to obtain big quantities of gold.

Since the normalisation of Sino-Vietnamese relations in 1991, China and Vietnam have improved mechanisms to manage border disputes, which should be seen as a progressive move in the region. However, there is still a lack of agreement on the scope of dispute, which has caused discussions on the Paracel archipelago to be excluded from dispute management talks.

== Background of crisis ==
On May 2, 2014, China National Offshore Oil Corporation moved its $1 billion Hai Yang Shi You 981 oil rig to a location 17 nautical miles from Triton Island, the southwesternmost island of the Paracel Islands. The initial location was about 17 nautical miles off Triton Island (part of the Paracel Islands), 120 nautical miles east of Vietnam's Ly Son Island and 180 nautical miles south of China's Hainan Island, in which the last two nearest undisputed features generate a continental shelf. The oil rig moved several more times, but in general stayed 17 nautical miles south of the Paracels, within the two countries' overlapping exclusive economic zones. Both China and Vietnam make territorial claims to the area. China exercises control over the area.

Vietnam sent 29 ships in an attempt to disrupt the rig's placement and operations. The ships met resistance from Chinese ships escorting the rig, and Vietnam stated that its ships were repeatedly rammed and sprayed with water, resulting in six people being injured, while China stated that its ships were also rammed and it sprayed water in self-defense. On May 26, a Vietnamese fishing boat sank near the oil rig after being rammed by a Chinese vessel; the incident was shown by a video footage from Vietnam a week later.

Internationally, Vietnam attempted to garner support at the ASEAN Summit which took place on May 10–11. Domestically, the tensions with China resulted in people protesting against Chinese actions, which was considered rare in a communist country where the government clamped down on public protests. On May 13 and 14, anti-Chinese protests in Vietnam escalated into riots, where many foreign businesses and Chinese workers were targeted. Businesses owned by foreign investors from China, Taiwan, Singapore, Japan and South Korea were subjected to vandalism and looting due to the confusion by protesters who believed the establishments to be Chinese. However, the scale and extent to which the riots played out have also caused commenters to highlight the contributing factor of growing discontent among Vietnam's rapidly-growing industrial workforce.

== Domestic reaction ==
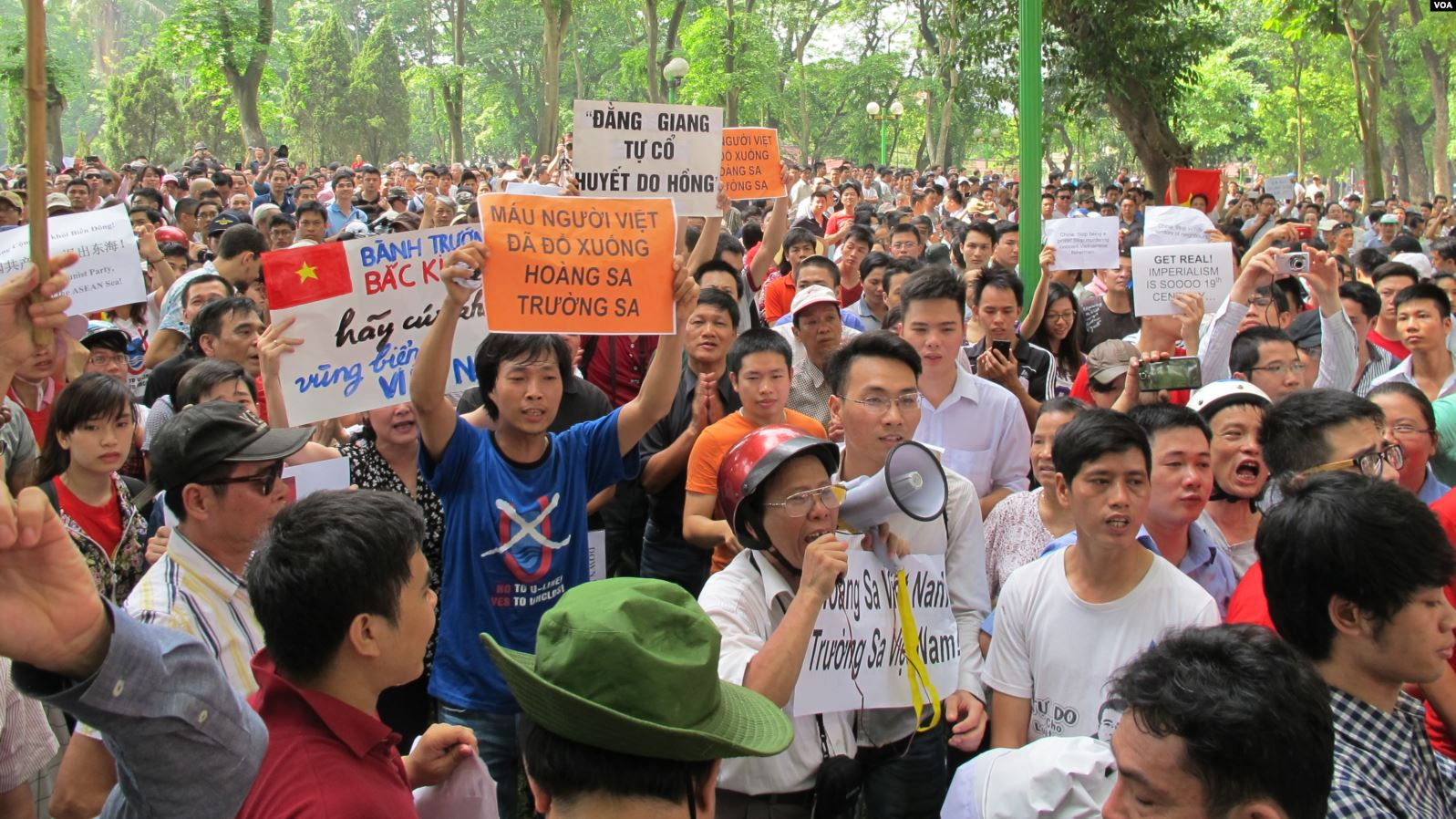
Vietnamese anti-Chinese protests in Hanoi

In Vietnam, anti-China protests and demonstrations followed. The demonstrations were initially peaceful in nature and displayed popular support for the government's tough rhetoric towards China. These demonstrations were seen to embody pro-government nationalism. However, the pro-government nationalism has evolved into anti-government sentiment as peaceful protests escalated into violent riots. Analysts have suggested that the riots, which occurred predominantly in industrial parks and have targeted both Chinese and non-Chinese factories, were influenced by several factors. Beyond anti-China sentiment, the riots were also seen to reflect the growing discontent among Vietnam's rapidly growing industrial workforce, as well as the wider dissatisfaction towards the Vietnamese leadership.

=== Pro-government nationalism ===
The Vietnamese leadership has built its political legitimacy by branding itself as defenders of Vietnam against external threats, and has employed the historical narrative of constant and prolonged animosity in Sino-Vietnamese relations to illustrate the political will and ability of the Communist Party to defend the country. Similarly, the Vietnamese's official response to the oil rig incident was carefully curated to maintain its popular support. In a press briefing on 15 May, Vietnamese Ministry of Affairs spokesman, Le Hai Binh, said that "Vietnam demand China to withdraw the oil rig Haiyang 981 and all of its ships and aircraft from Vietnam's waters and not to repeat similar actions" and that "Vietnam will take all measures in line with international law to protect its legitimate rights and interests". The tough stance taken by the Vietnamese government to oppose China's aggression, in the form of verbal opposition and threat of legal action, was in line with the leadership's commitment to maintain the narrative of its position as defenders of the nation against external threats.

The Vietnamese demonstrations in front of the Chinese Embassy in Hanoi and the Chinese Consulate General in Ho Chi Minh City, which were relatively peaceful and were, therefore, seen as a display of popular support for the government's tough stance towards China. Furthermore, there are suspicions that the Vietnamese leadership has deliberately condoned the demonstrations as public demonstrations of such scale are highly unusual in Vietnam. Officers in plain clothes were reportedly handing out signage and the state television covered the protests extensively. Analysts have suggested that the Vietnamese government's tactful approach to direct negative domestic sentiment against China towards a more positive and effective form of pro-government nationalism which would improve national unity was in the light of Vietnam's sluggish economic performance, which has threatened the communist regime's legitimacy. The South China Sea dispute has, therefore, provided an avenue for the Vietnamese government to divert domestic attention away from its poor governance by portraying itself as a victim of China's malicious ambitions, thereby gaining sympathy from both the international community and its citizens.

=== Anti-China protest ===
However, the peaceful demonstrations escalated into violent riots on May 13. In Bình Dương and Dong Nai, industrial parks and factories with Chinese characters on their signboards were attacked. Rioters burnt down Chinese factories across Vietnam. Following which, other foreign plants belonging to American, German, Taiwan and South Korean companies were also vandalised and attacked, with several factories burnt down overnight. Consequently, other foreign factories in these industrial zones were forced to close, resulting in a significant drop in profits and a decline of investor confidence in Vietnam's international image and the government's ability to ensure domestic stability. Analysts have, therefore, suggested that the anti-China protests were symbolic as they challenged the state's domestic legitimacy by undermining the government's efforts to attract foreign investment and portray Vietnam as a politically safe and stable destination for foreign investors.

In addition, the industrial riots, while triggered by the oil rig incident, were also reflective of the growing discontent and grievances among Vietnam's rapidly growing industrial workforce. Sociological studies on riots have highlighted that the motivation behind riots typically stems from several grievances, and goes far beyond the initial resentment that has sparked the riot. In the case of the industrial riots in Vietnam, anti-China sentiment was also conflated with grievances among Vietnamese workers, who believe that they were exploited and subjected to harsh working conditions imposed by their foreign employers.

Beyond industrial workers, interviews with Vietnamese residents in the wake of the oil rig crisis have reportedly found that the anti-China protests have also encompassed elements of anger and frustration towards the Vietnamese government. Likewise, in the aftermath of the crisis, anti-government frustration intensified. This is due to the public's perception of the state's hypocrisy in its relations with China. Despite the bold rhetoric towards China, the Vietnamese leadership did not take any legal action. Furthermore, there is also a perception that the Vietnamese government is willing to sacrifice the country's territorial sovereignty in exchange for better economic ties with China. These grievances have fueled a growing divide between the Vietnamese state and the general public, further eroding the people's trust and confidence in the government.

After the damage caused by the Vietnamese public, the Vietnamese government pursued a moderate foreign policy with China and sought to improve bilateral relations.

== International reaction ==
- United States: The U.S. Department of State said it was monitoring events in Vietnam closely, and urged restraint from all parties. Secretary of State John Kerry, who is also a former Vietnam Veteran, said the United States is "deeply concerned" that China has placed an oil rig in an area of the South China Sea also claimed by Vietnam, adding that the move was "provocative" and "aggressive".
- Singapore: Ministry of Foreign Affairs Spokesman said Singapore was concerned about recent incidents in the South China Sea and called on parties to be self-restrained and to resolve disputes peacefully.
- European Union: The spokesperson of the High Representative of the Union for Foreign Affairs and Security Policy and Vice-President of the European Commission issued a statement on 8 May expressing the concern of the European Union regarding to recent incidents between China and Vietnam about the Chinese Hai Yang Shi You 981 drilling platform. It mentioned that "unilateral actions could affect the security environment in the region" and urged China and Vietnam to solve disputes in accordance with international law and to maintain freedom of navigation and safety.
- Japan: Foreign Minister Fumio Kishida said on 9 May that he was "deeply worried about" increasing tension in the South China Sea which was due to China's unilateral exploration "in an area of ocean with undefined borders". He believed that China had to make it clear about the basis and the details of its activities to Vietnam as well as other countries.
- India: The Ministry of External Affairs Spokesman stated on 9 May that India was concerned with the standoff in the South China Sea, believed that maintaining peace and prosperity was "vital interest to the international community" and free of navigation should not be hindered.
- Indonesia: Marty Natalegawa, head of Ministry of Foreign Affairs, said on 10 May in Naypyidaw, Myanmar that Indonesia was deeply concerned and "disappointed" with the Chinese government's actions. He also noted, however, that Indonesia still kept its neutral stance on those countries' territorial claims.
- United Kingdom: Hugo Swire, Minister of State for the Foreign Office, stated on 10 May that the United Kingdom supported EU's 8 May statement about the situation in the South China Sea and had raised the issue with the government of China at ministerial level. He urged all the parties to restrain and find methods to cool off tension.
- Australia: The Minister of Department of Foreign Affairs and Trade welcomed the 24th ASEAN Summit's statement about recent developments in the South China Sea and shared the "serious concerns" expressed by ASEAN.
- France: Spokesperson of Ministry of Foreign Affairs and International Development said on 14 May that France concerned with recent events and tension in the South China Sea, called on all the parties to be self-restrained and to solve disputes peacefully and through dialogue.
- Russia: Aleksandr Lukashevich, Spokesman of Ministry of Foreign Affairs, stated on 15 May that the Russian Federation was monitoring the situation and hoped that parties could "solve territorial disputes in the South China Sea through negotiation."
- Canada: John Baird, Foreign Minister of Canada, stated on 19 May that Canada concerned with Sino-Vietnamese rising tension on the South China Sea, particularly by "dangerous conduct at sea and intimidation of vessels and by recent mainland events that have resulted in the vandalization of private property". Canada encouraged all the parties to resolve disputes in conformity with international laws and to avoid escalating tension since these actions could threaten "freedom of navigation, international trade and maritime security".
- Philippines: on 22 May 2014 in Malacañang Palace, Filipino President Benigno Aquino III and Vietnamese Prime Minister Nguyen Tan Dung "shared the deep concerns over the current extremely dangerous situation cause by China's many actions that violate the international law".
- Taiwan (Republic of China): rejected all rival claims to the Paracel islands amidst the standoff, repeating its position that all of the Paracel, Spratly, Zhongsha and Pratas Islands belong to the Republic of China along with "their surrounding waters and respective seabed and subsoil", and that Taiwan views both Vietnam and mainland China's claims as illegitimate, in a statement released by Taiwan's Ministry of Foreign Affairs which added – "There is no doubt that the Republic of China has sovereignty over the archipelagos and waters."

=== Commentaries ===
- The New York Times, in an editorial published on May 9, supported the Vietnamese view and stated that "China's protestations are not convincing". The newspaper called on Vietnam and its neighbors to have a unified response to China's "increasingly aggressive behavior".
- The Asahi Shimbun, one of Japan's largest newspapers, in an editorial published on May 9, called on China to "desist immediately" its oil drilling in the South China Sea, and described China's behavior as "unacceptable". The newspaper supported the Vietnamese view that the "entire area falls within the exclusive economic zone established by Vietnam" and that "China had no right to unilaterally start such an economic undertaking in disputed waters in the first place".
- The Christian Science Monitor, in an editorial published on May 8, related China's action in the South China Sea to Russia's recent actions in Crimea against Ukraine. According to the newspaper, Vietnam and Ukraine "are targets for expansion plans by their big neighbors" because they are not "members in any mutual-defense treaty that binds many of the full-fledged democracies in Europe and Asia". The newspaper called on Vietnam to democratize and to have "the universal rights of freedom and a respect for the dignity of the individual" if it wants to ward off Chinese aggression.
- The Oman Tribune, an influential English-language newspaper in Oman, in an editorial, described China's actions as "flexing its military muscle once again". The newspaper commented that "Beijing is not fooling anybody with its attempt to deflect blame for the tensions on the US."
- The Washington Post, in an editorial published on May 12, said that China's claim is "more tenuous" than Vietnam's claim and called its nine-dash line "audacious". The newspaper concluded, "most likely [China] will continue to act unilaterally in the region until it meets concerted resistance, whether diplomatic or military."
- The Financial Times, in an editorial published on May 13, said that "Beijing clearly bears prime responsibility for this sudden surge of tension" but also called on Vietnam to "be wary of triggering a conflict with China, given Beijing's military strength." The paper called ASEAN's reaction "feeble" and suggested that "all states with claims in the South China Sea should either cease exploration in disputed waters or share the spoils until final decisions about ownership are taken."
- The Pittsburgh Post-Gazette, in an editorial published on May 13, called on the US not to intervene. The paper noted that Vietnam's failure to find support within ASEAN "raises questions about how seriously nations of the region take the threat of Chinese bullying." The paper ended by asking "if nations near China aren't willing to speak with one voice and defend their interests on issues of sovereignty, then why should the United States?" After anti-Chinese riots occurred in Vietnam, the paper reiterated its view in another editorial published on May 16, "[t]he complexity of this Southeast Asian problem, including its internal Vietnamese aspects, should be a caution to the United States to stay out of it.
- The Straits Times, Singapore's largest newspaper, in an editorial published on May 15, called on China to "not ignore the balanced call made at the ASEAN Summit for all parties to refrain from taking actions that would escalate tensions further". The paper wrote, "[t]he reported ramming of Vietnamese patrol ships by Chinese vessels, which turned water cannon on them, is precisely the kind of provocation that could escalate into something far bigger than what the assertive side intends."
- The Jakarta Globe, an English-language Indonesian newspaper, in an editorial published on May 15, wrote "[w]e condemn attacks against Chinese people in Vietnam, and demand the Vietnamese government provide protection to foreign citizens in the country. However, we equally call on China to open a dialogue and stop bullying its smaller neighbors."
- The Yomiuri Shimbun, the newspaper with the highest circulation in Japan and the world, in an editorial published on May 20, said that "China's self-serving acts undermine the stability of Asia and the Pacific region". While noting that "the anti-China protests [in Vietnam] have gone too far", the paper noted that damages on Japanese companies during China's anti-Japanese protests in 2005 and 2012 are still hardly compensated.
- The English-language Bangkok Post, Thailand's oldest newspaper, in an editorial published on May 26, said that the anti-Chinese violence in Vietnam "was all about the insupportable actions of China". The paper said that "Hanoi now must move to clean up this situation, which was largely if not completely of its making" and that "[t]he assaults and arson of the southern Vietnam mob cannot be supported but, in the context of Chinese hassling, it is understandable.
- The Globe and Mail, in an editorial published on May 29, wrote that both China and Vietnam should resolve their conflict through the Permanent Court of Arbitration in The Hague. The paper concluded "As a rising power, China should not feel threatened by an international forum or international law...Beijing has no need to contend for every square kilometre of disputed seawater. The country's future prosperity lies in good relations with its neighbours, growing trade and rising education and living standards among its people. It has nothing to gain from acquiring a few extra square kilometres of ocean or rocks."

== Crisis defused – implications and reflections ==
China defused the crisis on July 15, when the China National Offshore Oil Corporation announced that the platform had completed its work and withdrew it one month earlier than planned. Beijing publicly announced the operation was concluded "in accordance with relevant company's plan" and had "nothing to do with any external factor". Vietnamese leaders have hailed the early withdrawal of the Chinese oil rig as a victory and thanked the international community for its support. The withdrawal of the drilling rig, which was regarded to have defused and ended the crisis, was an outcome that benefited both China and Vietnam. Both countries could claim to have achieved their goals – Vietnam's capability to sustain pressure on China and China's completion of its drilling operation.

=== Uncertainty in the future direction of international relations in Asia ===
The oil rig crisis has called into question the efficacy of dispute management strategies with respect to the South China Sea. Despite the presence of diplomacy and military channels between China and Vietnam to deal with crisis situations, the relatively long duration of the crisis implies that direct bilateral engagement is a limited approach to de-escalate tension. Furthermore, while China withdrew the oil rig one month earlier than its planned date, Beijing's statement on the completion of the drilling operation has suggested that the decision was not a result of effective Sino-Vietnamese engagement.

Furthermore, the political will of ASEAN to address China's increasing aggressiveness in the South China Sea is questioned given ASEAN's lukewarm response to the oil rig crisis and the avoidance of explicitly mentioning China in its statement. That said, China and ASEAN have since engaged in discussions to negotiate the terms of the Code of Conduct in the South China Sea. Speaking at the ASEAN-China Summit on 14 November 2018, Philippine President Duterte reaffirmed ASEAN's commitment to reach an agreement on the Code of Conduct in the disputed South China Sea (COC), and has implied that the Single Draft COC Negotiating Text would be completed by 2019.

Analysts have also suggested that the oil rig crisis has given more clarity to Beijing's aims in the South China Sea. China's increasing military muscle-flexing in the South and East China Seas is seen to undermine the United States' credibility as a security provider in the Asia-Pacific region. China seeks to demonstrate to Asian states that Washington's security commitment to the region is limited as it is unwilling to risk a military clash with China. This will in turn allow China to advance its power and influence in the region. Others have also suggested that as Beijing's increasing aggressiveness in the region is carefully calculated to prevent Southeast Asian states from counterbalancing with the United States. China predicts that as its military power grows and Southeast Asian states become increasingly dependent on China for economic growth, the claimant states will eventually give in to China. Furthermore, China predicts that the Trump administration's pivot away from Asia implies that America is less likely to directly intervene in the South China Sea dispute.

=== Legitimacy of the Vietnamese government ===
In addition, the oil rig crisis has implications on the domestic legitimacy of the Vietnamese government. The Vietnamese government's legitimacy rests on the pillars of economic growth, defending the country from external threats, and building an inclusive society (dân giàu, nước mạnh, dân chủ, công bằng, văn minh). The oil rig crisis has surfaced cracks in the public's confidence towards the Vietnamese government's ability to take a hard line approach in its policy towards China. The anti-China protests and riots were also manifestations of the public's frustration towards their working conditions and the country's sluggish economic growth. This presents a dilemma for the Vietnamese leadership, as it seeks to promote economic growth by further cooperating and engaging with China, while being careful to ensure that economic development does not come at the expense of Vietnam's territorial sovereignty. The nationalistic enthusiasm which the Vietnamese government has fostered to strengthen national unity and party legitimacy has, in turn, made Vietnamese accommodations towards the South China Sea issue politically elusive.

== See also ==
- East China Sea EEZ disputes
- Scarborough Shoal standoff
- Territorial disputes in the South China Sea
- Regional reactions to China's maritime activities in the South China Sea
