= Anti-Qing sentiment =

Historical opposition to the Qing dynasty in China

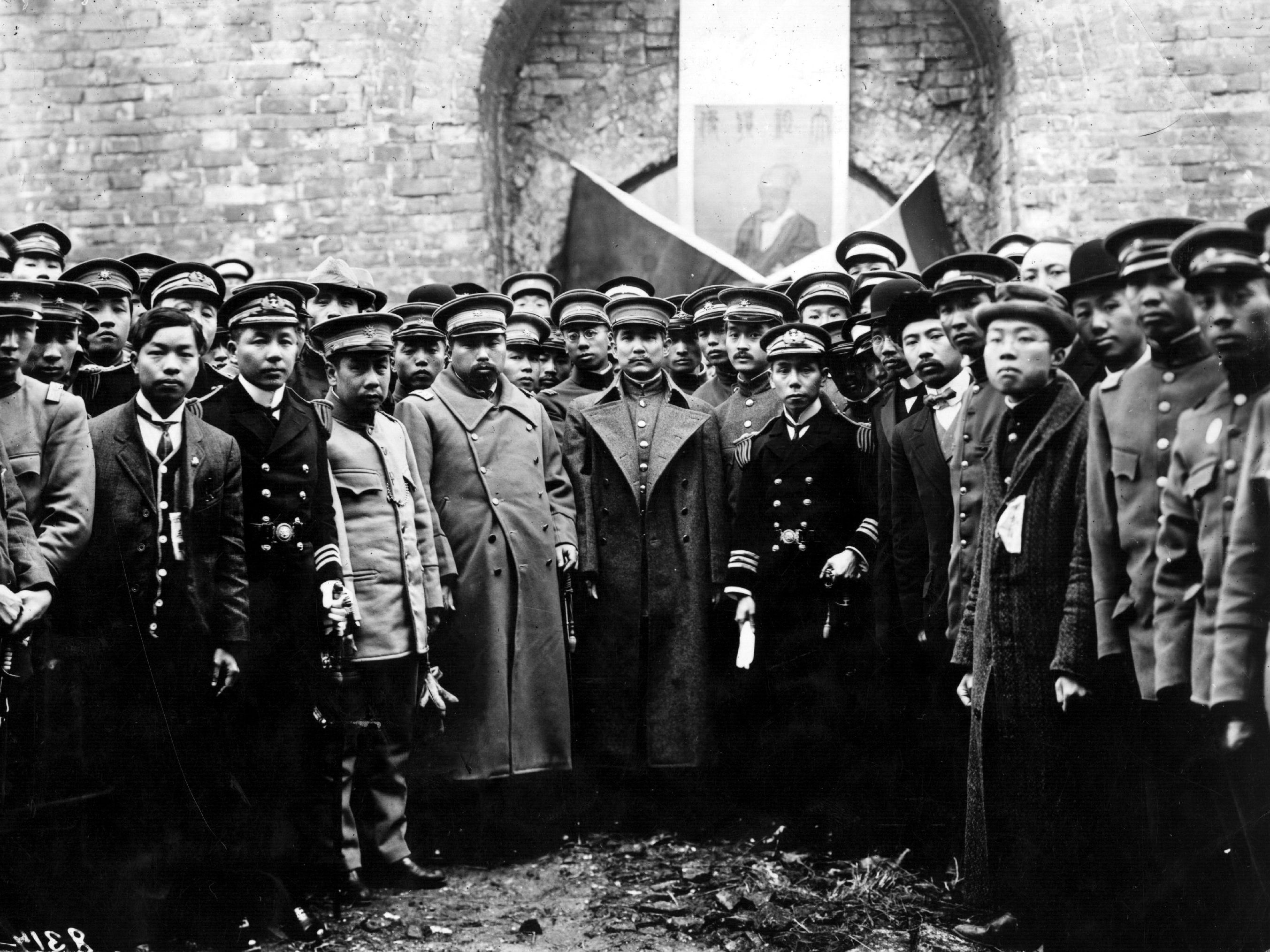
On February 12, 1912, the Qing emperor Xuantong announced his abdication, bringing the Manchu rule to an end. On the morning of February 15, Sun Yat-sen, Provisional President of the Republic of China, led more than two hundred civil and military officials of the Nanjing Government, along with tens of thousands of soldiers, to pay homage at the Xiaoling Mausoleum, the resting place of Hongwu Emperor, proclaiming the restoration of the nation.

Anti-Qing sentiment (simplified Chinese: 反清情绪; traditional Chinese: 反清情緒; pinyin: fǎnqīng qíngxù) refers to a sentiment principally held in China against the rule of the Manchu-led Qing dynasty (1644–1912), which was criticized by opponents as being "barbaric". Already hated by the Han Chinese because of the Manchus' ancestors, the Jurchen people, for the Jin–Song wars and the atrocities against them that followed (notably the Jingkang incident) centuries ago, the Qing was later accused of destroying traditional Han culture by enforcing policies such as forcing Han to wear their hair in a queue in the Manchu style. It was blamed for suppressing Chinese science, causing China to be transformed from the world's premiere power to a poor, backwards nation. The people of the Eight Banners lived off government pensions unlike the general Han civilian population.

The rallying slogan of anti-Qing activists was "Fǎn Qīng Fù Míng" (simplified Chinese: 反清复明; traditional Chinese: 反清復明; lit. "Overturn Qing and restore Ming"), related to the Boxer Rebellion slogan "Revive the Qing and destroy the foreigners" (扶清滅洋; fú qīng miè yáng).

In the broadest sense, an anti-Qing activist was anyone who engaged in anti-Manchu direct action. This included people from many mainstream political movements and uprisings, such as Taiping Rebellion, the Xinhai Revolution, the Revolt of the Three Feudatories, the Revive China Society, the Tongmenghui, the Panthay Rebellion, White Lotus Rebellion, and others.

== Ming loyalism in the early Qing ==
=== Muslim Ming loyalists ===
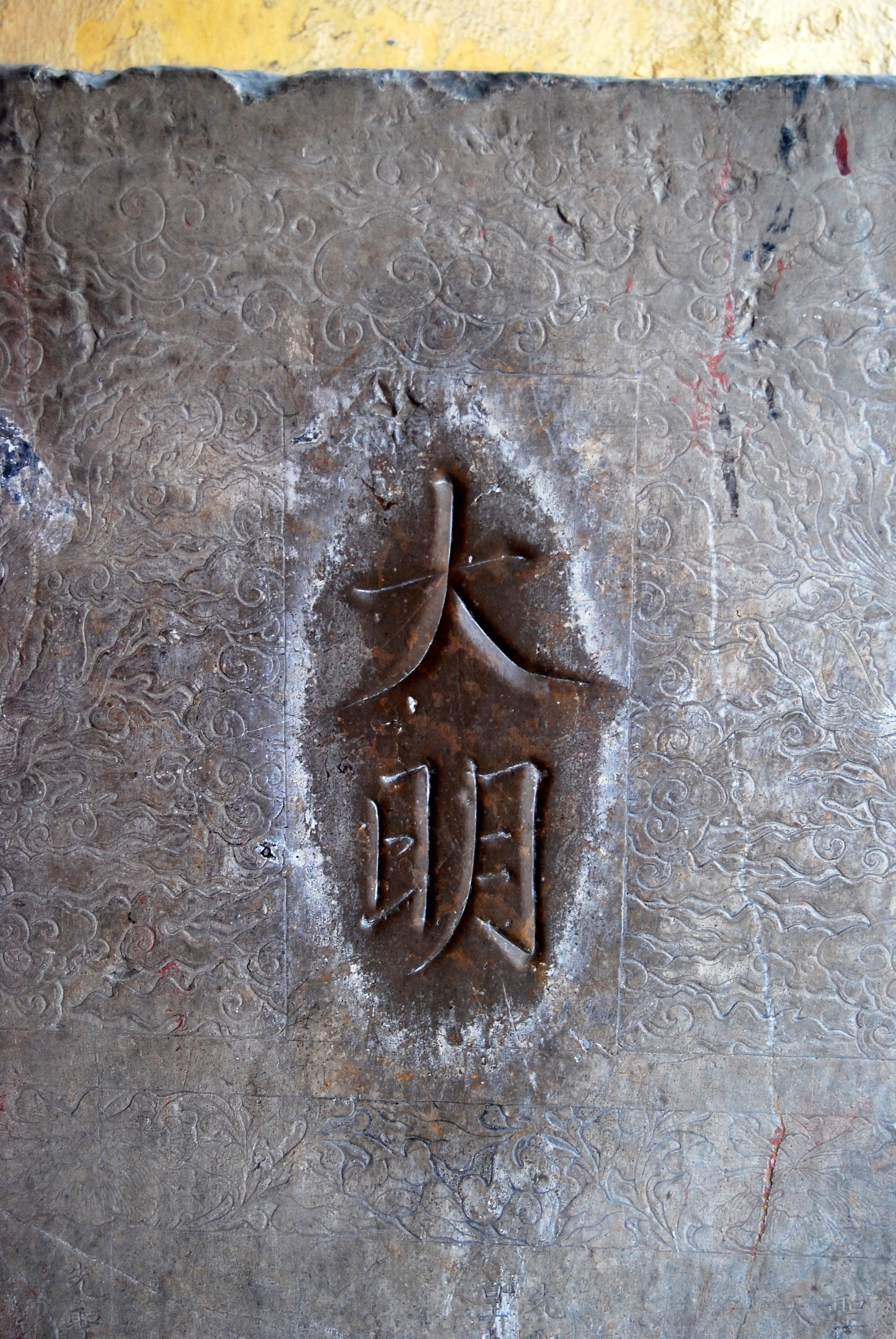
A stele in the Confucius Temple of Qufu, Shandong. The two characters "Great Ming" (大明) have been repeatedly touched and rubbed, polished smooth and bright over time, silently bearing witness to the people’s longing for their lost homeland

Hui Muslim Ming loyalists under Mi Layin and Ding Guodong fought against the Qing to restore a Ming prince to the throne from 1646 to 1650. When the Qing dynasty conquered the capital of the Ming dynasty (1368–1644) in 1644, Muslim Ming loyalists in Gansu led by Muslim leaders Milayin and Ding Guodong led a revolt in 1646 against the Qing during the Milayin rebellion in order to drive the Qing out and restore the Ming Prince of Yanchang Zhu Shichuan to the throne as the emperor. The Muslim Ming loyalists were supported by Hami's Sultan Sa'id Baba and his son Prince Turumtay. The Muslim Ming loyalists were joined by Tibetans and Han Chinese in the revolt. After fierce fighting, and negotiations, a peace agreement was agreed on in 1649, and Milayan and Ding nominally pledged allegiance to the Qing and were given ranks as members of the Qing military. When other Ming loyalists in southern China made a resurgence and the Qing were forced to withdraw their forces from Gansu to fight them, Milayan and Ding once again took up arms and rebelled against the Qing. The Muslim Ming loyalists were then crushed by the Qing with 100,000 of them, including Milayin, Ding Guodong, and Turumtay killed in battle.

The Confucian Hui Muslim scholar Ma Zhu (1640–1710) served with the southern Ming loyalists against the Qing.

=== Koxinga ===
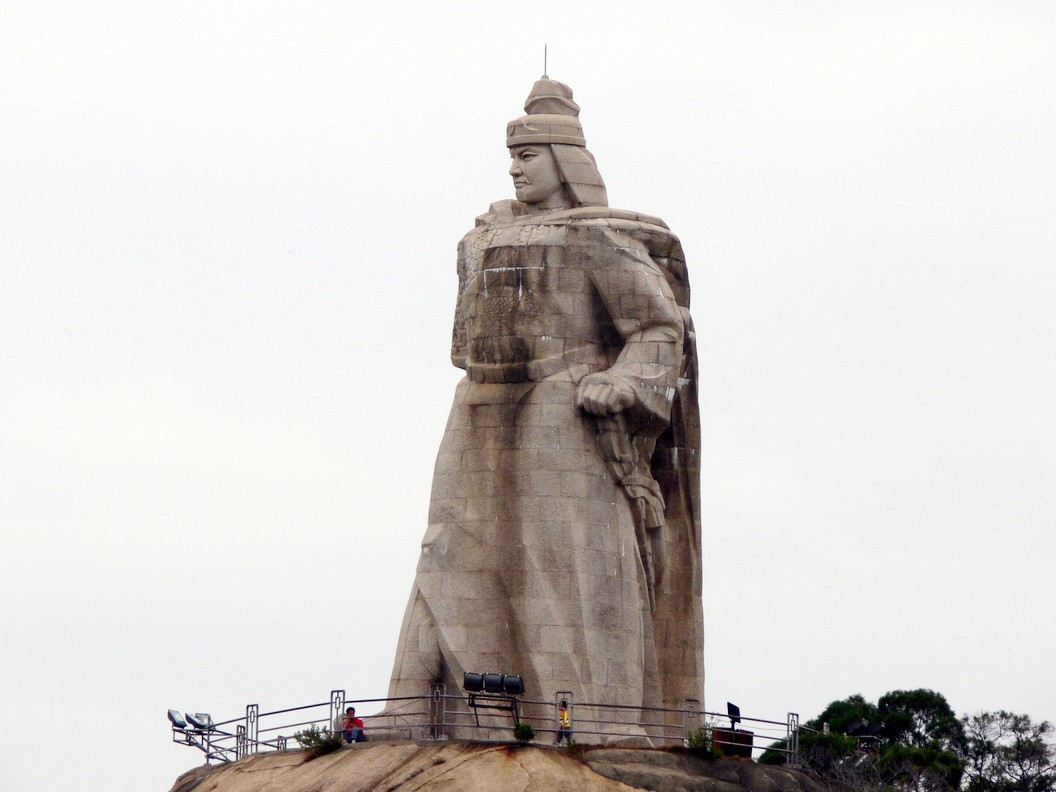
Statue of Zheng Chenggong on Gulangyu Island in Xiamen, Fujian

The Ming loyalist general Zheng Chenggong, better known by his title Koxinga, led a military movement to oppose the Qing dynasty from 1646 to 1662. He established the Kingdom of Tungning on the island of Taiwan.

=== Joseon ===
Joseon Korea operated within the imperial Chinese tributary system and had a strong alliance with the Ming during the Japanese invasions of Korea (1592–98). This put Joseon in a dilemma when both Nurhaci and the Ming requested support. Gwanghaegun of Joseon tried to maintain neutrality, but most of his officials opposed him for not supporting the Ming, a longstanding ally.

In 1623 King Gwanghaegun was deposed and replaced by King Injo (r. 1623–1649), who banished Gwanghaegun's supporters. Reversing his predecessor's foreign policy, the new king decided to support the Ming openly, but a rebellion led by military commander Yi Gwal erupted in 1624 and wrecked Joseon's military defenses in the north. Even after the rebellion had been suppressed, King Injo had to devote military forces to ensure the stability of the capital, leaving fewer soldiers to defend the northern borders.

The Manchus invaded Korea twice, in 1627 and 1636, eventually forcing Joseon to sever its ties with the Ming and instead to become a tributary of the Manchus. However, popular opposition to the Manchus remained in Korea. Joseon continued to use the Ming calendar rather than the Qing calendar, and Koreans continued to wear Ming-style clothing and hairstyles, rather than the Manchu queue. After the fall of the Ming dynasty, Joseon Koreans saw themselves as continuing the traditions of Neo-Confucianism.

== Anti-Qing rebellions ==
=== Mongol Rebellions ===
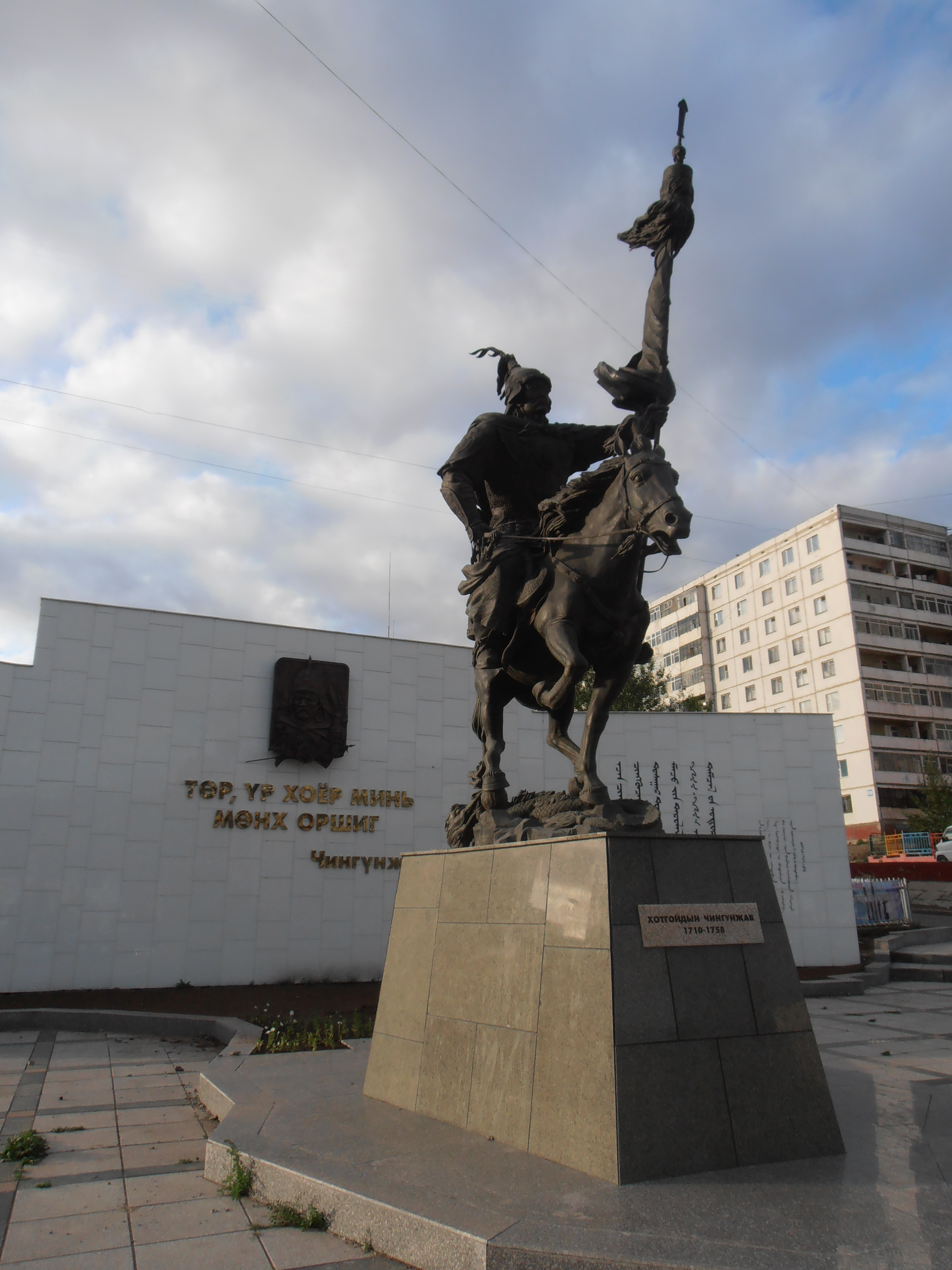
Hotgoid Chingunjav Statue in Ulan-Bator

The Mongols under Qing rule were divided into three primary groups – the Inner Mongols, the Outer Khalkha Mongols, and the Eastern Oirat Mongols.

The Inner Mongolian Chahar Khan Ligdan Khan, a descendant of Genghis Khan, opposed and fought against the Qing until he died of smallpox in 1634. Thereafter, the Inner Mongols under his son Ejei Khan surrendered to the Qing in 1636 and was given the title of Prince (Qin Wang, 親王), and Inner Mongolian nobility became closely tied to the Qing royal family and intermarried with them extensively. Ejei Khan died in 1661 and was succeeded by his brother Abunai. After Abunai showed disaffection with Manchu Qing rule, he was placed under house arrested in 1669 in Shenyang and the Kangxi Emperor gave his title to his son Borni. Abunai then bid his time and then he and his brother Lubuzung revolted against the Qing in 1675 during the Revolt of the Three Feudatories, with 3,000 Chahar Mongol followers joining in on the revolt. The Qing then crushed the rebels in a battle on April 20, 1675, killing Abunai and all his followers. Their title was abolished, all Chahar Mongol royal males were executed even if they were born to Manchu Qing princesses, and all Chahar Mongol royal females were sold into slavery except the Manchu Qing princesses. The Chahar Mongols were then put under the direct control of the Qing Emperor unlike the other Inner Mongol leagues which maintained their autonomy.

The Khalkha Mongols were more reluctant to come under Qing rule, only submitting to the Kangxi Emperor after they came under an invasion from the Dzungar Khanate under its leader Galdan. While the Oirat Khoshut Upper Mongols in Qinghai rebelled against the Qing during the reign of the Yongzheng Emperor but were crushed and defeated. The Oirat Mongol Dzungars in the Dzungar Khanate offered outright resistance and war against the Qing for decades until the Qing annihilated the Dzungars in the Dzungar genocide. Khalkha Mongol rebels under Prince Chingünjav had plotted with the Dzungar leader Amursana and led a rebellion against the Qing at the same time as the Dzungars. The Qing crushed the rebellion and executed Chingünjav and his entire family.

During the Xinhai Revolution, the Outer Khalkha Mongols staged an uprising against the Qing and expelled the Manchu Ambans.

=== Taiping Rebellion ===
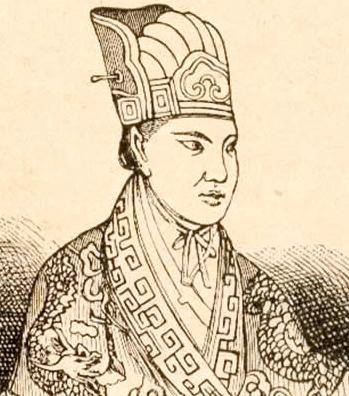
A drawing of Hong Xiuquan as the "Heavenly King" (ca. 1860)

Hong Xiuquan was a Hakka Chinese who was the leader of the Taiping Rebellion (1850–1864) against the Qing dynasty. He proclaimed himself to be the Heavenly King, established the Taiping Heavenly Kingdom and called Jesus Christ his brother.

==== Genocide and extermination of Manchus ====
Driven by their fierce hatred of Manchus, the Taiping launched a massive genocide campaign against the Manchus to exterminate their entire race.

In every area they captured, the Taiping immediately rushed into the Manchu fort in order to kill all the Manchus. One Qing loyalist observed in the province of Hunan of the genocidal massacres committed by Taiping forces against the Manchus and wrote of the "pitiful Manchus", the Manchu men, women and children who were exterminated by the Taiping with their swords. Once Hefei capitulated, the Taiping forces rushed into the Manchu quarter shouting "Kill the demons (Manchus)!" while exterminating all the Manchus living there. Nanking's entire Manchu population was also annihilated.

After conquering Nanjing, Taiping forces stormed the Manchu fort, killing some 40,000 Manchus, which was the city's entire population of Manchus. On 27 October 1853 they crossed the Yellow River in T'sang-chou and massacred about 10,000 Manchus. In Shaoxing 2,000 Manchus were also killed.

=== Red Turban Rebellion (1854–1856) ===
When news reached their ears that the Taipings succeeded in conquered Nanjing, the anti-Manchu Cantonese in the Pearl River Delta saw this as an opportunity and possibility of overthrowing the Manchus to restore Han rule over China, and began the Red Turban Rebellion (1854–1856). These rebels were called 'Red Turbans' because of the red headscarves they wore.

The Red Turban Rebellion was initially quite successful as the rebels gained control of a considerable amount of territory. In July 1854, Foshan was occupied by the rebel. In a desperate attempt to the eradicate any facilities which may support the Red Turbans, the Qing forces burnt the northern suburbs in Guangzhou to prevent it from sheltering the rebels. The rebellion was ultimately defeated in 1856, which was followed by the mass execution of suspected sympathisers and participants of the rebellion.

=== Panthay Rebellion ===
The Panthay Rebellion leader Du Wenxiu declared his intention of overthrowing the Qing and driving the Manchus out of China. The rebellion started after massacres of Hui perpetrated by the Manchu authorities. Du used anti-Manchu rhetoric in his rebellion against the Qing, calling for Han to join the Hui to overthrow the Manchu Qing after 200 years of their rule. Du invited the fellow Hui Muslim leader Ma Rulong to join him in driving the Manchu Qing out and "recover China". For his war against Manchu "oppression", Du "became a Muslim hero", while Ma Rulong defected to the Qing. On multiple occasions Kunming was attacked and sacked by Du Wenxiu's forces. His capital was Dali. The revolt ended in 1873. Du Wenxiu is regarded as a hero by the present day government of China.

=== Tibetan rebellions ===
Tibetan Buddhist Lamas rebelled against the Qing at Batang during the 1905 Tibetan Rebellion, assassinating the Manchu leader Fengquan, and also killing French Catholic missionaries and Tibetan converts to Catholicism.

== Overthrow of the Qing ==
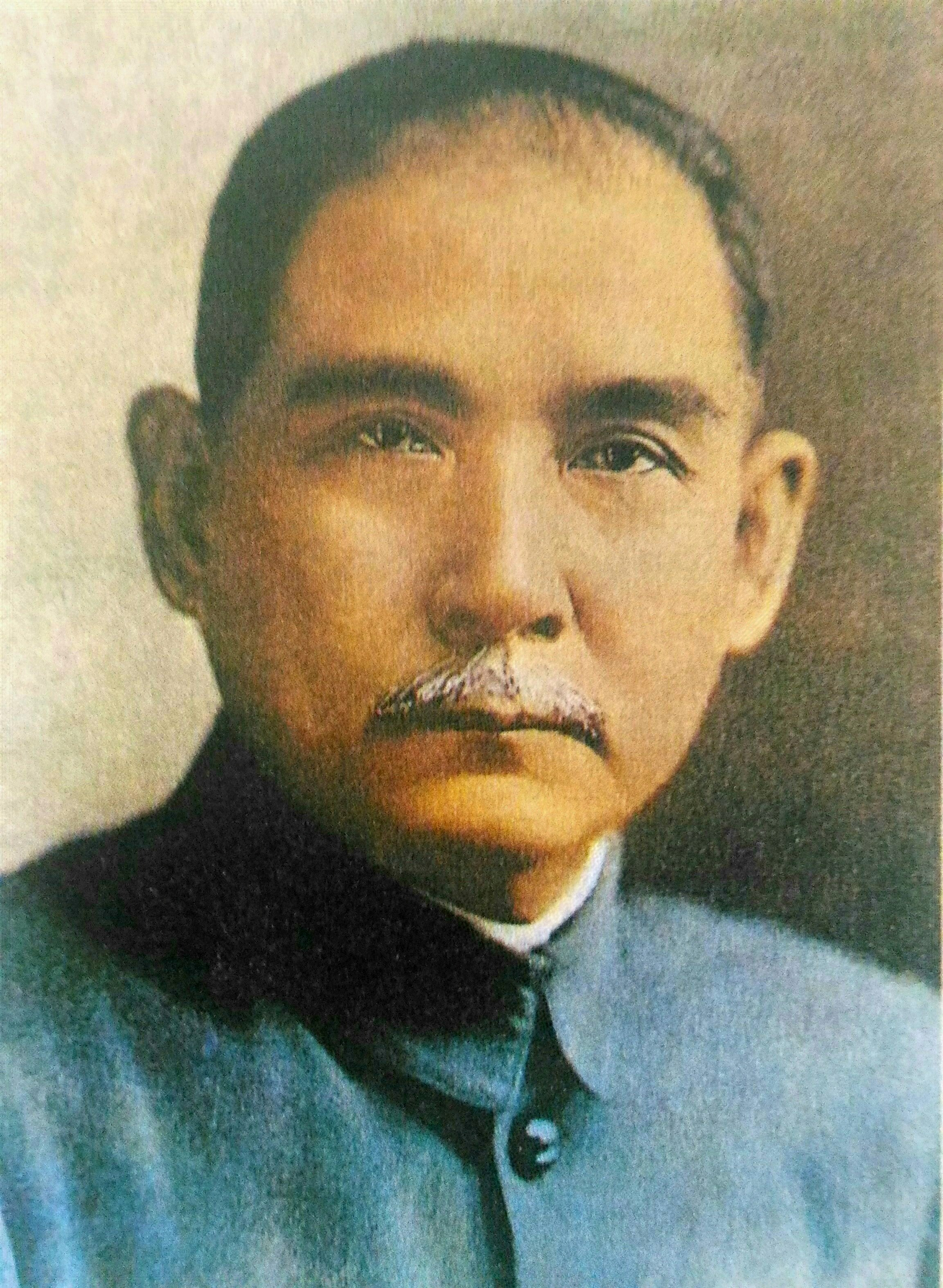
Sun Yat-sen, one of leaders of the 1911 Revolution and founding fathers of the Republic of China

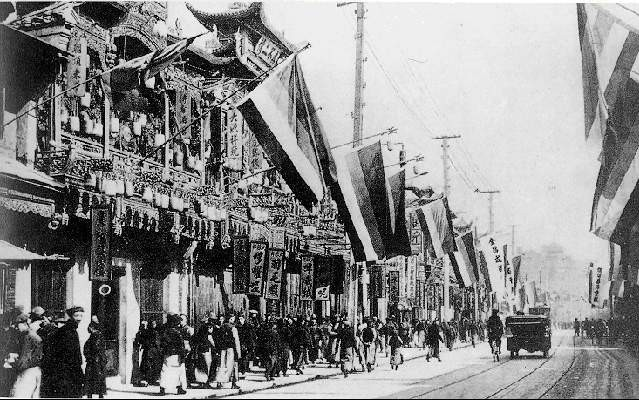
Celebrations in Nanjing Road, Shanghai during the Xinhai Revolution, 1911

The Xinhai Revolution of 1911 was catalysed by the triumph of the Wuchang Uprising, when the victorious Wuchang revolutionaries telegraphed the other provinces asking them to declare their independence, and 15 provinces in Southern China and Central China did so.

Xinhai revolutionaries launched mass massacres against the Manchus across Chinese cities. These notorious massacres include the mass killing of approximately 10,000 Manchus in Wuhan and the massacre of approximately 20,000 Manchus in Xi'an. The Hui Muslim community was divided in its support for the 1911 Xinhai Revolution. The Hui Muslims of Shaanxi supported the revolutionaries and the Hui Muslims of Gansu supported the Qing. The native Hui Muslims (Mohammedans) of Xi'an (Shaanxi province) joined the Han Chinese revolutionaries in slaughtering the entire 20,000 Manchu population of Xi'an. The native Hui Muslims of Gansu province led by general Ma Anliang sided with the Qing and prepared to attack the anti-Qing revolutionaries of Xi'an city. Only a few wealthy Manchus were held for ransom and some Manchu females survived. Wealthy Han Chinese seized Manchu girls to become their slaves and poor Han Chinese troops seized young Manchu women to be their wives. Young Manchu girls were also seized by Hui Muslims of Xi'an during the massacre and brought up as Muslims.

On 29 December 1911, Sun Yat-Sen was sworn in as the first president of China. The Republic of China was proclaimed on 1 January 1912, and on 12 February 1912, the emperor of China, 6-year-old Puyi, and Empress Dowager Longyu signed an edict of abdication, ending 268 years of Qing rule and almost 2,000 years of dynastic rule in China. Incentives for Manchu nobles were discontinued by the government in 1924.

Texts which contained anti-Manchu content were banned by President Yuan Shikai during Republican rule. However, anti-Manchu sentiment is on the rise again under the People's Republic of China, as many Han Chinese nationalists think that the state treats minorities favorably, or that many parts of Chinese culture were destroyed by the Manchu.

== 21st century ==
In the 21st century, anti-Qing sentiment on Chinese social media is frequently related to the "1644 historical view." In 2025, Chinese Communist Party authorities in Zhejiang warned that anti-Qing sentiment risks creating an opening for so-called "hostile foreign forces" to promote New Qing History. Anti-Qing sentiment may also raise questions about the current territorial boundaries of China, including Tibet, Xinjiang, Inner Mongolia and Taiwan, which were the products of Qing expansion. Academic Zhenlin Cui contends that a revived form of anti-Qing sentiment is driven by growing inequality in China, renewed Han nationalism, and a popular association of the Qing with contemporary class elites.

== See also ==
- Anti-Chinese sentiment
- Anti-Han sentiment
- Racism in China
  - Han nationalism, Han chauvinism
- Timeline of late anti-Qing rebellions
- Conquest dynasty
- Gu Yanwu
- Wang Fuzhi
- Sonnō jōi

== Sources ==
- Ebrey, Patricia Buckley; Walthall, Ann; Palais, James B. (2006). East Asia: A Cultural, Social, and Political History. Boston and New York: Houghton Mifflin Press. ISBN 978-0-618-13384-0.
- Holcombe, Charles (2011). A History of East Asia: From the Origins of Civilization to the Twenty-First Century. Cambridge University Press. ISBN 978-0-521-51595-5.
