= Voices of Orchid Island =

Taiwanese documentary directed by HU Tai-li

Voices of Orchid Island is a Taiwanese documentary directed by Hu Tai-li. The film records the perspectives of the Yami people (now known as the Tao) living in Orchid Island regarding tourism development, modern healthcare, and the establishment of a nuclear waste storage site on the island.

== Synopsis ==
As a Han anthropologist, Hu collaborated with the Bunun doctor Tien Jacob, enlisted the help of two anti-nuclear young Tao people, Si Nuzai (施努來) and Kuo Chien-ping (郭健平), to complete this work. In the first part, the film explores the traditional beliefs of the Tao people regarding their fear of photography technology and their disdain for becoming subjects of Taiwanese tourists. The tourists often belittle the traditional loincloth as a symbol of backwardness.

In the second part, the film reveals the gap between modern medical and traditional beliefs. Although there is a health center on the island, medical resources remain inadequate. Because the tribe believes that diseases originate from the intrusion of evil spirits (anito), or they consider the economic burden of transportation costs for off-island treatment, Tao people are reluctant to seek medical care. This makes it difficult to promote medical practices locally. The film also documents how the tribe conducts rituals to exorcise evil spirits.

The final part is about the nuclear issue. Since 1970, the Taiwan Power Company has established a nuclear waste storage site on the island for burying nuclear waste. The anti-nuclear youth on the island struggled because many residents pursued education and employment in Taiwan, leading to a loss of land identity and cultural connection with Orchid Island. Their advocacy faced challenges in gaining resonance.

== Awards and Festivals ==
References

- 1993 Golden Horse Awards - Best Documentary Film
- 1994 Chicago International Film Festival - Silver Plaque Award for documentary film, arts/humanities category
- 1994 Bilan du Film Ethnographique, France
- 1994 Göttingen International Ethnographic Film Festival
- 1995 Margaret Mead Film Festival
- 2014 Asian Women's Film Festival, India
