= Hai Yang Shi You 981 =

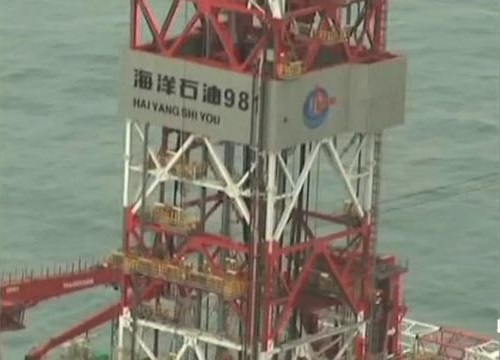

History
- Name: Hai Yang Shi You 981
- Owner: China National Offshore Oil Corporation
- Operator: China National Offshore Oil Corporation
- Builder: Shanghai Waigaoqiao Shipbuilding Co., Ltd
- Cost: 6 billion renminbi
- Launched: 26 February 2010
- Maiden voyage: 26 May 2011
- Identification: IMO number: 9480344; MMSI number: 413464330; Callsign: BYDG
- Status: in active service

General characteristics
- Displacement: 30,670 tons
- Length: 114 metres
- Beam: 90 metres
- Speed: 8 knots
- Crew: 160

Hai Yang Shi You 981 (Chinese: 海洋石油981; pinyin: Hǎiyáng shíyóu 981, also known as Ocean Oil 981, Ocean Petroleum 981, HD-981) is a semi-submersible oil platform owned and operated by the China National Offshore Oil Corporation. The semi-sub Hai Yang Shi You 981 is equipped with Liebherr Cranes and Aker (AKMH) draw works complete with top drive. The rig designed by Friede & Goldman.

The rig began operation on May 9, 2012, in the South China Sea, 320 km southeast of Hong Kong, at a depth of 1,500 m. On May 2, 2014, the platform was moved near to the Paracel Islands, a move Vietnam stated violated their territorial claims while Chinese officials said was legal as it falls within surrounding waters of the Paracel Islands which China militarily controls.

Since the dominion of its location is claimed by both China and Vietnam, this raised a storm of protest in Vietnam.

== See also ==
- Hai Yang Shi You 981 standoff
- 2014 Vietnam anti-China protests
