= Hostile foreign forces =

Chinese Communist Party term

Hostile foreign forces (Note: Variously called foreign anti-China forces (境外反华势力), foreign forces (境外势力), international anti-China forces (国际反华势力), Western anti-China forces (西方反华势力) or Western hostile forces (西方敌对势力)) (Chinese: 境外敌对势力; pinyin: Jìngwài Díduì Shìlì) is a term used by Chinese Communist Party (CCP) leadership to refer to external threats to the political system of the People's Republic of China. The term has also used in Taiwan with the 2019 Anti-Infiltration Act to refer to the CCP and the government of the People's Republic of China.

== History ==
The earliest use of the term was on 6 December 1948, when the People's Daily translated an article from a Russian writer commemorating the 10th anniversary of Joseph Stalin's History of the Communist Party of the Soviet Union (Bolsheviks), which used the term "hostile class forces" (阶级敌对势力). In the 1950s, all references to this term in People's Daily and other state media came from this origin. In his essay titled On the Correct Handling of Contradictions Among the People in 1957, Mao Zedong spoke repeatedly about the "hostile class" (敌对阶级), arguing it was necessary to "clearly distinguish between ourselves and the enemy, and between right and wrong". In this view, "hostile forces" (敌对势力) referred to those that outside the definition of "the people" (人民). During the Cultural Revolution, "hostile forces" referred to the internal enemies of the CCP, opponents of Mao, as well as those who were against socialism around the world.

During the period of reform and opening up, the term was used by CCP hardliners to warn against the destabilization of the political system. Top CCP leader Hu Qiaomu wrote in People's Daily on 6 October 1978: "The socialist society, as a nascent system, has not yet been consolidated, and we must devote considerable power in dealing with hostile forces at home and abroad." He continued by saying, "the hostile forces opposing the Party and opposing socialism could possibly appear behind the mask of the right, or behind the mask of the left." The term was particularly used in the aftermath of the 1989 Tiananmen square protests and massacre. On 4 June 1990, on the first anniversary of the protests, People's Daily wrote regarding the protests: "The purpose of the hostile forces at home and abroad in manufacturing this storm was to overthrow the leadership of the CCP, to subvert the socialist system, and turn China into a vassal of the capitalist developed countries". It was also used after the persecution of Falun Gong in 1999. People's Daily wrote on 26 July 1990 that "the emergence and spread of Falun Gong is a political struggle for the masses and for [political] position between hostile forces at home and abroad and our Party".

== Usage in mainland China ==
The term has frequently been used by Chinese state media and Chinese authorities to raise allegations of foreign interference, including towards the protest movements in Hong Kong. It has also been used to describe the United States and its allies. The term has also been used by nationalist accounts on social media against liberal domestic media, social organizations and individuals. Regarding "hostile forces", the Office of the National Security Commission notes in 2022:

Hostile forces inside and outside our borders have never abandoned their subversive intent to Westernize and divide our state. They do not rest, not even for a moment... This is a real and present danger to the security of our sovereign power.

The Counterespionage Law of the People's Republic of China that passed in 2014 describes "hostile organizations" (敌对组织) as "organizations that are hostile to the people's democratic dictatorship and the socialist system of the People's Republic of China and endanger national security" as determined by the Ministry of Public Security and the Ministry of State Security (MSS).

In 2025, the Hong Kong Office for Safeguarding National Security used the term in the context of foreign journalists reporting on the Wang Fuk Court fire. In 2025, the Zhejiang Provincial Committee of the Chinese Communist Party warned that anti-Qing sentiment, particularly the 1644 historical view, on Chinese social media risks creating an opening for hostile foreign forces to promote New Qing History. In April 2026, the MSS blamed hostile foreign forces for spreading the "lying flat" mindset among young people.

== Usage in Taiwan ==
In Taiwan, foreign hostile forces are defined in the 2019 Anti-Infiltration Act as countries or political entities at war or engaging in a military standoff with Taiwan. The law bars people from accepting money or acting on instructions from foreign hostile forces to lobby for political causes, make political donations, or disrupt assemblies, social order, elections, and referendums. In March 2025, Taiwanese President Lai Ching-te described the People's Republic of China as a foreign hostile force.

== See also ==
- Outside agitator
- Third Force (South Africa)
- Fifth column
- Peaceful Evolution theory
- Colour revolution
- United States foreign adversaries
