= Hu Tai-li =

Taiwanese anthropologist (1950–2022)

- 胡台麗
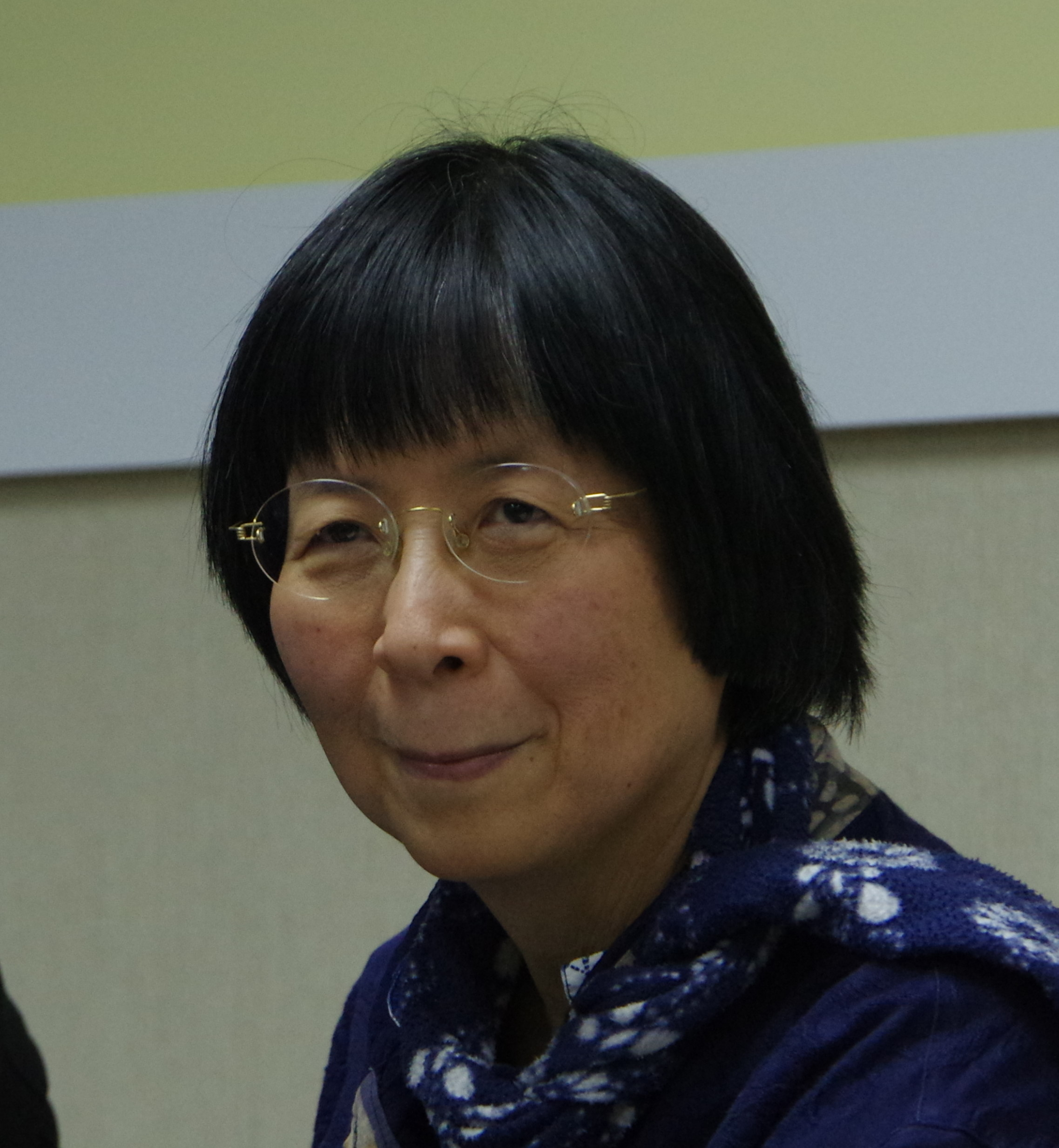
- 2015 TIBE
- Born: March 11, 1950; Taipei City
- Died: May 7, 2022 (aged 72)

Hu Tai-li (March 11, 1950 – May 7, 2022) was a Taiwanese anthropologist and documentary director from Taipei. She graduated from Taipei First Girls' High School, obtained her bachelor's degree in history from National Taiwan University, and later earned her master's and doctoral degrees in anthropology from the Graduate Center of the City University of New York.

Since 1979, Hu worked at the Institute of Ethnology at the Academia Sinica, and in 2015, she became the director of the Institute of Ethnology. She also served as an adjunct professor in the Anthropology Department at National Tsing Hua University.

Hu was the first and second president of the Taiwan International Ethnographic Film Association and founded the Taiwan International Ethnographic Film Festival in 2001.

== Works ==
Hu is the pioneer of Taiwanese ethnographic documentary. Her work Passing Through My Mother-in-law's Village (1997) is the first documentary screened publicly in commercial theater in Taiwan.

=== Academic works ===
- Hu, Tai-li. My mother-in-law's village: Rural industrialization and change in Taiwan. City University of New York, 1983.
- Tai-Li, Hu. "Ethnic Identity an Social Condition of Veteran-Mainlanders in Taiwan." Revue européenne des sciences sociales 27, no. 84 (1989): 253–265.
- Hu, Tai-li. "The Development of" Indigenous People Documentaries" in Early Twenty-first Century Taiwan, and the Concern with" Tradition"." Concentric: Literary and Cultural Studies 39, no. 1 (2013): 149-159.
- Hu, Tai-li, Pamela J. Stewart, and Andrew Strathern. "The camera is working: Paiwan aesthetics and performances in Taiwan." Expressive Genres and Historical Change: Indonesia, Papua New Guinea and Taiwan (2005): 153–72.
- Tai-Li, Hu. "The Emergence of Small-Scale Industry in." Women, Men, and the International Division of Labor (1983): 387.

=== Documentaries ===
- 1984 The Return of Gods and Ancestors: Paiwan Five Year Ceremony
- 1988 Songs of Pasta'ay
- 1993 Voices of Orchid Island
- 1997 Passing Through My Mother-in-law's Village
- 2000 Sounds of Love and Sorrow
- 2004 Stone Dream
- 2012 Returning Souls

=== Books ===
- 1982 《媳婦入門：田野心影錄》（臺北：時報出版公司。1997年增訂新版）
- 1984 My Mother-in law's Village: Rural Industrialization and Change in Taiwan. (Taipei: Institute of Ethnology, Academia Sinica)
- 1986 《性與死》（臺北：時報出版公司初版）
- 1991 《燃燒憂鬱》（臺北：張老師文化事業公司）
- 2001 《排灣族的鼻笛與口笛》（胡台麗、錢善華、賴朝財合著）（臺北：國立傳統藝術中心籌備處）
- 2003 《文化展演與臺灣原住民》（臺北：聯經出版事業有限公司）
- 2011 《排灣文化的詮釋》（臺北：聯經出版事業有限公司）
