= Government of China (disambiguation) =

The Government of China refers to the State Council of the People's Republic of China, also known as the Central People's Government.

Government of China may also refer to:

== People's Republic of China ==
- Central People's Government (1949–1954)

== Republic of China ==
- Provisional government (1912–1913)
- Beiyang government (1912–1928)
- Constitutional Protection junta (1917–1920; 1920–1921)
- Guangzhou government (1921–1922)
- Army and Navy Marshal stronghold (1923–1925)
- Nationalist government (1925–1948)
- Wuhan government (1926–1927)
- Constitutional government (1948-present)

== Imperial China ==
- Government of the Han dynasty (202 BC–220 AD)
- Government of the Qing dynasty (1644–1912)

== Japanese puppets ==
- Provisional Government of the Republic of China (1937–1940)
- Reformed Government of the Republic of China (1938–1940)
- Reorganized National Government of the Republic of China (1940–1945)

== See also ==
- Government of the special administrative regions of China
  - Government of Hong Kong
  - Government of Macau
- Politics of China
- Political systems of Imperial China
- Constituents of historical governments of China before 1912:
  - Emperor of China (List of Chinese monarchs)
  - Chancellor of China
  - Nine Ministers
  - Grand Secretariat
  - Three Departments and Six Ministries
  - Three Excellencies
  - Imperial examinations
- Fujian People's Government
