= Hui nationalism =

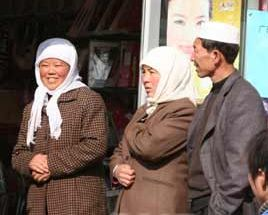
Hui Muslims in China

Hui nationalism refers to the common identity among diverse communities of Chinese-speaking Muslims (typically members of the Hui ethnic-cultural group). Hui pan-nationalism should be distinguished from nationalist sentiments by minority groups who are also Muslim such as those of the Uyghurs. These sentiments are grounded upon the Hui "zealously preserving and protecting their identity as enclaves ensconced in the dominant Han society."

== Significant contributors ==
=== Ya’wub Wang Jingzhai ===
Ya’wub Wang Jingzhai (1879–1949) was an early theorist and religious scholar, also known as one of the “Four Great Akhonds”. Wang Jingzhai promoted the compatibility of pan-Islamic identity with Hui nationalism, and Hui nationalism with Chinese nationalism. These concepts stimulated traction among the Hui community, but were also threatened by increasing Japanese mobilisation of the Hui, and later invasion during WWII.

== Present day ==
Maintaining the identity of the Hui was critical during the nascent state of the People's Republic of China. Scholars such as Claude Lefort, attribute the fundamental nature of authoritarianism and totalitarianism, is to concentrate nationality in order to maintain power, and have a united enemy against the interference of foreign powers. Thus, citizenship was imposed rather than sought onto minorities. The ultimate policy that governs the Hui's promotes both assimilation and autonomy, an “irony that continues to plague China’s nationality policy.”

== See also ==
- Chinese nationalism
- Islam in China
