= Local ethnic nationalism =

Non-Han or localist nationalism in mainland China

Local [ethnic] nationalism
- Traditional Chinese: 地方民族主義
- Simplified Chinese: 地方民族主义
Transcriptions
Standard Mandarin
- Hanyu Pinyin: dìfāng mínzú zhǔyì
- Bopomofo: ㄉㄧˋ ㄈㄤ ㄇㄧㄣˊ ㄗㄨˊ ㄓㄨˇ ㄧˋ

Alternative Chinese name
- Traditional Chinese: 狹隘民族主義
- Simplified Chinese: 狭隘民族主义
- Literal meaning: Narrow nationalism
Transcriptions
Standard Mandarin
- Hanyu Pinyin: xiáài mínzú zhǔyì
- Bopomofo: ㄒㄧㄚˊ ㄞˋ ㄇㄧㄣˊ ㄗㄨˊ ㄓㄨˇ ㄧˋ

Local ethnic nationalism, simply local nationalism or local ethnic chauvinism is a term first used by Mao Zedong regarding perceived nationalist sentiment of certain groups in China.

In mainland China, "local ethnic nationalism/chauvinism" contrasts with "Han nationalism" (or "Han chauvinism"), but both are perceived as divisive ideas.

== History ==
During the Taiwan under Japanese rule, Xie Xuehong supported "Taiwan independence" (rather than pan-Chinese nationalism) by organizing the Taiwanese Communist Party in Shanghai. In the 1950s, Taiwan Democratic Self-Government League leader Xie supported Taiwanese self-determination over Chinese unification, which led to her being denounced as a "local [ethnic] nationalist" by Mao Zedong and his supporters during the Anti-Rightist Campaign.

Local ethnic nationalism was an issue when leaders of the former East Turkestan Republic joined with Han Chinese communists to form a governing coalition in Xinjiang.

On September 1, 1979, Deng Xiaoping, while listening to the report of the 14th National Conference on United Front Work, said: There are indeed many problems in the national work to which attention should be paid; the current issue is how to strengthen national unity and oppose 'great Han-ism' (大漢族主義) and 'local ethnic nationalism' (地方民族主義), and there is also 'great [ethnic] nationalism' (大民族主義) in some ethnic minorities.

== See also ==
- Anti-Han sentiment
- Chinese nationalism (Zhonghua minzu)
- Ethnic nationalism in Japan
- Han nationalism
- Indigenism
- Peripheral nationalism
- Secession in China
- Separatism
