= Han nationalism =

Ethnicity-exclusive form of Chinese nationalism

- the Iron-blood Eighteen-Star Flag, nine pointed stars symbolizing the Nine Provinces and eighteen round stars representing Han lands.
- Traditional Chinese: 漢民族主義
- Simplified Chinese: 汉民族主义
Transcriptions
Standard Mandarin
- Hanyu Pinyin: Hàn mínzú zhǔyì
- Bopomofo: ㄏㄢˋ ㄇㄧㄣˊ ㄗㄨˊ ㄓㄨˇ ㄧˋ

Flag of the Revive China Society led by Sun Yat-sen

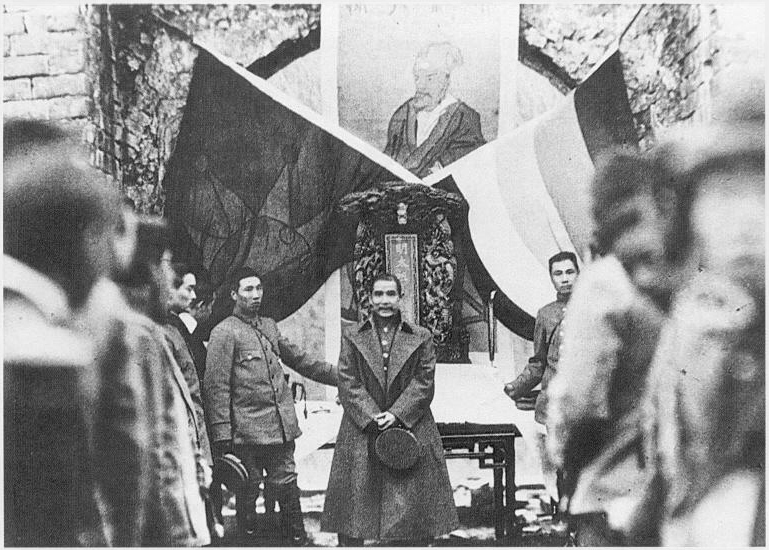
Sun Yat-sen and other members of the Government of the Republic of China visited the mausoleum of Emperor Hongwu of the Ming dynasty, February 15, 1912

Han nationalism is a form of ethnic or racial nationalism asserting ethnically Han Chinese as the exclusive constituents of the Chinese nation. It is often in dialogue with other conceptions of Chinese nationalism, often mutually-exclusive or otherwise contradictory ones. Han Chinese are the dominant ethnic group in both states claiming to represent the Chinese nation: the Republic of China and the People's Republic of China.

Han Chinese also constitute a sizable ethnic minority or plurality group in a number of other countries, such as Malaysia and Singapore. In the modern era, ethnicity's role in the Chinese nation continues to color conceptions of Chinese culture, geopolitics, and history.

== History ==
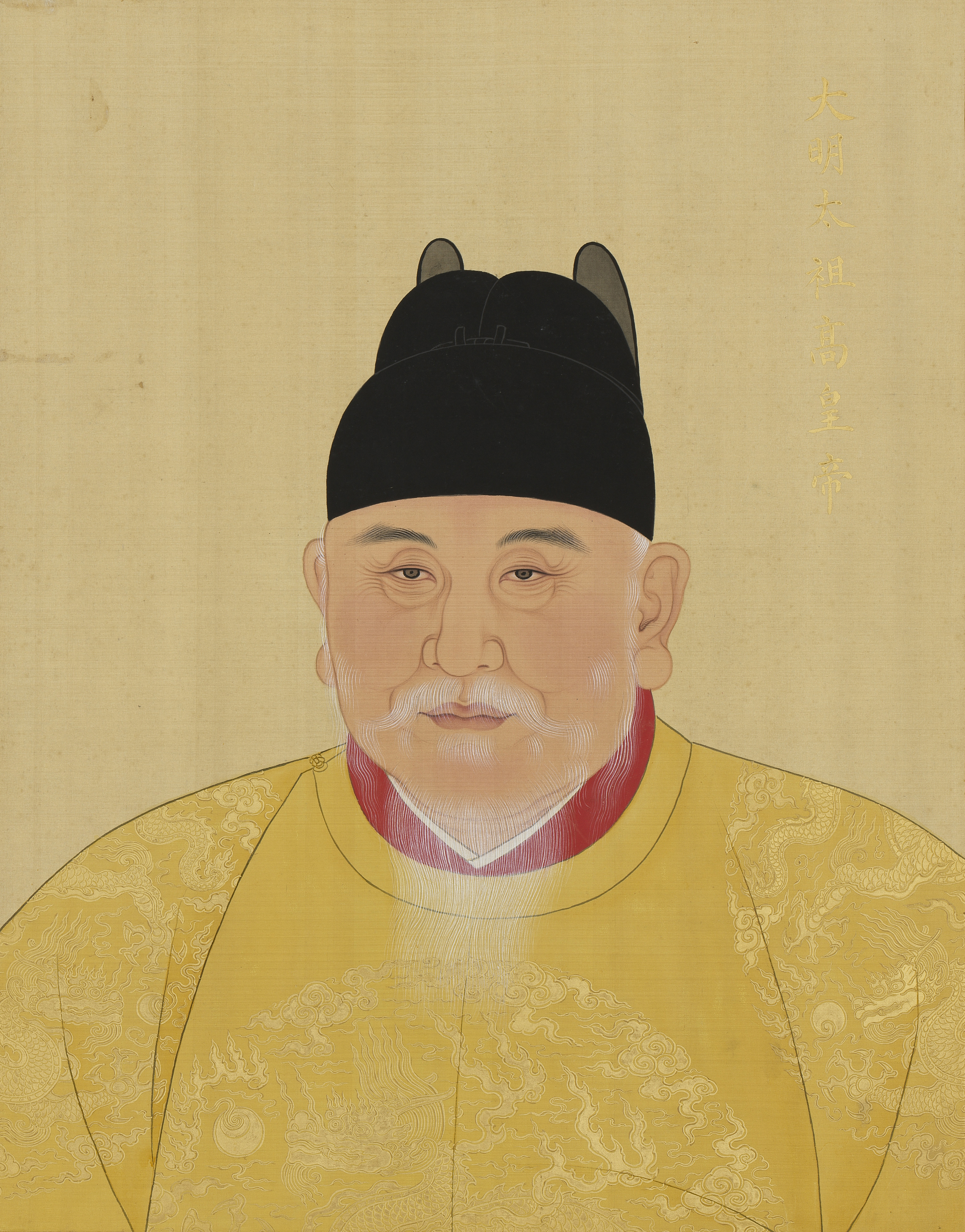
The Hongwu Emperor

Unlike Chinese nationalism, Han Chinese nationalism has a historical root of being strongly stressed on the Han Chinese people, the dominant ethnic group of China that originates from Huaxia or Sinitic people. Han Chinese nationalism has often been used as a rallying force, stemming from the historical pride of the Han Chinese people in developing one of the world's earliest civilizations.

Since the Han dynasty, ideas of Han Chinese superiority have been frequently used in attempts to expand China's territory. Examples of this can be seen in previous Chinese invasions of Korea and Vietnam, and in historical conquests of Central Asia, Tibet, Xinjiang and Mongolia. This was later inherited by later dynasties of China, notably the Tang dynasty and the Ming dynasty. The Tang dynasty exerted control beyond the border of old Huaxia, allowing the later Ming dynasty to become a major naval power. Han Chinese ideas of superiority were complex, with contrasting Confucian narratives of Han superiority and ones of diversity in the army and the Empire.

Han Chinese nationalism also played a key part in rallying against non-Han control of China. The Han Chinese nationalist movement led by Ming dynasty's Hongwu Emperor played an instrumental role in the overthrow of the Mongol Yuan dynasty. Han Chinese nationalism was also integral to the rebellion against the Manchu Qing dynasty and became increasingly institutionalized following the Century of Humiliation. These rebellions were often led by Han Chinese nationalists, including Sun Yat-sen, who considered the Manchu Qing dynasty corrupt and immoral, and took an aggressive stance against Western imperialism. The Boxer Rebellion in late 19th century had been seen as another specific part of Han Chinese nationalism juxtaposed against Western imperialism in China, where Han Chinese nationalists were against Western and modern ideas and sought to revive old Chinese traditions.

Among the rhetorical strategies of the Xinhai revolutionaries was to characterize the Qing dynasty as complicit in foreign domination of the Chinese nation because the Qing were ethnic Manchus. After the establishment of the Republic of China, they expanded the definition of the nation to Five Races Under One Union (Han, Manchu, Mongol, Hui, and Tibetan).

Han Chinese nationalism remains prominent in China today. Chinese leaders have employed Han nationalist sentiments, including the ongoing Han domination of China, and promotion of nationalism, as witnessed in the Republic's domestic and foreign relations.

=== Han chauvinism ===
Han chauvinism is described as a more radical form of Han nationalism by the Chinese Communist Party (CCP). The CCP chairman Mao Zedong coined the term in order to describe the chauvinism of the Han Chinese, first on 16 March 1953, in order to criticize the ethnocentrism that existed among the Han Chinese in China. In a party directive which was drafted for the Central Committee of the Chinese Communist Party titled "Criticize Han Chauvinism," Mao said, "In some places, the relations between nationalities are far from normal. For Communists, this is an intolerable situation. We must go to the root and criticize the Han chauvinist ideas which exist to a serious degree among many Party members and cadres ..."

It appeared again in a 1956 speech, titled Ten Major Relations, Mao stated that "on the relationship between the Han ethnicity and minority ethnicities ... we put the emphasis on opposing Han chauvinism". This anti-chauvinistic idea is part of the People's Republic of China's zhonghua minzu conception of China as a multi-ethnic nation, both historically and in the present, which includes not only the Han but also 55 ethnic minorities. This is expressed in the constitution of China, which states that China is a "unitary [multiethnic] state created jointly by the people of all its ethnicities" and "it is necessary to combat big [ethnic group] chauvinism, mainly Han chauvinism, and combat local [ethnic] national[ist] chauvinism".

The PRC's notions of Han chauvinism and China as a multicultural state have been subjected to criticism, mainly by the western media. One critical view is that the Han Chinese "are less homogeneous than official policy recognizes". Zhonghua minzu has been criticized as an invention of the 20th century, and was adopted by the Communist Party only to criticize the failures of the rival Kuomintang (KMT), which officially promoted zhonghua minzu as part of its nationalist ideology. Many policies have been made to give privilege to minority ethnicities, leading to grudges from some of the Han Chinese. Despite this, authorities in China have also denied the existence of racism or racial discrimination in China.

In post-Mao China, Han chauvinism has been recognized as a threat by successive generations of its leadership, including the administration of CCP General Secretary Xi Jinping. However, Xi Jinping's concept of a Chinese Dream is believed to have distinctly Han dimensions, and it is also believed to support Han chauvinism even if it is unwittingly doing so. The fusion of traditional Han chauvinism with Chinese nationalism as practiced by the modern Chinese state has been described as Han-centrism.

== Relations with Chinese nationalism ==
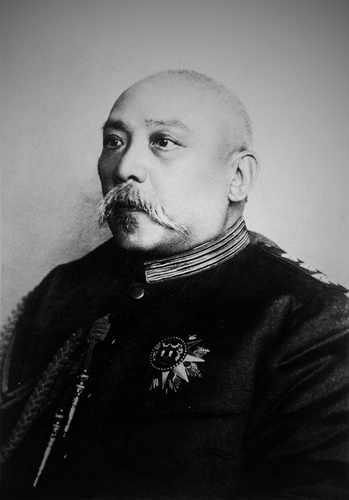
Yuan Shikai, a nationalist from the Beiyang government

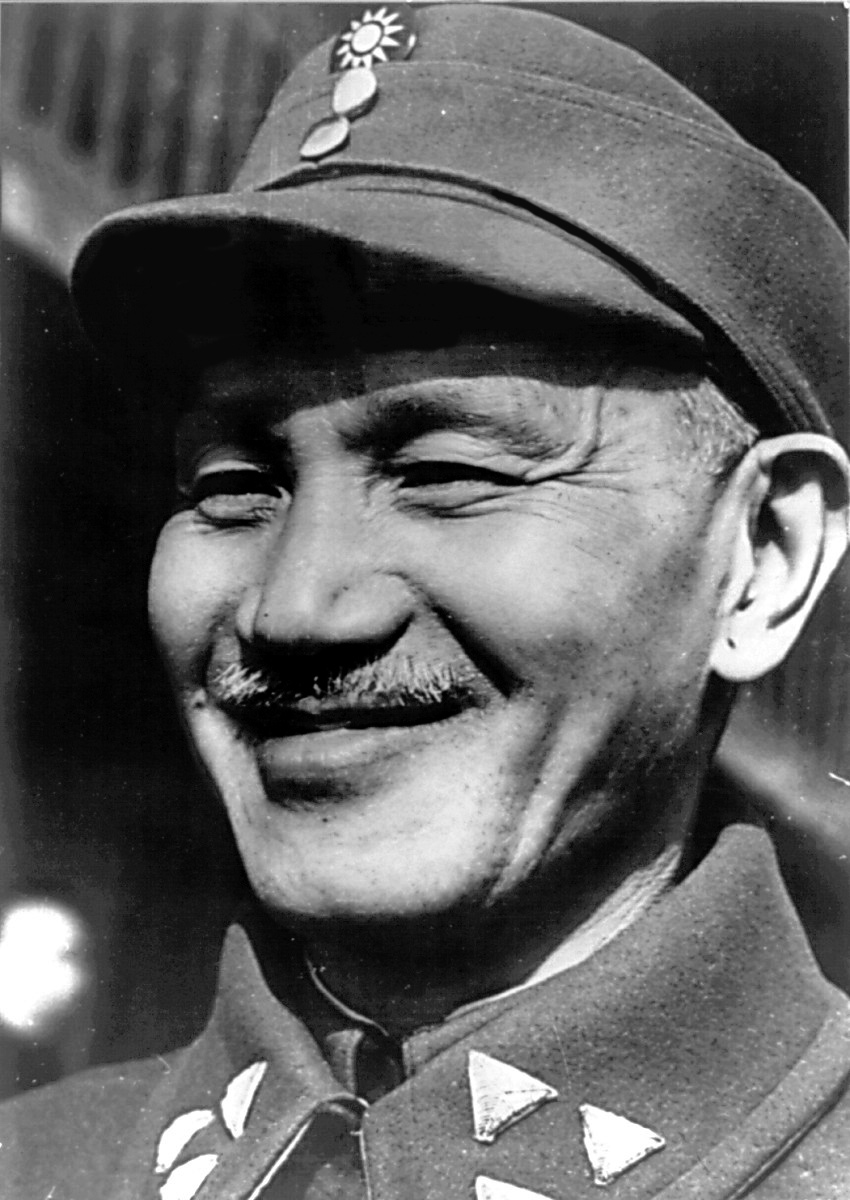
Chiang Kai-shek, a Kuomintang nationalist

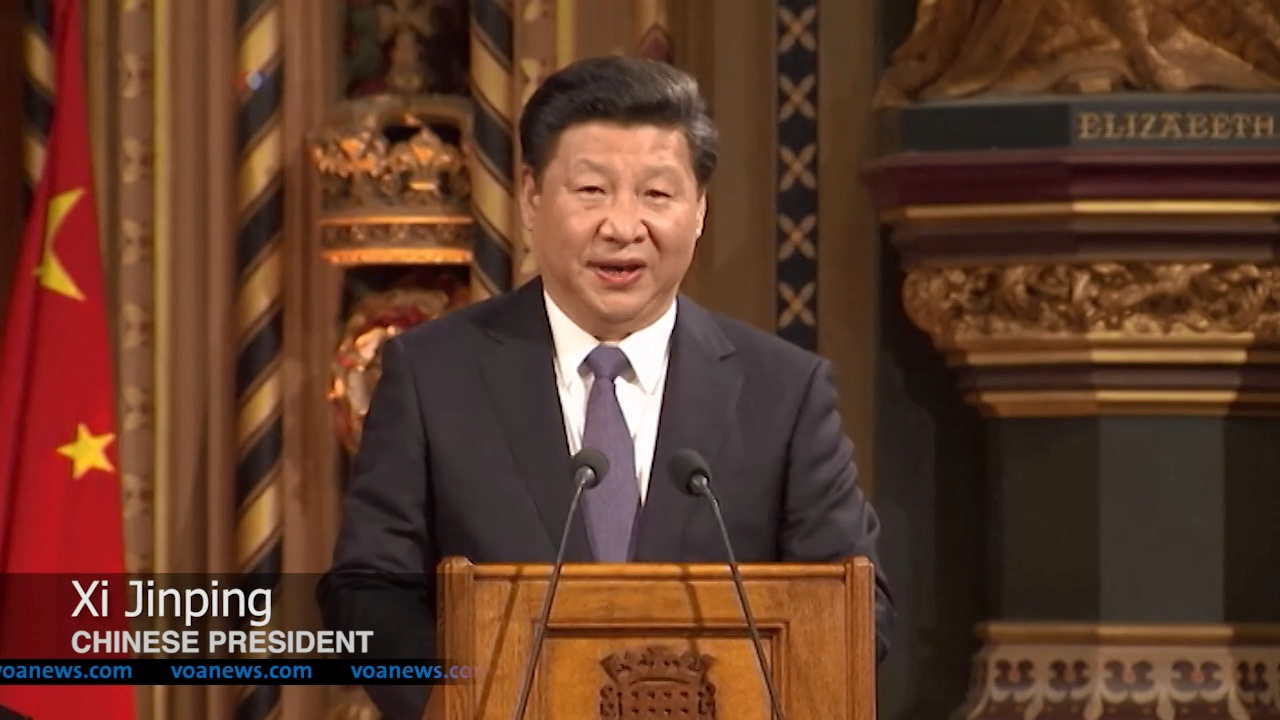
Xi Jinping, a communist nationalist

Although Han Chinese nationalism and Chinese nationalism are different in terms of ideology, with the latter often emphasizing a more multi-ethnic form of nationalism, both forms of nationalism have frequently been connected and espoused together, due to historical and current control of China by the ethnic Han Chinese majority. The concept was first debated in the early 20th century; one of those who debated it was Zhang Taiyan, who strongly opposed the development of a multi-ethnic form of nationalism which was proposed by Yang Du and Liang Qichao, stressed the existence of the Han ethnic bloodline as evidence of the greatness of China and rejected the notion of a multiethnic China, being skeptical of non-Han ethnic groups like Manchus, Mongols, Tibetans and Turkic Muslims. Zhang Taiyan strongly criticized non-Han ethnic groups, notably the Manchus, he considered the Manchus and other non-Han Chinese oppressors and believed that they could not be assimilated because they had no understanding of Han Chinese culture and customs. There were, however, significant proponents of a multi-ethnic form of Chinese nationalism as well, and Tibet remained independent during the rule of the Republic of China.

The multifaceted image of Han Chinese nationalism continued to develop during the formation of the modern Chinese state. Han Chinese nationalists had a low opinion of ethnic Uyghurs and Tibetans, viewing them as threats to the Chinese state due to their different cultures and their lack of sympathy for ethnic Han Chinese — resulting in several conflicts during the 1930s and 1940s. Han Chinese nationalism also played a role during World War II, a war which was waged in conjunction with the Second Sino-Japanese War as a part of World War II, a war in which the Han Chinese people frequently suffered, and fought, against the Japanese.

== In ethnic relations ==
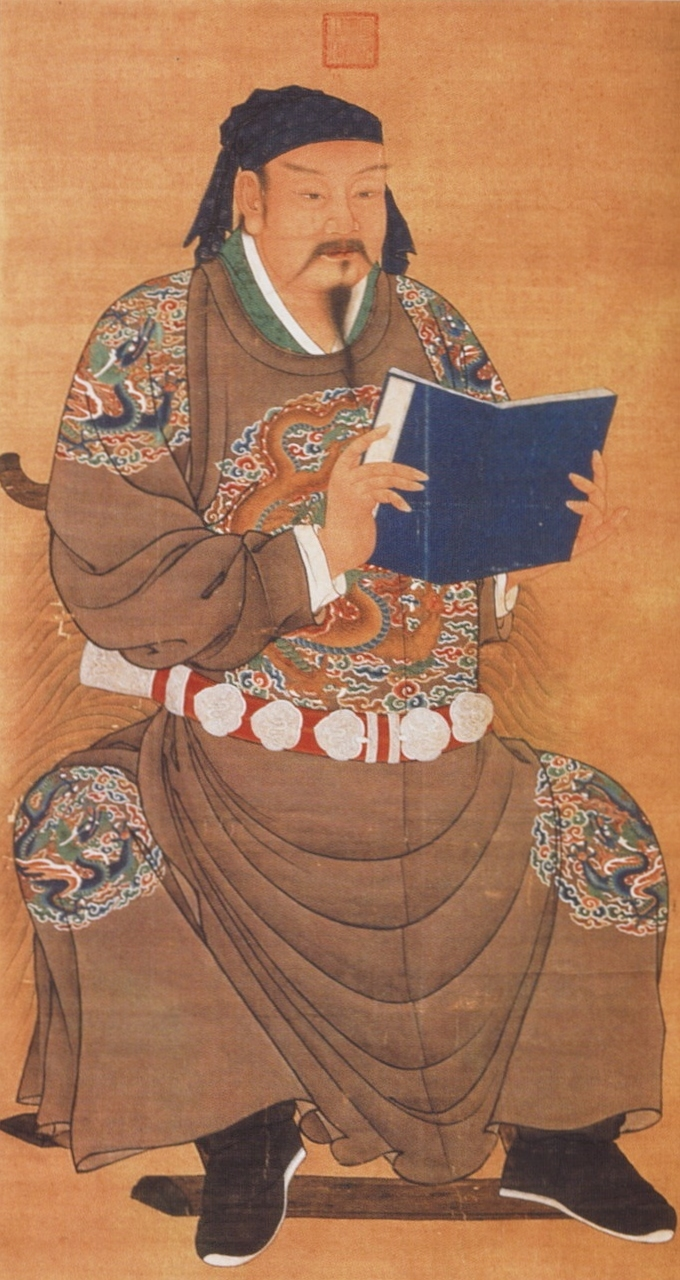
Qing dynasty illustration of Yue Fei, who led Southern Song armies against the Jurchen Jin dynasty

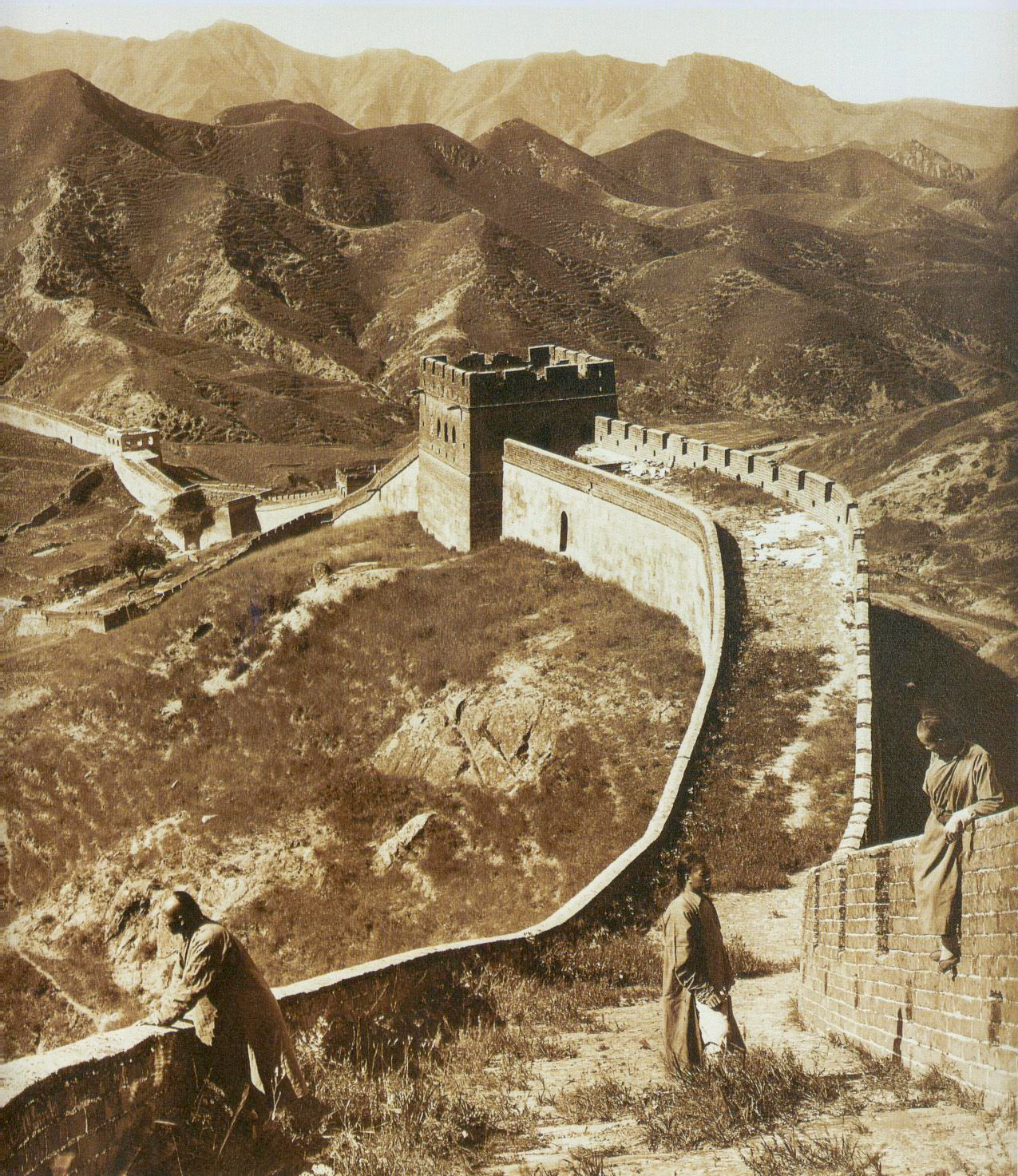
The Great Wall, a national symbol of China

Although the current Chinese government has largely attempted to promote the idea of a multiethnic nationalism with Han Chinese is the main people instead of a singular ethnic nationalism, scholars and analysts have pointed about the lack of an agreed-upon definition of Chinese nationalism may have impacted on China's political decision with regard to other non-Han Chinese people or nations.

=== Tibetans ===
Since the annexation of Tibet by the People's Republic of China in 1950, Han Chinese nationalists, with support from the PRC government, have been distributing historical documents which portray Tibetan culture as barbaric in order to justify Chinese control of the territory of Tibet; as such, many members of Chinese society have a negative view of Tibet. Han Chinese continue to maintain the view that Tibet was historically a feudal society which practiced serfdom/slavery and that this only changed due to Chinese influence in the region in order to liberate the Tibetans from its own backwardness and China's duty is to bring civilization to Tibetans. Furthermore, Han nationalists endorse Princess Wencheng, an ancient Chinese princess who purportedly married king Songsten Gampo of Tibet and introduced Buddhism to Tibet. Further, Han Chinese extremists believe that Tibetans [and Mongols, Uyghurs] are actually part of the wider Han Chinese family with different genetics.

=== Uyghurs ===
Since being conquered in 1758, Uyghurs from Xinjiang have had issues with the Manchurian and later Chinese governments. Han migration dating back to the Qing dynasty led to the increasing sinicization of the region, which the policy further extended to ethnic relations. Han and Hui people often live closer to Uighurs and many developed a negative stereotype of them.

=== Mongols ===
Inner Mongolia has been largely pacified since the 20th century, due to massive Han migration and intermarriage. Mongols have been perceived to be better integrated into the society than that of Uyghurs and Tibetans. However, this is also where the infamous Inner Mongolia incident happened, leading to deaths of 16,000 to 27,000 Mongols. Further policies deemed to be anti-Mongol by the Han Chinese government had led to 2011 Inner Mongolia unrest and was followed by another wave of unrest in 2015 against the exploitation and misuse of Mongol lands, as well as perceived bias in favor of ethnic Han Chinese.

== Han Taiwanese nationalism ==
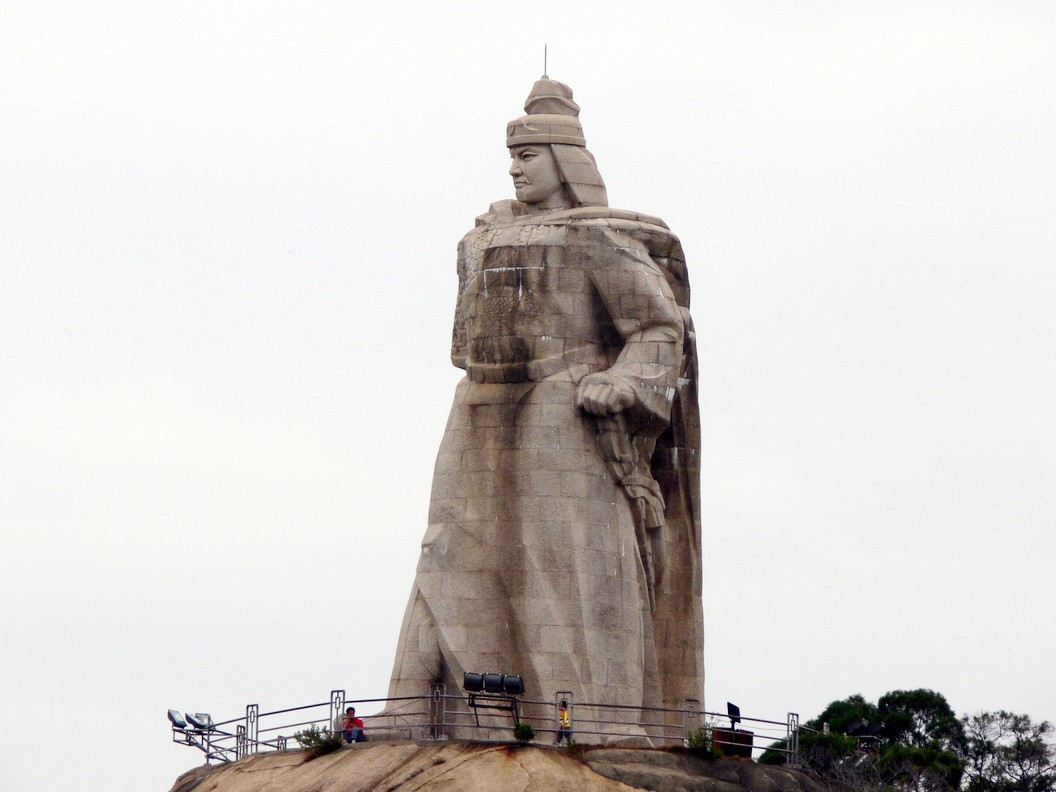
The statue of Zheng Chenggong, a Ming loyalist, in Fujian.

In Taiwan, Han-centric Taiwanese nationalism is distinct from Han-centric Chinese nationalism. Han Taiwanese nationalism focuses on non-mainlanders and non-Austronesians, including Hokkien and Hakka. However, not all Taiwanese nationalists are Han nationalists. Zheng Chenggong, who founded the Kingdom of Tungning, was a representative early Han nationalist in Taiwan, though he was of half Japanese ancestry. In 2004, then-Taiwanese Vice President and pro-Taiwan independence activist Annette Lu caused controversy by making Han-centric comments about Taiwanese indigenous peoples.

== See also ==
- Chinese ethnic nationalism (disambiguation)
- Anti-Qing sentiment
  - Timeline of late anti-Qing rebellions
- Chinese imperialism
- Chiangism
- Dai Jitao Thought
- Hua–Yi distinction
- Hanjian
- Local ethnic nationalism
- Radical pro-unification faction (Taiwan)
- Sinicization
- Yan Huang Zisun
- Similar nationalisms:
  - Persian nationalism (Iran)
  - Völkisch nationalism (Germany)
  - Yamato nationalism (Japan)
