= Han chauvinism =

Ethnocentric attitudes among ethnic Han within China

- Traditional Chinese: 大漢族主義
- Simplified Chinese: 大汉族主义
- Literal meaning: Great Han-ism
Transcriptions
Standard Mandarin
- Hanyu Pinyin: Dà Hànzú zhǔyì
- Bopomofo: ㄉㄚˋ ㄏㄢˋㄗㄨˊ ㄓㄨˇㄧˋ
- Wade–Giles: Ta4 han4-tsu2 chu3-i4

Alternative Chinese name
- Traditional Chinese: 大漢民族主義
- Simplified Chinese: 大汉民族主义
- Literal meaning: Great Han nationalism
Transcriptions
Standard Mandarin
- Hanyu Pinyin: Dà Hàn mínzú zhǔyì
- Bopomofo: ㄉㄚˋ ㄏㄢˋ ㄇㄧㄣˊ ㄗㄨˊ ㄓㄨˇㄧˋ
- Wade–Giles: Ta4 han4 min2-tsu2 chu3-i4

Han chauvinism is the sentiment that Han Chinese culture and way of life are superior to others. It has officially been criticized by the government of the People's Republic of China. However, despite this official stance, scholars and human rights observers argue that recent state policies—particularly under Xi Jinping—have increasingly promoted Han-centric assimilation and Sinicization while suppressing non-Han ethnic identities.

== History ==
Mao Zedong first criticized Han chauvinism in 1938 and these criticisms continued throughout his tenure as China's leader. For example, Mao's 1956 speech On the Ten Major Relationships emphasizes the need to oppose Han chauvinism. In 1957, Mao contended in On the Correct Handling of Contradictions among the People that "the key to getting Han-minority relations right is overcoming Han chauvinism."

Responding to ethnic tensions in China's interior in 1956, Mao, Liu Shaoqi, and other central government leaders called for an end to Han Chauvinism. In April 1956, Party committees in ethnic minority areas began analyzing the state of ethnic relations, focused on opposing Han Chauvinism. As part of the 1956 review of ethnic policy, the Party center stated that minority cadres "have the right to bravely criticize Han chauvinism."

The Chinese Communist Party (CCP)'s notions of China as a multicultural state have been subjected to criticism by the western media. Many policies have been made to give privileges to minority ethnicities, leading to legal inequality.

CCP former leader Deng Xiaoping also criticized Han chauvinism.

The current CCP general secretary Xi Jinping has officially criticized Han chauvinism. However, the Chinese Dream, a core concept of Xi is believed by some to have Han-centric dimensions.

== In ethnic relations ==
Although the current Chinese government has largely attempted to promote the idea of a multiethnic nationalism instead of a singular ethnic nationalism, individuals have pointed about the lack of an agreed-upon definition of Chinese nationalism may have impacted on China's political decision with regard to other non-Han people and non-Chinese nations.

=== Tibetans ===
Since the annexation of Tibet by the People's Republic of China, controversy has existed because of the view that Tibet was historically a "feudal region that practiced serfdom" until communist influence in the region ended the practice. Some academics have described relations with Tibetans as a form of Han settler colonialism.

=== Xinjiang ===
Since 1758, the region of Xinjiang has issues with government policy, which further extend to ethnic relations. Han and Hui people often live closer to Uyghurs, and stereotypes were developed.

=== Mongols ===
Mongols have been perceived to be better integrated into society than Uyghurs and Tibetans. However, there were ethnic tensions and stereotypes.

== Relationship to Chinese nationalism ==
Han nationalism and Chinese nationalism (as well as Han Chinese chauvinism or Chinese chauvinism) are different in terms of ideology, with the latter frequently focusing on a more multiethnic form of nationalism. There were a significant and large group of proponents of a multiethnic form of Chinese nationalism along with other scholars as well.

The multifaceted image of Han Chinese nationalism further developed during the buildup to modern Chinese statehood. Han Chinese nationalism also played a part in World War II, when the Second Sino-Japanese War occurred, where the Han Chinese people frequently suffered, and fought, against the Japanese. The modern slogan of many Chinese nationalists, particularly of the Han is that "some people are bronze (with relation to black and brown people), some are silver (with relation to white people), but we are gold (i.e. golden-skinned Chinese people)".

== See also ==
- Anti-Han sentiment
- Great Russian chauvinism
- Hoklo chauvinism
- Hua–Yi distinction
- Local ethnic nationalism
- Sinocentrism
