= Sinicization of the Manchus =

Assimilation into Han-dominated Chinese society

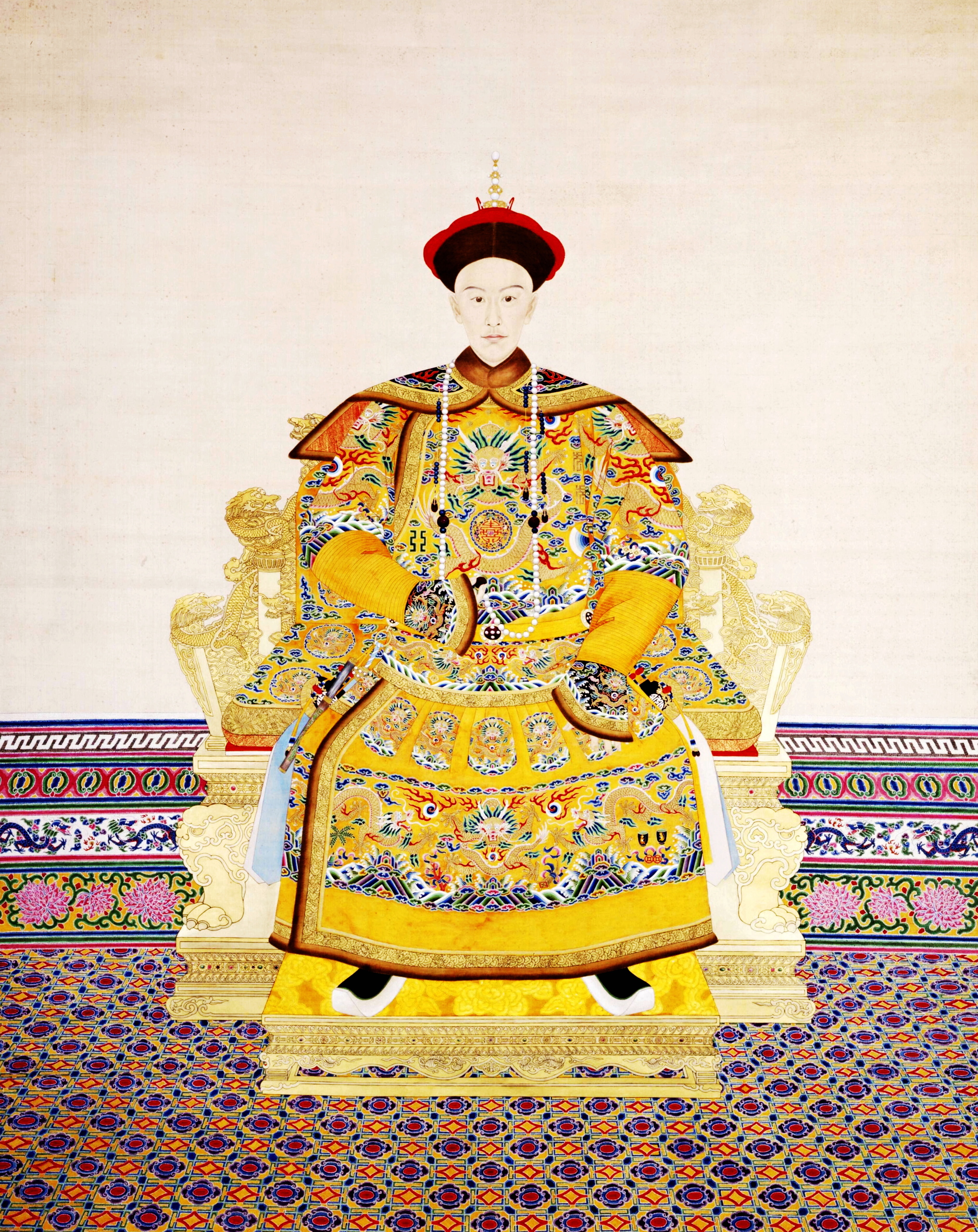
The Guangxu Emperor of the House of Aisin-Gioro, penultimate Emperor of the Qing dynasty

The Sinicization of the Manchus was the process in which the Manchu people became assimilated into the Han-dominated Chinese society. It occurred most prominently during the Qing dynasty when the new Manchu rulers actively attempted to assimilate themselves and their people with the Han to increase the legitimacy of the new dynasty. As a result, when the Qing dynasty fell, many Manchu had already adopted Han Chinese customs, languages and surnames (for example, some descendants of the ruling imperial House of Aisin-Gioro adopted the Han Chinese surname Jin 金).

== Background ==
The ancestors of the Manchu people, the Jurchens, originally formed the Jin dynasty located to the Song dynasty's northeast. The Jurchen Jin already started assimilating Han Chinese language, and even their Jurchen script was influenced by Chinese characters (hanzi). When both the Jin and Song were absorbed by the Yuan dynasty (Mongol empire), the Jurchens became further assimilated into Chinese society while living as subjects alongside Han, Mongol, and various other ethnicities under one unified empire. After the Yuan, the Jurchens became subjects of the Ming empire, with many Jurchen people even studying the Han Chinese language and adopting Chinese culture themselves, while still maintaining their original identity, language, and customs.

In 1583, the Manchu chieftain Nurhaci began to unify the Jurchen ministries. After the establishment of the Later Jin dynasty, the Manchu-Han relationship was further developed. Later, during the Huang Taiji period, the communication and trade between Manchu and Han became closer. In 1644, the regent king Dorgon led the Eight Banners soldiers to enter the Shanhai Pass, and the Qing dynasty replaced the Ming dynasty as the ruling dynasty of China. The bureaucratic system, land management, military establishment, and culture of the Qing Dynasty were all subject to drastic changes due to the prevalent influence of the Central Plains region in China.

During the Qianlong period, Han culture was revered among Manchus, and the relationship between Manchus and Han people also gained many advantages. Many Han officials also promoted the development of the Qing dynasty. It can be said that without these Han officials, the demise of the Qing dynasty would have been faster.

Although the Manchus were not of Han Chinese origin, they absorbed a lot of Han Chinese culture before conquering the Ming dynasty, especially in southern China where they were strongly resisted. The new Manchu rulers retained many of the systems that existed during the Ming dynasty.

== Central government institutions ==
The central government system of the Qing dynasty mostly followed the Ming dynasty, but adjusted to the needs of the current society they ruled. The duties of government of the Qing dynasty granted fewer rights than the previous generation. After a long period of exploration, the Manchu dynasty finally completed the highly centralized political system of imperial power and developed the centralized political system to its peak. During Emperor Yongzheng's reign, he established a secret reserve system, which was based on the special historical traditions and political culture of the Manchu society. It was a major change to the ancient Chinese tradition of succession to the throne and to the Manchurian state and development.

== The operation of the banners ==
During and after the Qing dynasty, the Manchu and Han people lived together, and Manchu people learned the Han people's life and production methods. The Manchu people gradually absorbed the Han culture. With deep communication between the Manchu and Han ethnicities and intermarriage, the changes in Manchu identity became more and more pronounced. The primary manifestation of this change was in the way of production, especially in the management of land.

Due to the long-term wars between the Ming and Qing dynasties, large numbers of Han farmers were forced to leave their hometown and move to other places. With the above conditions, the rulers of the Qing dynasty used their political power to seize large amounts of land from the Han people and forcibly redistribute the land. This caused certain damage and blockade of agricultural production in the north.

Therefore, the Manchu rulers could not impose their own mode of production, which is the serf system, on the Han and could only let the Han's original mode of production, the rent system, to continue. Under the strong influence of the feudal tenancy system, the serfdom system gradually declined. In terms of production methods, Manchu and Han are basically the same, and the original differences have gradually disappeared.

== Expansion of the Eight Banners system ==
Since the ancestors of the Manchus were a hunting nation, they were good at riding and shooting, and the soldiers were very strong. After the Qing dynasty, under the impact of the Han's highly feudal economy, the Manchu people and the Han people lived together and absorbed the advanced system of the Han ethnicity, and Nurhaci created the Eight Banners system. Nurhaci's successor, his eighth son, Hong Taiji (r. 1626–1642), went further in adopting Han system and using more Han officials. At the same time, the preparation of the Eight Banners has also expanded.

== The integration and development of culture ==
The evolution of the Manchu language was a major event that bought about the progress of Manchu society and culture, and expanded their trade with neighboring peoples. It transformed the Manchus from a tribal to a bureaucratic society, helping them further carry out administrative practices in accordance with the experience of the Han people. upon the establishment of the Qing dynasty, its rulers actively absorbed the Han culture but opposed the complete sinicization of the Manchus and strongly advocated preserving fundamental Manchu customs.

However, according to the social environment at that time, the Manchus were sparsely populated, and when they first arrived in the Central Plains, the language and geography were unfamiliar. If the aristocrats of the Manchu depended only on the strength of their own people, they would rule the vast territory with a minority population of less than one million to rule over hundreds of millions of Han and other ethnic groups, which would be quite difficult. At the same time, the Manchu did not originally possess the advanced technological or bureaucratic systems that the Han Chinese did, nor did the Manchu originally have their own writing system (which would develop during the formation of the Qing under Nurhaci and others). Therefore, the Manchu people adapted to new forms of social organization and absorbed and learned from the advanced political, economic, and cultural systems of the Central Plains. In the process of learning and integration, the language of the Manchus and Han ethnicities blended in various activities. In order to facilitate communication, the Manchu language borrowed many Han Chinese loanwords as well as Chinese language structures and grammatical elements. During the course of the Qing, the Manchu developed their own alphabet (based on the Mongol script), and their language became deeply influenced by Han Chinese language and culture.

== Evaluation ==
The sinicization of the Manchus played a great role in stabilizing the civilization and establishing the foundation of the Qing dynasty. The following points can be summarized on the development of the Manchu-Han relationship and integration during the Qing:

1. The formation and growth of the Manchus has a close relationship with the absorption of the Han population. A large number of Han Chinese were incorporated into the Eight Banners, which effectively promoted the development of the Manchu. In 1644, after the Qing army entered the customs, the establishment of the Eight Banners was rapidly expanded. These absorbed Han people imported new blood into the Manchu community. It can also be said that they were Manchurian and played an important role in promoting the development of the Manchus.
2. The Manchus were enculturated into the Han culture, and the Manchus and Han learned from each other and advanced and retreated together. This is an inevitable trend of historical development, according to Zhang Jian of Shenzhen University. The close communication between Manchu and Han and their mixed offspring effectively promoted the integration of the nation and the progress of the Manchus.
3. The Manchus have been martial and pragmatic in character since ancient times. The Han people were deeply influenced by the Four Books and the Five Classics and the Confucian traditional morality. On the other hand, the rulers of the Manchu dynasty were incorporated into the profound Chinese culture unconsciously; on the other hand, under the psychological drive of maintaining the ancestral system, the rulers strived to maintain the national identity. Therefore, in such a large environment, Manchu culture constantly collided and merged. However, the sinicization of the Manchu was not completed; it was a process of learning from the Han culture with the characteristics of the Manchu ethnicity.
4. The process of the sinicization of the Manchus can be seen from another perspective as a process for the rulers of the Qing dynasty to consolidate their rule. The rulers of the Qing dynasty studied the official system of the Ming dynasty politically, expanded the Eight Banners military system in the military, culturally respected the Cheng–Zhu school and Neo-Confucianism as the orthodoxy, and governed the country in ways other than Confucianism. It gradually settled local rebellions at all levels and established a dynasty which lasted for 268 years. This is inseparable from the absorption, learning and use of Chinese culture.
5. In general, the sinicization of Manchus expanded the cooperation of the Manchu ruling class and laid the foundation for the consolidation of the Qing dynasty. It also promoted the national integration with the Han nationality as the main body and maintained the unity of the multi-ethnic countries.

In summary, after long-term mixed living, mutual learning and intercommunication, the consistency of the production mode, class structure, language and customs between Manchu and Han increased, and the original differences became significantly reduced. After the middle period of the Qing dynasty, in the political, economic, cultural and other aspects, the Manchus have developed to a level that is socially equal to the Han ethnicity, and the relationship between the Manchu and Han nationalities became increasingly close. It can be said that the sinicization of Manchus is a two-way integration of the Manchu and Han ethnicities. This kind of integration promotes the development and prosperity of the two ethnic groups in politics, economy and culture.

== Sinicization of the Manchus in present day ==
After the Qing dynasty fell, many Manchus had assimilated and adopted Chinese customs. For example, the ruling emperors of the House of Aisin-Gioro would adopt the Han Chinese surname Jin (金) as both Jin and Aisin mean gold in their respective languages. One of the modern heads of the house is Jin Yuzhang.

Despite the past status of Manchu as a royal language, it is declining drastically and faces the risk of extinction. By the 1980s, there were only 2,000 Manchu speakers in the country.

The schools in China teaching minority languages consist of less than 5% of the education system. Currently, there are only two schools in China that can teach Manchu. Most Manchus today speak Mandarin.

== Criticism and debates ==
The New Qing History school criticizes the concept and argues that the Manchus were never fully sinicized during the Qing dynasty, especially at its peak era. In 1996, Evelyn Rawski, a prominent scholar of the school criticized the question of the "sinicization" of the Qing that had been raised by the Chinese-American historian Ping-ti Ho in his 1967 article "The Significance of the Ch'ing Period in Chinese History". In a response to Rawski's challenge, Ho Ping-ti ardently defended the sinicization thesis as he saw it, albeit in a very strong language. The term "New Qing History" appeared after this debate by the end of the 1990s. According to the school, from the 1630s at least through to the early 19th century, Qing emperors developed a sense of Manchu identity and used traditional Han Chinese culture and Confucian models to rule the core parts of the empire, while blending with Central Asian models from other ethnic groups across the vast realm.

Scholars debate the theory of the sinicization of the Manchus. Professor Yang Nianqun has tried to analyze the weaknesses of both the New Qing History and sinicization theory, in the hope to avoid a binary opposition between them. He prefers the term "Hua-ization" to "sinicization" by arguing that it represents a blending process of a diverse ethnic community. On the other hand, according to the scholar Yuanchong Wang, the mainstream explorations of the concept so far have focused either on how the Manchus were assimilated by the Han Chinese or on how they tried to preserve their ethnic identity. Rather, he used the term "sinicization" in a different sense in his work, in the hope to show how the Manchu regime, instead of the ethnic Manchus, promoted itself as the exclusively civilized Middle Kingdom or Zhongguo.

== See also ==
- Manchu people § History
- Cultural assimilation
- Eight Banners
- Five Races Under One Union
- Manchu people in Taiwan
- Manchukuo
- New Qing History
- Qing dynasty in Inner Asia
