= Legacy of the Qing dynasty =

Manchu-led dynasty of China (1644–1912)

As a Manchu-led imperial dynasty of China and an early modern empire in East Asia, the legacy of the Qing dynasty has been significant and enduring. As the last imperial dynasty in Chinese history, it is generally agreed that the Qing dynasty had major impact in China, laying the foundation for the modern Chinese state as a geographic and ethnic entity. Additionally, it had varying degrees of influence in surrounding countries (such as Russia and Mongolia) and other parts of the world.

== Overview ==
The Qing dynasty in 1911

The Qing dynasty (1644–1912) was the largest political entity ever to center itself on China as known today. Succeeding the Ming dynasty, the Qing dynasty more than doubled the geographical extent of the Ming dynasty, which it displaced in 1644, and also tripled the Ming population, reaching a size of about half a billion people in its last years. The vast majority of its large territory, together with its immense and expanding population as well as the associated problems, would be bequeathed to its successor states, the Republic of China and the People's Republic of China. For the Qing was many things, and the closing chapter of the 2000-year history of Imperial China was one of them.

During the Ming dynasty, the name "China" (中國; 中華) was generally understood to refer to the political realm of the Han Chinese, and this understanding persisted among the Han Chinese into the early Qing dynasty, and the understanding was also shared by Aisin Gioro rulers before the Ming-Qing transition. The Qing dynasty, however, "came to refer to their more expansive empire not only as the Great Qing but also, nearly interchangeably, as China" within a few decades of this development. Instead of the earlier (Ming) idea of an ethnic Han Chinese state, this new Qing China was a "self-consciously multi-ethnic state". Han Chinese scholars had some time to adapt this, but by the 19th century, the notion of China as a multinational state with new, significantly extended borders had become the standard terminology for Han Chinese writers. William T. Rowe noted that "these were the origins of the China we know today".

The immediate roots of the modern political term Zhonghua minzu (lit. 'Chinese nation') also lie in the Qing dynasty founded by the Manchus. While the dynasty assembled the territorial base for modern China, the 1727 Treaty of Kyakhta established the northern border of Mongolia (what was then part of the Qing-Russian border). Although the dynasty reached its peak during the High Qing era, it later ceded regions like Outer Manchuria (to Russia) and Taiwan (to Japan) following the Opium Wars and the First Sino-Japanese War. With the outbreak of the 1911 Revolution and the fall of the Qing dynasty, the Republic of China promoted the Five Races Under One Union principle, but the Mongols in Outer Mongolia declared their independence and established the Bogd Khanate of Mongolia in December 1911. Actual independence from the Republic of China was also achieved in 1921, and Mongolia (as a satellite state of the Soviet Union) joined the United Nations in 1961. Otherwise, China kept its territory intact as the Qing dynasty was transformed into a modern Chinese nation state.

== Historiography ==
The Confucian concept of the dynastic cycle was used by traditional Chinese historiography to organize China's past in terms of consecutive ruling houses that arose and collapsed. By the second half of the 20th century, the original Confucian historiography had lost favor in the West. Meanwhile, John King Fairbank of Harvard University, a historian who is essentially credited with founding modern Chinese history in the United States, steadfastly maintained a perspective that split the history of China's past half millennium around 1842. All that fell before remained part of "traditional China", and with the Western "shock" of the First Opium War and the resulting Treaty of Nanking, "modern China" was born. The Qing dynasty was thus bifurcated in this manner. In contemporary China, there is also a similar view for such a division.

Following China's defeat in the First Sino-Japanese War of 1894–1895 and the subsequent events including the scramble for concessions in the late 1890s, the idea of national humiliation became a focus of discussions among many Chinese writers and scholars with an atmosphere of Chinese nationalism, although they differed somewhat in their understandings of national humiliation. Ordinary scholars and constitutionalists also had different understanding of their home country from the anti-Qing revolutionaries during the period. The idea of national humiliation was also mentioned in textbooks of this period. Since the fall of the Qing dynasty the textbooks published by the Republic of China were often critical of the Qing dynasty, but they also differed significantly on their views regarding the Qing. During the Beiyang government period, the textbooks mainly criticized the Qing dynasty's autocratic rule from the "republican" standpoint; during the Nationalist government period however, the textbooks often criticized the ethnic oppression of the Manchu Qing dynasty from the Han standpoint. The "republican" standpoint during the Beiyang government period was related to the republican system in the early Republic of China, while the Han standpoint during the Nationalist government period was influenced by the Kuomintang's party-state system.

The idea of century of humiliation was developed based on the national humiliation narratives. While some have blamed the Qing rulers and administrators for China's weakness following the Opium Wars, other scholars have emphasized various positive aspects of the Qing dynasty, such as the economy before the Opium Wars, and a more favorable view has also emerged in popular culture. However, different views continued among Chinese people in the 21st century. Some have portrayed Imperial China (also known as the Celestial Empire) as more or less benevolent, as well as stronger and more advanced than the West. Although officially anti-imperialist and anti-feudalism, China's present leaders have often played on this popular sentiment to proclaim that their current policies serve to restore China's historical glory. In the meantime, however, a new form of Han nationalism has appeared among a considerable number of Chinese people, who tend to discredit the Qing and claim that the Ming-Qing transition represented an regression and mutation of Chinese civilization. According to them, the Ming dynasty was a dynasty of science and technology advancement with less restrictions from the emperors, while the Qing dynasty went towards the opposite side of civilization with its "dark cruelty", although such a view is rejected by others. On the other hand, scholars like American historian Peter C. Perdue have characterized the Qing as a colonial empire in the same league as the great powers of New Imperialism, while scholars like Yang Nianquan and Wu Qine have argued the characterization of Qing western expansion as "colonization" is an "over-interpretation" and pointed out that Chinese traditional imperialism differed from modern Western colonialism.

The New Qing History is a revisionist historiographical school that emerged in the mid-1990s and emphasizes the particular Manchu character of the dynasty. Earlier historians had emphasized a pattern of Han sinicization of various conquerors. In the 1980s and early 1990s, American scholars began learning the Manchu language, taking advantage of archival holdings in this and other non-Chinese languages that had long been held in Taipei and Beijing but had previously attracted little scholarly attention. In addition, a revitalized interest in the study of ethnicity led to a new understanding of non-Han peoples within Chinese politics and society, also forming part of a broader rethinking of how the Chinese nation-state developed. This research concluded that the Manchu rulers "manipulated" their subjects by fostering a sense of Manchu identity, often adopting Central Asian models of rule as much as Confucian ones. The most prominent feature of the studies has been characterised by a renewed interest in the Manchus and their relationship to China and Chinese culture, as well as that of other non-Han groups ruled by Beijing.

Chinese scholar Ding Yizhuang has actively worked cooperatively with some New Qing historians, notably Mark Elliott, a prominent scholar of the New Qing History school. As jointly pointed out by Ding Yizhuang and Mark Elliott, the most critical academic interest of these scholars has been to discover the Inner Asian dimension of Qing rule (with an emphasis on the Manchu ethnicity and identity), to better incorporate the use of non-Han historical evidence, especially Manchu-language documents, and to pay additional attention to the greater trends in global history, including attempts to re-examine the Qing history as one of the world empires. According to some New Qing historians, the Manchu rulers regarded Han China as merely a core part of a much wider empire that extended into Mongolia, Tibet, Manchuria and Xinjiang, as they argued that the Qing drew on both Chinese and Inner Asian political traditions, and that the Qing took difference for granted and used different methods of rule for different groups of subjects. Meanwhile, Mark Elliott emphasized that it is not the case that the school separated the Qing dynasty from China; instead, the school merely raised a question about the relationship between the two and encouraged studying the concept of "China" during the Qing dynasty, by carefully looking at the Qing archives and original materials in order to see how such concept and terminology were used and understood at that time.

Scholar Ping-ti Ho criticized this new approach for a perceived exaggeration of the dynasty's Manchu character, hewing towards the traditional position of sinicization, while scholars like Zhao Gang and Zhong Han have argued from the evidence (including the use of Manchu-language documents) that the Qing dynasty self-identified as China. Some Chinese scholars have accused the American group of scholars of projecting particular American conceptions of race and identity onto China in an unjustified manner. Others within China instead support these perspectives, seeing the scholarship as opening new vistas within the study of Qing history. Scholar Yuanchong Wang wrote that the mainstream explorations of the concept of "sinicization" have much focused on the Manchu ethnic identity. Rather, he used the term "sinicization" in a different sense, in the hope to show how the Manchu regime, instead of the ethnic Manchus, promoted itself as the exclusively civilized Middle Kingdom or Zhongguo. Inspired by New Qing History studies, the so-called "New Ming History" has emerged, which similarly attempts to draw attention to the Inner Asian characteristics of the preceding Ming dynasty.

== See also ==
- History of the Qing dynasty
- Names of the Qing dynasty
- Qing dynasty in Inner Asia

== Sources ==
- Rowe, William T. (2009). China's Last Empire: The Great Qing. History of Imperial China. Cambridge, MA: Harvard University Press. ISBN 978-0-674-03612-3.
- Waley-Cohen, Joanna (2004). "The New Qing History". Radical History Review. 88 (1): 193–206. doi:10.1215/01636545-2004-88-193. S2CID 144544216.
- Elliott, Mark (2001b), "The Manchu-language Archives of the Qing Dynasty and the Origins of the Palace Memorial System", Late Imperial China, 22 (1): 1–70, doi:10.1353/late.2001.0002, S2CID 144117089, archived from the original on 2 October 2022
