= History of Qing (People's Republic) =

Chinese official history started in 2002

The History of Qing (Chinese: 清史; pinyin: Qīngshǐ) is an unpublished official history of the Qing dynasty (1644–1912) sponsored by the government of the People's Republic of China (PRC) between 2002 and 2023. Since the abolition of the Qing in the 1911 Revolution and the establishment of the Republic of China (ROC), there have been several concerted attempts to write an official Qing history. These are informed by the previous long-standing tradition of each Chinese dynasty writing the history of its predecessor. An unfinished Republican-era manuscript had been assembled during the 1920s, but the effort that began in 2002 has since dwarfed every comparable effort in both length and organizational scale. The project has involved the work of hundreds of scholars and specialists under the supervision of the National Qing History Compilation Committee, chaired since its founding by leading historian Dai Yi (1926–2024).

A draft of the history was submitted for review in November 2018, a process originally expected to be completed by June 2019—but has reportedly ended with the manuscript being rejected in November 2023. Purportedly, this was due in large part to official discontent with the narrative presented by the draft, linked to long-standing opposition from the Chinese Communist Party to the New Qing History school. With the rejection, rumours began to surface that progress on the history had been indefinitely halted, after decades of work and billions of yuan had been spent on the project.

== Background ==
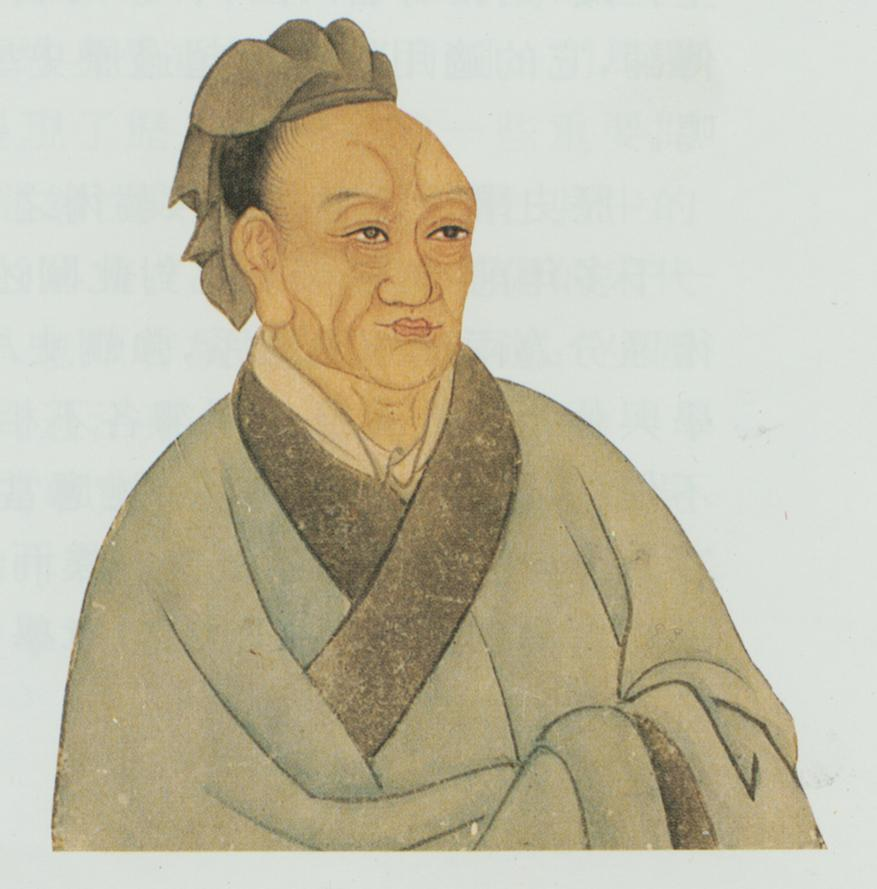
Sima Qian, the traditional father of Chinese historiography who wrote the first major dynastic histories

Beginning with the Records of the Grand Historian written by Sima Qian during the Han dynasty, there has existed a tradition of each Chinese dynasty compiling the official history of its predecessor. Following the overthrow of the Qing dynasty in the 1911 Revolution and the end of the dynastic system in China, the republican Beiyang government set up the Qing History Museum, which began drafting a history of the Qing in 1914. A draft of the history was ultimately published in 1928, but the effort ultimately went unfinished, with the collapse of the Republic and the onset of civil war and invasion by Imperial Japan. As published, the Draft History of Qing received considerable criticism from scholars, who noted numerous errors throughout the manuscript. (Note: A 1977 revised edition of the 1928 draft relates a preponderance of errors within the text.) After their retreat to Taiwan, the ROC government would attempt multiple times to complete the Draft History. In 1961, the ROC government published its own History of Qing, but this edition has not been widely accepted as the official Qing history because it is recognized that it was a rushed job motivated by political objectives, and it did not correct many of the errors known to exist in the Draft History.

After the Civil War ended in 1949 with the victory of the Chinese Communist Party (CCP) and the proclamation of the People's Republic of China, politician Dong Biwu submitted a proposal to resume drafting a Qing history, but the newly established government lacked sufficient resources to pursue the project at the time. In 1959, Premier Zhou Enlai instructed historian Wu Han, who at the time was deputy mayor of Beijing, to begin planning for a renewed compilation of the history, but this initiative was sidelined by the onset of the Great Leap Forward and accompanying Great Famine. In 1963, Chairman Mao Zedong invited historians, including Fan Wenlan, to again discuss plans for a Qing history. In 1965, the government formally instructed the Propaganda Department to begin planning: the Department met, and established a Qing History Compilation Committee composed of seven people: Guo Yingqiu, Yin Da, Guan Shanfu, Liu Danian, Tong Dong, Liu Daosheng, and Dai Yi. Additionally, an Institute of Qing History (IQH) was established at Renmin University of China (RUC). However, the outbreak of the Cultural Revolution once again put any historiographical efforts on hold.

After the end of the Cultural Revolution, the Institute of Qing History was reestablished at RUC. At the beginning of the 1980s, a letter was written to Deng Xiaoping that suggested the compilation effort be renewed, which he then forwarded to the Chinese Academy of Social Sciences (CASS)—but amid the slate of reforms during the Boluan Fanzheng period, this initiative was once again shelved. During the remainder of the 20th century, multi-volume monographs detailing Qing dynasty history were published. However, these were smaller projects, without the large-scale funding and organization required of a modern official history.

In 2001, Dai Yi and Li Wenhai—two leading historians at the IQH, the former of whom having sat on the 1965 committee—led a group of historians in once more calling on the government to sponsor a multi-volume Qing history. In August 2002, the CCP's Central Committee and State Council finally approved the research proposal to compile an official history of the Qing, and charged the Ministry of Culture to coordinate the project. On 12 December that year, the National Qing History Compilation Committee (国家清史编纂委员会; Guójiā qīngshǐ biānzuǎn wěiyuánhuì) was formally established, with Dai appointed as its director.

== Compilation ==
Following the committee's establishment in 2002, research began in earnest. By 2004, the history upon completion was projected to be over 32 million words in length, spanning 92 volumes. Due to the abundance of extant primary source material alone, organizational efforts have far exceeded those of any comparable historiographical effort.

At the end of 2012, Dai stated that 95% of the written material for the history had been put into place. On 1 January 2016, the overseas edition of People's Daily announced that the first draft—now reported as being 100 volumes and over 35 million words—had been completed, and review and revisions were now underway. By 2019, nearly 2 million historical documents had been digitized and assigned metadata, organized into a searchable database. These include historical newspapers, treaties, and financial instruments. Some of these documents have been presented alongside news of the history's compilation on the institute's official website.

== Form and style ==
By 2004, the organizational framework of the history had been roughly determined. Analogous to previous dynastic histories, the documents comprising the History of Qing would be organized by genre and scope, consisting of annals (通纪; tōngjì) chronicling the reigns of each emperor, and treatises (典志; diǎnzhì) detailing specific societal developments—in addition to biographies, tables, and illustrations. The prose was written according to a "new combined convention" (新综合; xīn zōnghé), wherein the annals were organized into chapters as would be familiar to an international audience, with the remainder written in a more classical, vignette-oriented style with shorter passages, reminiscent of the Twenty-Four Histories. The entire text uses written vernacular Chinese, as opposed to the Literary Chinese of its predecessors.

The annals form the core of the text, describing the historical background to the dynasty's rise, its 300-year-long reign, and ultimately its decline and fall. The treatises focus on various aspects of the Qing legal system and society, including astronomy, the calendar system, geography, demographics, the techniques of farmers and professionals, commerce, international trade, transportation, finance, autochthonous and Western academia, literature, opera, calligraphy, and painting. As of 2009, the work contained 22 volumes of biography, profiling over 3,000 individuals across every stratum of Qing society. The "catalog" (图录; túlù) represents an important innovation of the History of Qing. It comprises visual artefacts and illustrations, such as historical maps, paintings, and even photographs. These are classified into one of ten categories: geography, production, commerce and trade, military, folklore, architecture, art, religion, and portraiture.

== Criticism ==
From the Republican era onward, there has been consistent scholarly criticism of the notion of compiling an official Qing history in the pre-republican historiographical tradition. Some are opposed to any "official" history, either due to philosophical concerns, or for more pragmatic reasons, such as the potential monetary cost or organizational inefficiencies of such a project. A 2004 article from China Youth Daily also noted that the approach taken, whereby the government has "contracted" individual historians to work on the project, is not a reasonable mode of doing scholarship.

Chinese-American historian Yu Ying-shih opposed the oft-touted concept of "reworking history during prosperous times". Instead, he was convinced that the History of Qing, as well as the contemporaneous Xia–Shang–Zhou Chronology Project, only serve the political aims of the Chinese government. Additionally, he expressed concerns that these projects are too teleologically-oriented in their means and conclusions, as well as a belief that there were too few experts on Qing history in China sufficiently qualified to compile a high-quality history at such a scale.

=== Association with New Qing History ===
Broadly, the term New Qing History (NQH) refers to a body of recent scholarship that attempts to challenge or nuance what is considered to be the traditional narrative of the Qing dynasty—specifically, that while the Manchu were a non-Han ethnic group, their success was linked to their comprehensive sinicization after founding the Qing. By contrast, NQH is commonly characterized as emphasizing an "Inner Asian" or "multilateral" perspective regarding the Qing and Chinese political history as a whole. Its works frequently question the nature of sinicization, the extent to which it occurred, or whether it was an inevitable phenomenon. This approach is understood as originating outside of China, specifically in US scholarship during the 1980s. The dialogue between scholars Evelyn S. Rawski and Ping-ti Ho during the late 1990s is often characterized as the beginning of the larger debate over NQH as such. In a 1998 response to a speech Rawski made as President of the Association for Asian Studies—a position he had himself held during the 1970s—Ho laid out one of his points of emphasis as such:

Although the way in which great European sinologists and philologists generalized about the inevitability of the sinicization of China's alien conquerors may appear a bit simplistic today, there can be no gainsaying their general assessment of the basic strength of Chinese civilization, in terms of level of achievement and richness of content, vis-a-vis others in the Eastern and Northeastern Asian world in historic times. Cumulative international research on China during the past century seems to have, by and large, affirmed rather than refuted their assessment. A fair and objective reassessment is found in the general editors' preface to The Cambridge History of China (1978):

The history of Chinese civilization is more extensive and complex than that of any single Western nation, and only slightly less ramified than the European civilization as a whole.

The old sinologists' view sounds trite, but truths and near-truths often sound trite.

In addition, critique of NQH scholarship by domestic commentators is often rooted in an association with the propaganda efforts undertaken by the Japanese Empire in the early 20th century. Imperial Japanese propaganda often emphasized a distinction between "China proper" and "Manchuria", a term that only became widespread in English after its adaptation from Japanese-language publications. This propaganda effort was instrumental in the prelude to the Japanese invasion of Manchuria and subsequent establishment of the puppet state of Manchukuo in northeastern China. While the strongest resistance to the phenomenon has come from within China and Taiwan, many domestic scholars, such as Ding Yizhuang, are sceptical of the rejection of NQH, and many defend or consider themselves party to the movement and its scholarship. The History of Qing project has thus involved scholars with diverse positions regarding the questions posed by NQH. Wu Guo notes the role NQH has played in the project's "attention [paid] to the multi-ethnic character of the Qing as a conquest dynasty, its territorial expansion, as well as the importance of the Manchu-language sources."

=== Halting ===
However, due to the PRC government having variously portrayed first the ROC, and subsequently itself as successor states to the Qing, the PRC has paid considerable attention to controlling the perception of Qing history. In its latter years, amid a shifting political climate officials began to grow more concerned with the output of the project. In 2019, People's Daily, the official newspaper of the Central Committee of the Chinese Communist Party, ran an opinion piece by Zhou Qun, the executive deputy editor of the academic journal "Historical Research" (历史研究; Lìshǐ yánjiū), entitled "Firmly grasp the right to speak in Qing history research", which emphasized the great importance of the history of the Qing dynasty for contemporary China, but intoned that recent scholarly publications regarding the Qing were "far from meeting the needs of the party and the people". In 2020, the journal "Historical Review" (历史评论; Lìshǐ pínglùn) was established, which has been characterized as emphasizing historical perspectives conducive to the Chinese government position.

In November 2023, Taisu Zhang, a professor at Yale Law School specializing in legal history, stated that he had learned the manuscript ultimately failed to pass political review due to being "too influenced by" what has been termed "foreign New Qing History". Zhang considered the association made between the project as a whole and NQH as being unwarranted, because many scholars working on the project were vocal opponents of the movement.

After having chaired the project since 2002, Dai Yi died in January 2024. Following the 2023 review failure, the Chinese Communist Party (CCP) has requested that historians make changes to the tome to better align with Xi Jinping's vision for the future. According to Mark Elliot, a prominent historian of the NQH school, "though the project was always going to be scholarship in service to politics, the scholarship still came first. Now politics comes first and the chapters they have are useless to them."

== See also ==
- History of the Qing dynasty
- Xia–Shang–Zhou Chronology Project
