= New Qing History =

School of thought on the history of the Qing dynasty

- Traditional Chinese: 新清史學派
- Simplified Chinese: 新清史学派
Transcriptions
Standard Mandarin
- Hanyu Pinyin: Xīnqīngshǐ Xuépài

The New Qing History (sometimes abbreviated as NQH) is a historiographical school of thought that emerged in the United States in the mid-1990s by offering a revisionist account of the Manchu-led Qing dynasty of China.

== Overview ==
The Qing dynasty was not founded by the Han people, but by the Manchus. While orthodox historians tend to emphasize the power of the Han people to "sinicize" their conquerors in their thought and institutions, a handful of American scholars began to learn Manchu in the 1980s and early 1990s and took advantage of archival holdings in this and other non-Chinese languages that had long been held in Taipei and Beijing but had previously attracted little scholarly attention to gain new insight onto the Qing as a state founded by a people who did not initially see themselves as "Chinese" and were originally perceived by Han elites as "barbarians". This research provided a new, arguably more emic, perspective on Qing rule, which found that the Manchu rulers were savvy in manipulating the image of the dynasty and adjusting their claims to legitimacy differentially according to the expectations of various subject populations. From the 1630s at least through to the early 19th century, emperors developed a sense of Manchu identity and used traditional Han Chinese culture and Confucian models to rule the core parts of the empire, while blending with Central Asian models from other ethnic groups across the vast realm.

According to some scholars, at the height of their power, the Qing regarded China proper, that is, the territory taken over from the Ming, as only a part, although a very important part, of a much wider empire that extended into the Inner Asian territories of Mongolia, Tibet, Manchuria and Xinjiang, as they argued that the Qing drew on both Chinese and Inner Asian political traditions, and that the Qing took difference for granted and used different methods of rule for different groups of subjects. Meanwhile, according to Mark Elliott, a prominent scholar of the New Qing History school, it is not the case that the New Qing History separates the Qing dynasty from China. Instead, the school simply raised a question about the relationship between the Qing dynasty and "China" — with the word "China" in inverted commas because the concept of "China" has been changing, not fixed. The school hoped to understand the concept of "China" during the Qing dynasty, and how it was used during the period, which is a question worth studying, but did not hold that Qing dynasty is not China.

Some scholars like Ping-ti Ho have criticized the approach for exaggerating the Manchu character of the dynasty, while scholars like Zhao Gang have argued from the evidence that the Qing dynasty self-identified as China. Some Chinese scholars accuse the American historians in the group of imposing American concerns with race and identity or even of imperialist misunderstanding to weaken China. Still others in China agree that this scholarship has opened new vistas for the study of Qing history. Inspired by New Qing History studies, the so-called "New Ming History" studies have also emerged, which similarly attempts to draw attention to the Inner Asian characteristics of the preceding Ming dynasty, and illustrates the existence of such characteristics in Chinese dynasties before the Qing dynasty.

The use of "New Qing History" as an approach is to be distinguished from the unpublished multi-volume history of the Qing dynasty that the State Council of the People's Republic of China sponsored between 2002 and 2023, which is also occasionally called "New Qing History" in English. Nevertheless, this state project, a revision of the 1928 Draft History of Qing, was said to be written primarily to refute the New Qing History. In November 2023, Taisu Zhang, a professor at Yale Law School specializing in legal history, stated that he had learned the manuscript ultimately failed to pass political review due to being "too influenced by" what has been termed "foreign New Qing History", even while many working on project were vocal opponents of the movement. Due to this, Zhang considered the association made between the project as a whole and New Qing History as being unwarranted.

== Origins ==
The origins of the New Qing History lie in Inner Asian Studies. A Harvard historian, Joseph Fletcher, studied the languages and culture of Central Asia. He was among those to discredit the idea that nearly all Manchu documents were translations from Chinese and that they would add little to the record. He wrote in 1981, "Qing scholars who want to do first-class work in the archives must, from now on, learn Manchu and routinely compare the Manchu and Chinese sources for their topics of research." Beatrice Bartlett, a Yale historian who had studied Manchu with Fletcher, reported in an article, 'Books of Revelation', that the archives in Taiwan and Beijing revealed many secrets, which required knowledge of Manchu.

The Grand Council of the Yongzheng emperor, for instance, operated only in Manchu until the 1730s, and many other important edicts and memorials did not have Chinese translations. Official use of Manchu, she argued, did not decline during the 19th century. She concluded that the archives of Manchu materials were more likely to be complete, as they were less likely to have been raided, weeded or lost. According to Mark Elliot, while the renascence of interest in Manchu studies among historians in the United States was not so much shaped by the inspiration of foreign scholarship, Japanese researchers have been at the forefront of studying the Qing as a Manchu dynasty, as well as the territories of Inner Asia, using non-Chinese texts and concentrating on Manchu materials.

The New Qing History took on distinct form in the mid-1990s. In 1993, scholars Pamela Kyle Crossley and Evelyn Rawski summarized the arguments for using Manchu-language materials, which they and others had explored in the newly opened archives in Beijing and were beginning to use in their publications. Evelyn Rawski's presidential address, "Re-envisioning the Qing: The Significance of the Qing Period in Chinese History," at the annual meeting of the Association for Asian Studies in 1996, particularly criticized the question of the "sinicization" of the Qing that had been raised by Ping-ti Ho in his 1967 article "The Significance of the Ch'ing Period in Chinese History." Rawski's thought was based on a Manchu-centric concept of history and indicated that the reason the Qing rulers could successfully govern China for nearly 300 years was not the result of sinicization, adopting the characteristics of Han Chinese rule and culture, but by their focus on retaining the characteristics of Manchu culture. They used such characteristics to strengthen relations with other nationalities to build a multiracial empire that included Manchu, Han, Mongol, Tibetan, Uyghur and other nationalities. For better governing his multiethnic empire, for instance, the Kangxi emperor located his summer residence in the Chengde Mountain Resort, north of the Great Wall. That became the historical core of city of Chengde, which the Qianlong emperor enlarged considerably, including a replica of the Potala Palace in Lhasa.

In response, Ping-ti Ho published "In Defense of Sinicization: A Rebuttal of Evelyn Rawski's 'Re-envisioning the Qing'". He argued that the pattern of Chinese history was for a conquest dynasty to adopt Chinese ways of rule and culture and attacked Rawski for Manchu-centrism. The school that is now known as the "New Qing History" developed after the debate. Historian Huang Pei later published a monograph that developed the objections stated by Ho Ping-ti.

According to academic Guo Wu of Allegheny College, the skepticism of Eurocentrism, as part of the Counter-Enlightenment, post-modern discourse, thus resulted in a similar skepticism of one-way and linear cultural assimilation and political unification. Similar internalization and skepticism of specific given values were initially experienced by many New Qing historians, who ultimately shared a number of tenets. Additionally, the claim of Manchu uniqueness was a postmodern intellectual endeavor to pinpoint "difference and heterogeneity in postindustrial Western societies."

== Views ==
Prominent scholars who have been associated with the New Qing History, including Evelyn Rawski, Mark Elliott, Pamela Kyle Crossley, Laura Hostetler, Peter C. Perdue, Philippe Forêt, Edward Rhoads, and others, despite differing among themselves on important points, represent an "Inner Asian" and "Eurasian" turn. The most prominent feature of the studies has been characterized by a renewed interest in the Manchus and their relationship to China and Chinese culture, as well as that of other non-Han tribes ruled by Beijing. In general, New Qing historians date the founding of the empire from 1636, when the dynasty was proclaimed, rather than from 1644, when the Qing took control of the Ming capital Beijing. They argued that "Manchu" identity was deliberately created only after the takeover of China and that the new racial identity was important but "fungible", easily exchanged for others. The first rulers of the dynasty played the Confucian role of Son of Heaven but at the same time, often behind the backs of their ethnic Han ministers, adopted other roles to rule other ethnic groups, including Bogda Khan for the Mongols and the wheel-turning king for Tibetan Buddhists.

Edward Rhoads argued that the Manchus' integration into Han culture should be viewed as a reciprocal acculturation process. He further claimed that the Manchu identity was actually reinforced in the last decade of the dynasty. Meanwhile, Mark Elliott highlighted the significance of both ethnic divergence and acculturation, contending that the Manchu rulers' "acculturation" and "differentiation" were essential to the accomplishment of their prolonged rule of the empire. According to him, although the Manchus were acculturated, they were never fully integrated into Chinese society. He approached the Manchu elites' rule in China using ethnicity as an analytical framework, contending that although the cultural gap between Manchus and Han Chinese had shrunk, ethnic boundaries still existed and that embracing Chinese institutions did not equate to "becoming Chinese" in a theoretical sense. These scholars tend to use the term "acculturation", which simply means cultural modification and adaptation.

Some New Qing historians deconstructed the concept of sinicization and approached the Qing as an Inner Asian rather than Chinese empire. They argued that the Qing saw itself as a Manchu or a universal empire, a multi-national polity, which with Han China as only the most central and economically important component, and the multi-faceted Qing ruler presented himself differently to different groups of his subjects. On the other hand, according to Mark Elliott, New Qing historians merely raised a question about the relationship between the Qing dynasty and "China" and encouraged studying the concept of "China" during the Qing dynasty, by carefully looking at the Qing archives and original materials in order to see how such concept and terminology were used and understood at that time. This does not contend that the Qing dynasty is not China.

The military expansion of frontiers were sometimes expensive and drained resources from the rest of China. Some New Qing historians have argued that the Manchu-ruled Qing was more comparable to the Ottoman, Mughal, and Romanov (Russian) Empires across the Eurasian landmass than most earlier Chinese dynasties. They argued that the Qing Empire was not only a victim of imperialism but also practiced imperialism itself. For example, Peter C. Perdue had described the Qing as a "colonial empire" that ruled over a collection of peoples and deserves comparison with other contemporary empires, whereas traditionalist historians reject the comparison of Imperial China to imperialist powers. Some of the New Qing historians followed Evelyn Rawski calling the Qing "Early Modern", rather than "late imperial", on the grounds that the Manchus created a centralized empire (with a much larger territory and population) that the Ming could not have created.

Chinese scholar Ding Yizhuang has actively worked cooperatively with some New Qing historians. According to her, the school proposed to look at how Manchu rulers attempted to preserve the Manchu ethnic identity during the entire Qing history and examine the achievements and shortcomings of Manchu rule in China from a Manchu perspective. Ding Yizhuang and Mark Elliott together pointed out that the most critical academic propositions of the New Qing History are the following:

1. Discovers the Inner Asian dimension under Manchu rule, with an emphasis on the Manchu ethnicity and identity
2. Advocates the use of non-Chinese historical materials, especially Manchu-language documents, which are believed to represent a distinctive Manchu political and intellectual world
3. Pays attention to the context of global history, which reexamines the Qing history as one of the world empires

== Developments ==
Several important works developed the main ideas of the school, although there are also differences among the scholars in the loose group. Scholar Pamela Kyle Crossley, who is usually listed as a member of the school, observed its two tendencies: one is Manchu Studies, and the other is the study of the Qing as an empire. At the same time, Crossley argued that the label "New Qing History" may have overlooked the different approaches among the scholars involved.

For example, Evelyn Rawski's Re-envisioning the Qing: The Significance of the Qing Period in Chinese History in 1996 regarded the Qing as a Manchu empire, with China being only one part. Nevertheless, Crossley sees the empire not as a Manchu empire but as a "simultaneous" system in which the rulership is not subordinate to the Chinese or any other single culture, which she termed "culturally null" in her work A Translucent Mirror: History and Identity in Qing Imperial Ideology. She criticized the new "Manchu-centered" school for romanticism and a reliance upon disproved theories about "Altaic" language and history, but she seems to include herself in the Qing empire school, which she calls "Qing Studies." Mark Elliott states that while he agrees with such views to some extent, because he thinks it helps to make people more acutely aware that the Qing Empire and the Republic of China (or the People's Republic of China) are different political entities with different political goals, but he admits that he also worries about drawing too sharp a line between Qing dynasty and China. He wrote that it was under the Qing that "China" transformed into a definition of referring to lands where the "state claimed sovereignty", rather than only the territories inhabited by the people of the Central Plains (or the Han Chinese) by the end of the 18th century. Evelyn Rawski also wrote in 2015 that while the term Zhongguo (i.e. China) was "never part of the formal name of a Chinese state until the twentieth century", the Manchus who founded the Qing dynasty succeeded in expanding the meaning of Zhongguo (China) to encompass the territories of the Qing empire, thus "creating the foundation for the modern concept".

There is a trend of sidestepping the sinicization thesis among New Qing historians. For example, the book Empire at the Margins: Culture, Ethnicity, and Frontier in Early Modern China by Crossley et al. explicitly stated that "our first task is to avoid the once common assumptions of 'sinicization', or 'sinification', an established notion already challenged by several case studies and interpretative essays." For them, the main problem of the narrative of sinicization was the reduction of Chinese history into "assimilation in a single direction" combined with "convergences of and divergences from heterogeneous sources". They essentially considered the sinicization paradigm Han-centric. In his work China Marches West: The Qing Conquest of Central Euroasia, Peter Perdue offered his rebuttal to Ho's sinicization thesis by raising two main points, including the separateness of the Manchu elite and Han mass, and the difference and non-uniformity among the subject population. On the other hand, scholar Yang Nianqun tried to analyze the weaknesses of both the New Qing History and sinicization theory, in the hope to avoid a binary opposition between them. He prefers the term "Hua-ization" to "sinicization" by arguing that it represents a blending process of a diverse ethnic community.

American historian Richard J. Smith reported that an interpretive "middle ground" had emerged between the views of Rawski and Crossley, on one hand, and Ho and Huang, on the other. Smith indicated that based on the idea that "Qing empire" and "China" might not be the same thing the Qing had to be placed in a context that included Inner Asia in general and that saw China in a global field. The less "sinocentric" view, Smith continued, which placed less emphasis on "sinicization", had won over most China scholars in the West (and increasingly also in China), in spite of debates over "matters of degree." According to him, a "Chinese" face was presented to Han Chinese subjects by the pragmatic Qing emperors, while different ethnic faces were presented to the various non-Han subjects (including Manchus, Mongols and Tibetans) in other regions of their expansive multicultural empire. Nevertheless, he pointed out "China proper" (often designated 内地 meaning "inner territory" in Chinese) refers to the core eighteenth provinces of the Qing dynasty, but from a Manchu perspective, however, the concept of “China” (Chinese: Zhongguo; Manchu: Dulimbai Gurun) embraced the entire empire, including Manchuria, Mongolia, Xinjiang, and Tibet.

According to Guo Wu, the New Qing History encompasses a number of viewpoints and presumptions influenced by postmodern history. These have led to a number of important concerns, including the definitions of China and Zhongguo, the character of the Qing dynasty, the meaning of imperialism, and assimilation vs acculturation. Due to its deconstruction of several concepts including the modern Chinese master narrative of nation-building, the debate has thus become somewhat emotional and politicized given China's strong sense of victimization and vulnerability. He argued that a de-politicized and unbiased analysis of the New Qing History reveals its contributions to the field of China studies, including its generation of debates of the sinicization theory and heated debates about what China (Zhongguo) and Chinese (Zhongguoren) meant in history. He also noted that while it is arguable that "sinicization" is a descriptive term for a historical event that occurs in specific times and settings with various causes, the thesis may not be viewed as a static and unidirectional concept of Chinese ethnogenesis. He added that Chinese scholars contributed to refining the definition of China from Chinese perspectives in reaction to the somewhat overly radical approach of some New Qing historians, who have attempted, wittingly or unwittingly, to reduce "China" (Zhongguo) to China proper and "Chinese" (Zhongguoren) to the Han people.

== Inspired studies ==
The New Qing History inspired scholarly studies on a number of points, notably the concept of "China" during the Qing dynasty, and the Inner Asian characteristics of the Han Chinese dynasties like the preceding Ming dynasty, along with some other points.

=== The concept of "China" ===
Scholar Zhao Gang used both Manchu and Han sources to interrogate the relationship between Qing and "China". He pointed out the Qing court's creative reinterpretation of the concept of "China" (中國, Zhongguo) as a composite of Han and non-Han peoples in the empire, and that China proper and Han people (漢人) were not synonymous with "China" (Zhongguo) under the Qing view. While earlier Han Chinese dynasties (like the Ming dynasty) used Zhongguo to refer only to Han areas, the Qing dynasty reinvented the definition of Zhongguo to refer to non-Han areas of the empire as well. Zhao Gang cited Qing documents used the Manchu term "Dulimbai Gurun" (a direct translation of Zhongguo; "Middle Kingdom") in Manchu texts and Zhongguo in Chinese texts to refer to the entire Qing including Manchuria, Xinjiang, Mongolia, and Tibet as "China", in official documents, edicts, treaties, in texts like the Treaty of Nerchinsk, the Convention of Kyakhta (1768), a 1755 pronouncement by the Qianlong Emperor, a Manchu language memorial on the conquest of Dzungaria, and other Qing documents. (Note: Other documents include for example Qianlong's arguments for the annexation of Xinjiang and Qianlong's sinicization policies in parts of Xinjiang, in addition to various treaties signed by the Qing dynasty.) According to Zhao, the Qing emperors accepted their own Chinese identity, but it was not passive assimilation, as they actively changed old China from a Han-centered cultural notion to a multi-ethnic political entity. In other words, Manchu rulers gave a new meaning to the word "China" while becoming Chinese.

William T. Rowe wrote that the name "China" (Zhongguo or Zhonghua) was apparently understood to refer to the political realm of the Han Chinese during the Ming dynasty, and this understanding persisted among the Han Chinese into the early Qing dynasty, and the understanding was also shared by Aisin Gioro rulers before the Ming-Qing transition. The Qing, however, "came to refer to their more expansive empire not only as the Great Qing but also, nearly interchangeably, as China" within a few decades of this development. Instead of the earlier (Ming) idea of an ethnic Han Chinese state, this new Qing China was a "self-consciously multi-ethnic state". Han Chinese scholars had some time to adapt this, but by the 19th century, the notion of China as a multinational state with new, significantly extended borders had become the standard terminology for Han Chinese writers. Rowe noted that "these were the origins of the China we know today". He added that while the early Qing rulers viewed themselves as multi-hatted emperors who ruled several nationalities "separately but simultaneously", by the mid-19th century the Qing Empire had become part of a European-style community of sovereign states and entered into a series of treaties with the West, and such treaties and documents consistently referred to Qing rulers as the "Emperor of China" and his administration as the "Government of China".

Joseph W. Esherick observes that while the Qing Emperors governed frontier non-Han areas in a different, separate system under the Lifan Yuan and kept them separate from Han areas and administration, it was the Manchu Qing Emperors who expanded the definition of Zhongguo (中國) and made it "flexible" by using that term to refer to the entire empire. For example, the English version of the 1842 Treaty of Nanking and 1858 Treaty of Tientsin refers to "His Majesty the Emperor of China" while the Chinese refers both to "The Great Qing Emperor" (Da Qing Huangdi) and to Zhongguo as well. Similarly, Elena Barabantseva has also noted that the Manchu referred to all subjects of the Qing empire regardless of ethnicity as "Chinese", and they used the term Zhongguo as a synonym for the entire Qing empire but used "Hanren" to refer only to the core area of the empire, with the entire empire viewed as multiethnic.

Scholar Yang Nianquan attempted to interpret the origins of the Zhongguo concept, and contended that the concept had a long history of combining many groups, which was contradictory to the Hua–Yi distinction ideology. He wrote that the Qing rulers' viewpoint was constrained by this inclusive cultural Zhongguo, which had a longer history dating back to the Han dynasty, making it unattainable and reluctant for them to create an independent worldview focused on Inner Asia. Scholar Guo Chengkang wrote that when the Qing established its control in inland China following the Ming-Qing transition, the emperors inherited all the Ming lands and people, and in the meantime the concept of Zhongguo was also expanded to encompass Inner Asian regions such as Manchuria. He added that the Qing emperors were able to reinterpret the concept of China by claiming their own Chineseness because Zhongguo was a fluid term.

Scholar Emma Teng argued that the previous Ming's view of empire was a clear cultural and geographical demarcation between civilized Chinese and surrounding "barbarians". Due to Qing's territorial expansion well beyond Ming borders, a different conception of empire is needed, but Qing rulers may regard this differently. For example, the Yongzheng Emperor conceived of the Qing as a singular empire which blurred ethnic lines under a civilizing mission, whereas the Qianlong Emperor promoted the ideology of "Five Nations Under Heaven", where the Han Chinese, Manchu, Mongols, Tibetans and Hui Muslims were distinct domains or constituent nations/blocs under the umbrella of the Qing empire. According to Teng, the Qing would only truly become a Chinese empire during the Tongzhi Restoration in the second half of the 19th century when the threat of foreign imperialism threatened the territorial integrity of the empire's frontier areas, with for instance massive Han Chinese immigration and colonization of frontier regions and the extension of Chinese-style administrative structures.

Russian scholar Sergius L. Kuzmin wrote that despite the Qing dynasty's usage of the term "China" to refer to the entire empire, empires centered on China (including conquest dynasties like the Yuan and Qing) were known officially by their respective dynastic name (e.g. "Great Yuan" and "Great Qing", respectively). Non-Han peoples considered themselves as subjects of these empires and did not necessarily equate them to "China". This resulted from different ways of their legitimization for different peoples in these dynasties. Qing emperors were referred to as "Khagan of China" (or "Chinese khagan") by their Turkic Muslim subjects (now known as the Uyghurs), as "Bogda Khan" or "(Manchu) Emperor" by their Mongol subjects, and as "Emperor of China" (or "Chinese Emperor") and "the Great Emperor" (or "Great Emperor Manjushri") by their Tibetan subjects, such as in the 1856 Treaty of Thapathali. It is pointed out that Tibetan subjects traditionally regarded the Qing as Chinese, unlike the Yuan which was founded by Mongols.

Scholar Yuanchong Wang wrote that the mainstream explorations of the concept of "sinicization" have much focused on the Manchu ethnic identity. Rather, he used the term "sinicization" in a different sense, in the hope to show how the Manchu regime, instead of the ethnic Manchus, promoted itself as the exclusively civilized Middle Kingdom or Zhongguo. According to him, the Qing's depiction of itself as a Chinese empire was not hindered by the imperial house's Manchu ethnicity, especially after 1644, when the name "Chinese" took on a multiethnic meaning. Scholar Hui Wang noted that the recognition of the Qing dynasty as China by neighbouring dynasties and European states was also accompanied by the Qing's conscious effort to position itself as a Chinese dynasty and to inherit Chinese dynasties' role in the world.

=== New Ming History ===
Inspired by New Qing History studies, the name "New Ming History" has also appeared which refers to the emerging Ming-centred studies that give emphasis on the Inner Asian characteristics under the rule of the preceding Ming dynasty. It has been pointed out that examining the history of a dynasty from the Inner Asian perspective is also applicable to dynasties established by the Han Chinese, including the Ming dynasty (and earlier dynasties), rather than being exclusive to dynasties established by non-Han people like the Qing dynasty.

Early Ming emperors sought to project themselves as "universal rulers" to various peoples such as Central Asian Muslims, Tibetans, and Mongols. The Yongle Emperor cited Emperor Taizong of Tang as a model for being familiar with both China and the steppe people. Like the Qing emperors, the Ming emperors also had an important influence on Tibetan Buddhism, although they had some differences in terms of territorial expansions. It is noted that the Yongle Emperor had promoted the idea that he was the earthly manifestation of Manjushri and styled himself the wheel-turning king after the fall of the Mongol-led Yuan dynasty. With the exceptions of the Jiajing Emperor and Chongzhen Emperor, all emperors of the Ming dynasty were actually enthusiastic about the practice and propagation of Tibetan Buddhism. Some scholars pointed out that even up to the early years of the Shunzhi Emperor, the first Qing emperor to rule over China proper, some non-Han followers of the Tibetan Buddhism still regarded Ming emperors as the incarnation of Manjushri, and only after this the Qing emperors replaced the Ming emperors as the incarnation of Manjushri for them.

Some scholars have also argued that the Ming regarded "China" (Zhongguo) as only a part of the Ming empire and as an ethnocultural space (rather than a political entity), challenging the prevalent perceptions of the Ming. In essence, during the Ming dynasty "China" was defined as the domain of the Han Chinese inhabited by the Han people (漢人), where Han Chinese ideals were created, upheld, and practiced in contrast to those of non-Han "barbarians", whether they were domestic or foreign; the dynastic title “Great Ming” should not be confused with "China", the ethnocultural space. Other scholars pointed out that the Ming dynasty used the term "China" politically to refer to the entire country but culturally to refer to only Han areas of the empire.

=== Other points ===
Tibetologist Melvyn Goldstein had used the term "passive hegemony" to describe the relationship between Qing China and Tibet, although he believed it was apparent that the Qing intended to "control" Tibet as a dependency to serve its dynastic goals.

The New Qing History, according to Tristan G. Brown, writing in 2011, did not explore the example of Islam and Muslims to test their argument that the early Qing emperors aspired to be universal monarchs. Brown finds that an inscription by the Qianlong emperor showed that he wanted to incorporate both Xinjiang and Islam into his empire and that this inscription, along with the "inventive structural duality of Chinese-Islamic architecture with Central Asian Turkish-Islamic architectural forms," makes the "most compelling case" that New Qing History is also applicable to Islam in China.

Mario Cams wrote in 2016 that two decades after the debate between Evelyn Rawski and Ho Ping-ti, it is very evident that the New Qing History controversy is far from resolved and still serves as a source of inspiration for the development of new arguments in addition to the existing discussions and debates.

== Criticism ==
=== Academic ===
There is disagreement on whether or to what degree Manchu rulers used new forms of imperial ritual to display new forms of empire, or if they continued rituals from the Ming dynasty to show that they saw themselves as heirs of a Han Chinese empire. In 2015, Roger Des Forges' review of David M. Robinson's Martial Spectacles of the Ming Court criticized scholars of conquest dynasties and New Qing History for using the "Royal hunt" as a differentiating factor between Han Chinese and non-Han dynasties. He noted that the martial themed Ming dynasty "Grand Review" was copied by the Qing and disagreed with those who sought to present it as a Qing feature. Des Forges praised Robinson for not using certain Ming and Qing emperors to contrast their differences, for not conflating the terms "Han" and "Chinese" unlike New Qing historians, and for not translating the term "Zhongguo".

In 2016, scholar Yang Nianquan observed that some New Qing historians tended to place the Qing in the context of world history and interpret it using empire building theory; however, he argued that Peter Perdue's study of the Qing expansion to the Northwest frontier as "colonization" is an "over-interpretation" and an inaccurate analogy between Chinese history of unification and European colonial experiences. Although many scholars agree that the Qing constituted an 'empire' and should be examined as such, scholar Wu Qine argued that Chinese traditional imperialism differed from modern Western colonialism.

In 2021, academic Guo Wu stated in an op-ed piece published by Lianhe Zaobao that some Chinese scholars interpret the New Qing History as reflecting either a "Cold War mentality" or a "hostile imperialist stance" toward China. In their view, American sinology has long been shaped by practical and political concerns, and after the dissolution of the Soviet Union, parts of the American academic establishment began developing theoretical frameworks that could support the possible fragmentation of China. He wrote that such disputes have also revealed cultural contrasts between China and the United States.

There are active scholarly communications and academic criticisms of the New Qing History in mainland China and Taiwan. Chinese scholars like Li Aiyong and Zhang Jian pointed out the various ways in which the word "sinicization" can be understood and identified the limitations of using Manchu ethnicity and language to make an argument against the sinicization thesis. Zhang Jian argued that the definition of "sinicization" as adopted by the New Qing historians was "too narrow", which also produced a conflict where none existed, specifically between Manchu ethnic identity and correct understanding of Manchu sinicization. She also argued that the New Qing History was wrong to ignore class conflicts in favour of an ethnic focus. In 2021, Liu Wenming also argued that New Qing History's premise that Qing was an 'empire' in the western use of the term (which he argued was itself poorly defined) led to an excessive focus on a supposed "Manchu-Han contradiction" and concepts of expansion, conquest and settlement.

Zhong Han, a Chinese scholar and researcher of Manchu and early Qing history, argued in 2021 that the concept of "simultaneous emperorship" is incoherent, and charges the school with putting politics in the way of scholarship. Zhong argues against the characterization of the Qing as a Western-style colonial empire, and against the non-identity of the Qing and China. In support of the latter argument, he follows the school in employing sources in non-Chinese language, but concludes that these affirm the Qing's self-identification with China rather than refute it.

In 2022, Nagatomi Hirayama described both Chinese nationalist historians and historians of the New Qing History as being in "pursuit of different historical realities in their excessive obsessions over the 'China' (or not) discourses". He stated that Mark Elliot, a NQH historian, showed no concern for China as a "historical reality" and addressed concerns about NQH only in ways which defends the NQH approach to history, making communication with his Chinese nationalist counterparts impossible. Hirayama described the result as the emergence of different camps of historians engaged in political struggles to assert discursive hegemony but not historical realities. For example, academic Li Zhiting of Renmin University of China characterizes NQH as a type of imperialist history corresponding with US foreign policies while Evelyn S. Rawski describes NQH as a treatment for Chinese nationalist history. According to Ding Yizhuang and Elliot, the purpose of the NQH is to offer multiple historical perspectives, but Hirayama argues that even if this is true, the practical effect is the deconstruction of China as a cohesive historical and cultural entity.

In 2025, Hirayama described new Qing history as part of a movement for "decolonizing Chinese history" that also included the Rawski-Ho debate, new Xinjiang history, and new Hong Kong and Taiwan studies. He compared these studies and their niche in establishing different national histories to the way the PRC's uses "partial historical realities" for nation-building, stating that like the PRC state, the movement "takes a substantial political role for the established global imperium". Rather than decolonizing Chinese history, Hirayama accused historians of the movement such as James A. Millward of "recolonizing" Chinese history in service of modern politics in the West, especially in the United States. Hirayama argues that in practice, the actual political effect of the movement is to portray China as possessing the same colonial baggage as the West but without the "modern democracy and civility that the West is proud to spread".

In 2026, Tsinghua University scholar Yao Dali defended New Qing History in a back-and-forth with Wong Young-tsu, accusing the latter of "completely denying" its valuable research results. Wong contended that no one would completely deny it but that he had pointed out its fundamental flaws in denying sinicization altogether rather than comprehensively examining it.

=== Chinese government criticism ===
New Qing History has come under government criticism in China, which has intensified during the general secretaryship of Xi Jinping. In 2015, Chinese Social Sciences Today, an official journal of the state-affiliated Chinese Academy of Social Sciences, published an article by Li Zhiting, a scholar working on the National Qing History Compilation Committee and affiliated with Renmin University of China, that charged that "'New Qing History' is academically absurd, and politically does damage to the unity of China...." He sought to "expose its mask of pseudo-academic scholarship, eliminating the deleterious effect it has had on scholarship in China." Li accused several North American historians of "maliciously" distorting history in order to "split China" and argued that they "view the history of China from an imperialist standpoint, with imperialist points of view and imperialist eyes, regarding 'traditional' China as an 'empire', regarding the Qing dynasty as 'Qing dynasty imperialism'."

In 2019, the People's Daily, the official newspaper of the Central Committee of the Chinese Communist Party, accused the New Qing History of "bringing foreign historical nihilism as a theoretical variant into Qing historical research in China." In 2025, the Zhejiang Provincial Committee of the Chinese Communist Party warned that anti-Qing sentiment, particularly the 1644 historical view, on Chinese social media risks creating an opening for so-called "hostile foreign forces" to promote the New Qing History. In 2026, United Front Work Department (UFWD) published a series of articles attacking New Qing History, calling it a "political plot" and a "theory weapon" by "separatist forces." The same year, the UFWD's China News Service published an article titled "New Qing History Seriously Erodes the Historical Foundations of the Chinese Nation."

== See also ==
- Sinicization of the Manchus
- Later Jin (1616–1636)
- Conquest dynasty
- Qing dynasty in Inner Asia
- Names of the Qing dynasty
- Legacy of the Qing dynasty
- Debate on the Chineseness of the Yuan and Qing dynasties

== Major works ==
- Pamela K. Crossley, A Translucent Mirror: History and Identity in Qing Imperial Ideology. Berkeley: University of California Press, 1999.
- Mark C. Elliott, The Manchu Way: The Eight Banners and Ethnic Identity in Late Imperial China. Stanford: Stanford University Press, 2001.
- Laura Hostetler, Qing Colonial Enterprise: Ethnography and Cartography in Early Modern China. Chicago: University of Chicago Press, 2001.
- James A. Millward, Ruth W. Dunnell, Mark C. Elliott, and Philippe Forêt (eds.), New Qing Imperial History: The Making of Inner Asian Empire at Qing Chengde. London: Routledge, 2004.
- James A. Millward, Beyond the Pass: Economy, Ethnicity, and Empire in Qing Central Asia, 1759-1864. Stanford, CA: Stanford University Press, 1998.
- Peter C. Perdue, China Marches West: The Qing Conquest of Central Eurasia. Cambridge: Harvard University Press, 2005.
- Evelyn S. Rawski, The Last Emperors: A Social History of Qing Imperial Institutions. Berkeley: University of California Press, 1998.
