= Tartar Chinese =

Tartar Chinese may refer to:

- Tartar Chinese Empire, a colloquial name for the Qing (Manchu) dynasty of China
- Tartar Chinese language, a term for the Mandarin Chinese lingua franca of late-Qing-dynasty Peking

== See also ==
- Chinese Tatars, a Turkic ethnic group in Xinjiang
