= Rawski (surname) =

Rawski (Polish feminine: Rawska; plural: Rawscy) is a surname. Notable people with this surname include:

- Evelyn Rawski (born 1939), American sinologist
- Krystyna Czajkowska-Rawska (born 1936), Polish volleyball player and coach
