= Draft History of Qing =

Unfinished official history of the Qing dynasty

The Draft History of Qing (Chinese: 清史稿; pinyin: Qīngshǐ gǎo) is a draft of the official history of the Qing dynasty compiled and written by a team of over 100 historians led by Zhao Erxun who were hired by the Beiyang government of the Republic of China. The draft was published in 1928, but the Chinese Civil War caused a lack of funding for the project and it was put to an end in 1930. The two sides of the Chinese civil war, the People's Republic of China and Republic of China have attempted to complete it.

== History ==
China has a tradition of official history compilation, through which new dynasties justified their legally constituted authority by narrating the history of the preceding dynasty.

The Qing imperial court had previously established a Bureau of State Historiography that pre-compiled its own dynastic history.

The massive book was started in 1914, and the rough copy was finished in about 1927.

1,100 copies of the book were published. The Beiyang government moved 400 of the original draft into the northern provinces, where it re-edited the content twice, thus creating three different versions of the book.

It was banned by the Nationalist Government in 1930. The ban was never officially lifted. No further work was actually tried until 1960 in Taiwan and 2000 in PRC. This was partly due to continued warfare including the Second Sino-Japanese War (1937–1945). According to historian Hsi-yuan Chen, further work was discouraged by the obsolescence of the Imperial Chinese conceptions of political legitimacy and historiography, which the making of an "official history" inherently assumed.

== Contents ==
The draft contains 529 volumes. It attempts to follow the form of previous official histories, and is organized into four sections:

- Annals (纪; 記; jì), chronicling the reigns of emperors
- Treatises (志; zhì), detailing specific events
- Tables (表; biǎo), containing lists of important people in important posts or royal lineages
- Biographies (传; 傳; zhuàn), written about notable or representative people.

== Shortcomings ==
Because of the lack of funding, the authors were forced to publish quickly, and consequently this project was never finished, remaining in the draft stage. In rushing to publication, the authors were motivated by the political instability of the period. The authors openly acknowledged their rush, and admitted there may have been factual or superficial errors.

The draft was later criticized for being biased against the Xinhai Revolution. Notably, it does not have records of historical figures in the revolution, even those that had been born before the end of the Qing dynasty, although it includes biographies of various others who were born after the collapse of the Qing dynasty. The historians, who were Qing loyalists and/or sympathizers, had a tendency to villainize the revolutionaries. In fact, the draft completely avoided the use of the Republic of China calendar, which was unacceptable for an official history meant to endorse the rise of a new regime.

== Modern attempts ==
In 1961, to commemorate the 50th anniversary of the declaration of the Republic of China, the Republic of China government in Taiwan published its own History of Qing, added 21 supplementary chapters to the Draft History of Qing and revised many existing chapters to denounce the Chinese Communist Party (CCP) as an illegitimate, impostor regime. It also removed the passages that were derogatory towards the Xinhai Revolution. This edition has not been accepted as the official History of Qing because it is recognized that it was a rushed job published for political purposes. Neither does it correct most of the many errors known to exist in the Draft History of Qing.

An additional project, attempting to actually write a New History of Qing incorporating new materials and improvements in historiography, lasted from 1988 to 2000 and published only 33 chapters out of the over 500 projected. The New History was abandoned because of the rise of the Pan-Green Coalition, which saw Taiwan as a separate entity from China and therefore not as the new Chinese regime that would be responsible for writing the official history of the previous dynasty.

In 1961, the People's Republic of China also attempted to complete writing the history of the Qing dynasty, but the historians were prevented from doing so by the Cultural Revolution which started in 1966.

In 2002, the PRC once again announced that it would complete the History of Qing. The project was approved in 2003, and put under the leadership of historian Dai Yi. Initially planned to be completed in 10 years, the completion of the first draft was later pushed to 2016. Chinese Social Sciences Today reported in April 2020 that the project's results were being reviewed. The draft was rejected in November 2023, apparently because of official discontent with the narrative it presented and the influence of the so-called New Qing History school. Following the 2023 review failure, the CCP has requested historians make changes to the tome to better align with Xi Jinping's vision for the future. According to Mark Elliot, a prominent historian of the NQH school, "though the project was always going to be scholarship in service to politics, the scholarship still came first. Now politics comes first and the chapters they have are useless to them."

== See also ==
- Twenty-Four Histories
- History of the Qing dynasty
