= Laura Hostetler =

American historian

Laura Hostetler is a professor in the Department of History in the University of Illinois Chicago. Her principal research interests are the history of cartography, empire, and encounters between Europe and Asia. She belongs to the school of thought known as the New Qing History. Her book, Qing Colonial Enterprise: Ethnography and Cartography in Early Modern China, demonstrates how the Qing dynasty pursued its imperial ambitions by using cartography and ethnography.

In 1995 she received her Ph.D. in the Department of Asian and Middle Eastern Studies at University of Pennsylvania, where she studied with Susan Naquin.

From 2010 to 2014, Hostetler was the Chair of the UIC Department of History.

Hostetler is also a Council Member for the American Historical Association.

== Publications ==
- Qing Colonial Enterprise: Ethnography and Cartography in Early Modern China, University of Chicago Press, 2001.
- The Art of Ethnography: A Miao Album of Guizhou Province, University of Washington Press, 2005.
