= Names of the Qing dynasty =

Names for the Qing dynasty

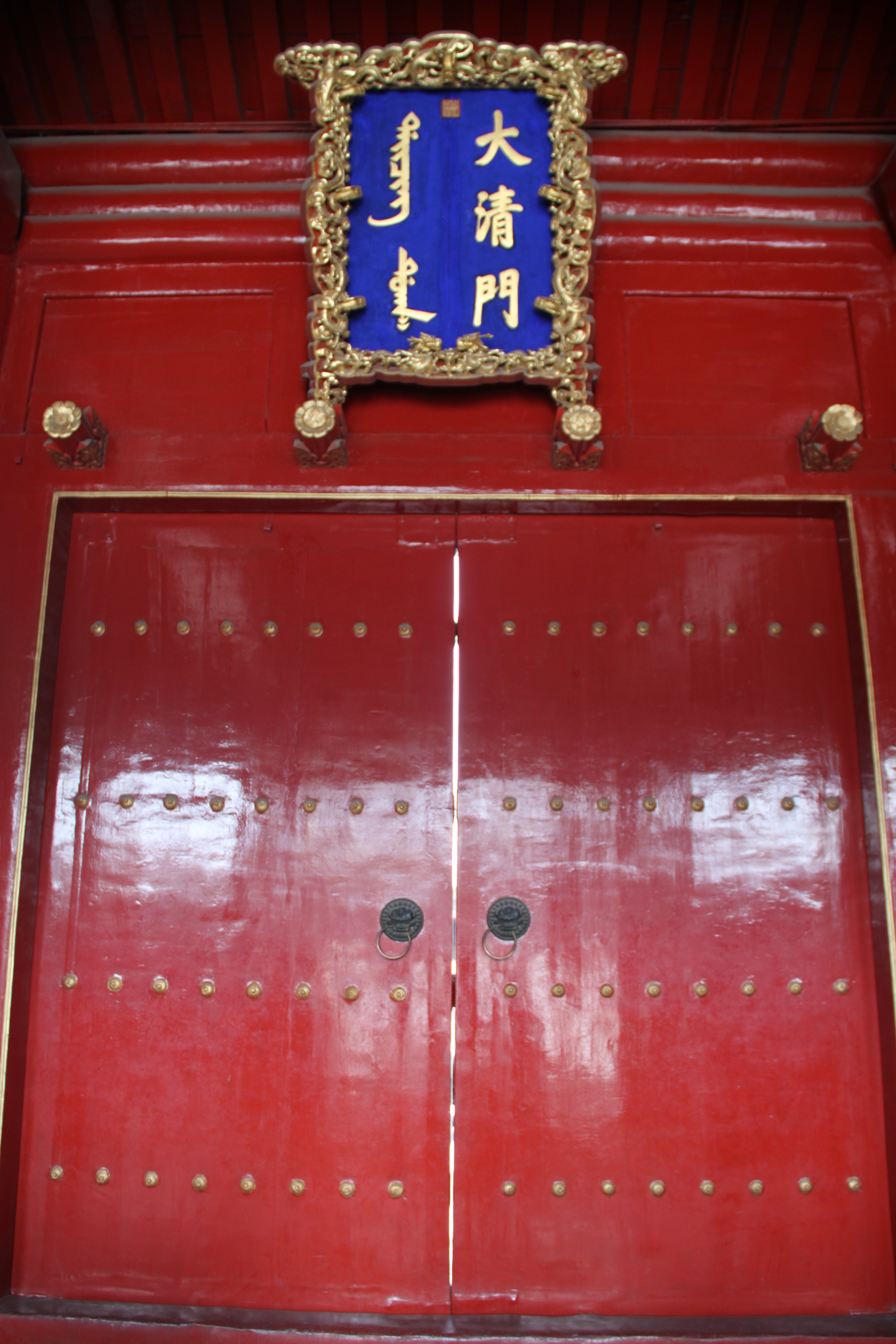
The Daqing Gate in Mukden Palace, displaying both Manchu and Chinese characters

The Qing dynasty (English: /tʃɪŋ/) was an imperial Chinese dynasty ruled by the Aisin Gioro clan of Manchu ethnicity. Officially known as the Great Qing, the dynastic empire was also widely known in English as China and the Chinese Empire both during its existence, especially internationally, and after the fall of the dynasty.

== Earlier names ==
Later Jin

Chinese name
- Traditional Chinese: 後金國
- Simplified Chinese: 后金国
- Literal meaning: Later Gold State
Transcriptions
Standard Mandarin
- Hanyu Pinyin: Hòu Jīn Guó
- Wade–Giles: Hou^{4} Chin^{1} Kuo^{2}
Yue: Cantonese
- Jyutping: hau^{6} gam^{1} gwok^{3}

Manchu name
- Manchu script: ᠠᠮᠠᡤᠠ ᠠᠶᡳᠰᡳᠨ ᡤᡠᡵᡠᠨ
- Romanization: Amaga Aisin Gurun

In 1616 Nurhaci declared himself the "Bright Khan" of the Later Jin state (Chinese: 後金國; pinyin: Hòu Jīn Guó; lit. 'Later Gold State'; Jurchen/Manchu: Amaga Aisin gurun) in honor both of the 12–13th century Jurchen-led Jin dynasty and of his Aisin Gioro clan (Aisin being Manchu for the Chinese 金 (jīn, "gold")). The dynasty became known as the Later Jin dynasty by historians. His son Hong Taiji renamed the dynasty Great Qing in 1636, sometimes referred to as the Predynastic Qing. In 1644 the Shunzhi Emperor established the dynastic capital in Beijing and was enthroned in the Forbidden City shortly after the fall of the Ming dynasty (1368–1644). The Qing dynasty completely conquered the Ming dynasty's rump regimes (collectively known as the Southern Ming) by 1662.

== Origin of the name Qing ==
Great Qing

Chinese name
- Traditional Chinese: 大淸
- Simplified Chinese: 大清
Transcriptions
Standard Mandarin
- Hanyu Pinyin: Dà Qīng
- Wade–Giles: Ta^{2} Ch'ing^{1}
Yue: Cantonese
- Jyutping: daai^{6} cing^{1}

Manchu name
- Manchu script: ᡩᠠᠶᡳᠴᡳᠩ ᡤᡠᡵᡠᠨ
- Romanization: Daicing Gurun

The name Great Qing first appeared in 1636. Since there was no official explanation from the Qing government about the origin of the name, there are competing explanations on the meaning of Qīng (lit. "clear" or "pure"). The name may have been selected in reaction to the name of the Ming dynasty (大明 or Great Ming), whereas the character 明 is composed of elements "sun" (日) and "moon" (月), both associated with the fire element of the Chinese zodiacal system. The character Qīng (清) is composed of "water" (氵) and "azure" (青), both associated with the water element. This association would justify the Qing conquest as defeat of fire by water. The water imagery of the new name may also have had Buddhist overtones of perspicacity and enlightenment and connections with the Bodhisattva Manjusri. Alternatively, Great Qing may come from ancient Chinese text Guanzi, which included clauses like "鏡大清者，視乎大明" and "鑑於大清，視於大明", whereas "Great Qing" (大清) referred to the sky and "Great Ming" (大明) referred to the Sun and Moon, with the sky covering the Sun and Moon. "Qing" is also the name of several rivers in Manchuria, at one of which Nurhaci won a key battle in 1619. Also, in its Manchu pronunciation, Daicing is a near homonym with the Mongol word daicin, meaning "militant" or "warlike".

== The name China for the Qing ==
Central State

Chinese name
- Traditional Chinese: 中國
- Simplified Chinese: 中国
Transcriptions
Standard Mandarin
- Hanyu Pinyin: Zhōngguó
- Wade–Giles: Chung^{1}-kuo^{2}
Yue: Cantonese
- Jyutping: zung^{1} gwok^{3}

Manchu name
- Manchu script: ᡩᡠᠯᡳᠮᠪᠠᠶ ᡤᡠᡵᡠᠨ
- Romanization: Dulimbai Gurun

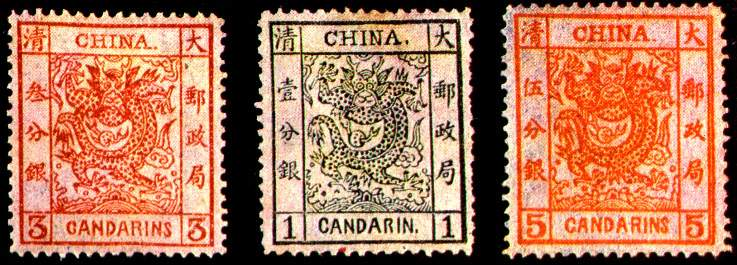
Qing postal stamps released in 1878

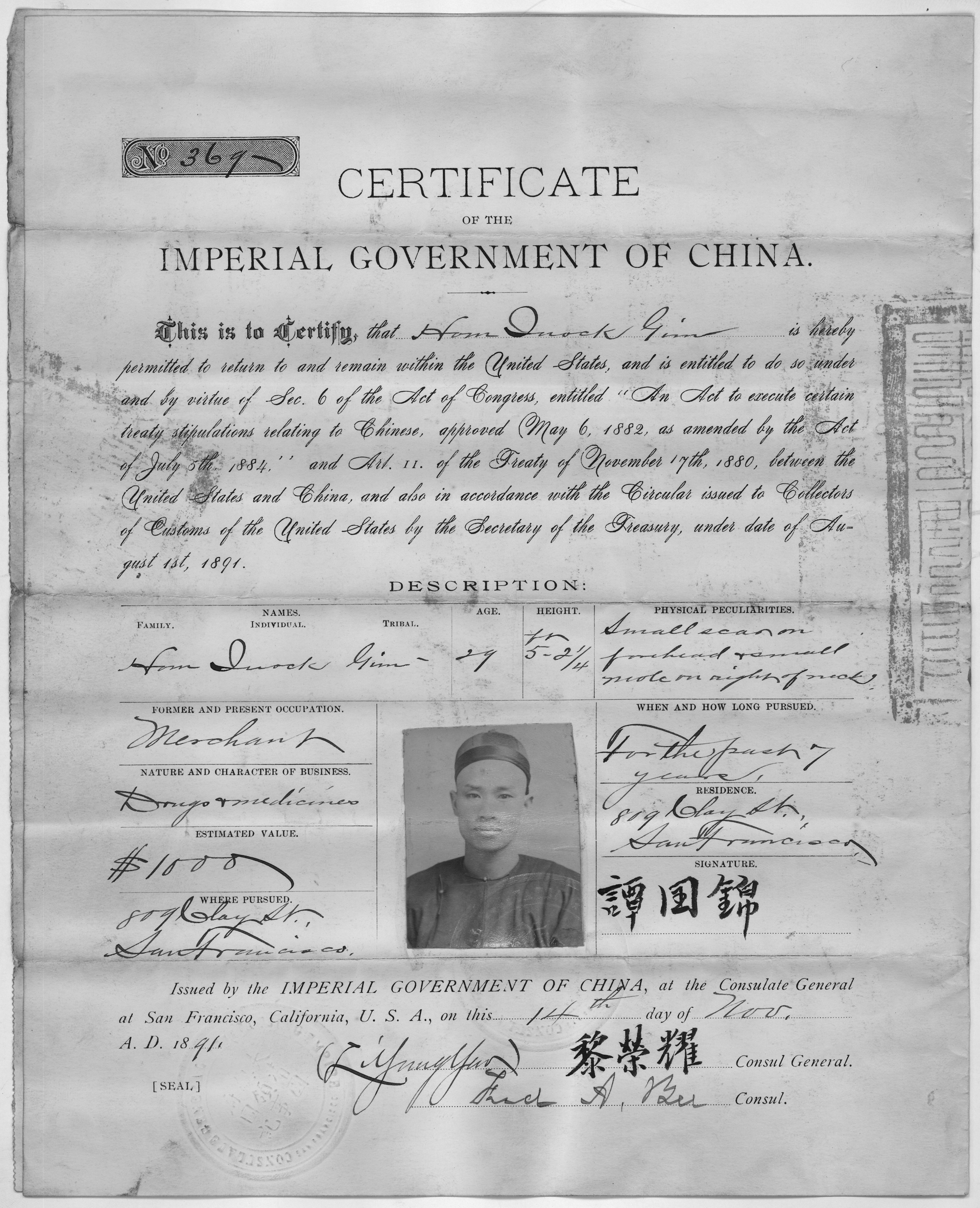
Certificate of the Imperial Government of China issued by the Consulate General of Qing China at San Francisco in 1891

The Qing dynasty was not founded by the Han people, but by the Manchus. Since its time the Qing became widely known internationally in English as "China" or the "Chinese Empire", with China being the standard English translation of Zhongguo or Dulimbai Gurun. They were commonly used in for instance international communications and treaties in addition to English-language mass media and newspapers etc. during the Qing period.

While orthodox historians tend to emphasize the power of the Han people to "sinicize" their conquerors in their thought and institutions, scholars of the New Qing History tend to deconstruct the concept of "sinicization" and attempt to approach the Qing as an Inner Asian rather than Chinese empire, arguing that the Qing drew on both Chinese and Inner Asian political traditions. In response, scholar Zhang Jian pointed out the various ways in which the word "sinicization" can be understood. Scholar Yuanchong Wang emphasized that instead of focusing on the Manchu ethnic identity for the concept of "sinicization", he used the term "sinicization" in a different sense, in the hope to show how the Manchu regime, instead of the ethnic Manchus, promoted itself as the exclusively civilized Middle Kingdom or Zhongguo. He wrote that the Qing's depiction of itself as a Chinese empire was not hindered by the imperial house's Manchu ethnicity, especially after 1644, when the name "Chinese" took on a multiethnic meaning. Scholar Hui Wang noted that the recognition of the Qing dynasty as China by neighbouring dynasties and European states was also accompanied by the Qing's conscious effort to position itself as a Chinese dynasty and to inherit Chinese dynasties' role in the world.

Scholar Zhao Gang pointed out that the Qing emperors accepted their own Chinese identity, but it was not passive assimilation, as they actively changed old China from a Han-centered cultural notion to a multi-ethnic political entity; in other words, Manchu rulers gave a new meaning to the word "China" while becoming Chinese. After conquering China proper, the Manchus commonly called their state Zhongguo (Chinese: 中國; pinyin: Zhōngguó, lit. "middle state", the name for China), and referred to it as Dulimbai Gurun in Manchu (lit. "central state", from Chinese Zhongguo). The emperors equated the lands of the Qing state (including present day Northeast China, Xinjiang, Mongolia, Tibet and other areas) as Zhongguo (Dulimbai Gurun) in both the Chinese and Manchu languages, defining China as a multi-ethnic state, and rejecting the idea that Zhongguo only meant Han areas. The Qing emperors proclaimed that both Han and non-Han peoples were part of Zhongguo. They used both "Zhongguo" and "Great Qing" to refer to their state in official documents. "Chinese language" (Dulimbai gurun i bithe) included Chinese, Manchu, and Mongolian languages, and "Chinese people" (Chinese: 中國之人; pinyin: Zhōngguó zhī rén; Manchu: Dulimbai gurun i niyalma) referred to all subjects of the empire.

When the Qing conquered Dzungaria in 1759, they proclaimed that the new land was absorbed into "China" (Dulimbai Gurun) in a Manchu-language memorial. The Manchu-language version of the Convention of Kyakhta (1768), a treaty with the Russian Empire concerning criminal jurisdiction over bandits, referred to people from the Qing as "people from the Central Kingdom" (Dulimbai gurun i niyalma, i.e. "Chinese people" in Manchu). The Qing also established legations and consulates known as the "Chinese Legation", "Imperial Consulate of China", "Imperial Chinese Consulate (General)" or similar names in various countries with diplomatic relations, such as in the United Kingdom (or British Empire) and the United States. Both English and Chinese terms such as "China" and "Zhongguo" were frequently used by Qing consulates and legations there to refer to the Qing state during their diplomatic correspondences with foreign states. The English name "China" was also used domestically by the Qing, such as in its officially released stamps since Qing set up a modern postal system in 1878. The postal stamps (known as 大龍郵票 in Chinese) had a design of a large dragon in the centre, surrounded by a boxed frame with a bilingual inscription of "CHINA" (corresponding to the Great Qing Empire in Chinese) and the local denomination "CANDARINS".

By the early 20th century, various textbooks with the names "Chinese geography" (中國地理) and "Chinese history" (中國歷史) as approved by the Qing's Board of Education had emerged for educational purposes. For example, Chinese geography textbooks published in the period gave detailed descriptions of China's regional position and territorial space. The Qing dynasty created the first Chinese nationality law in 1909, which defined a Chinese national (Chinese: 中國國籍; pinyin: Zhōngguó Guójí) as any person born to a Chinese father. Children born to a Chinese mother inherited her nationality only if the father was stateless or had unknown nationality status. Jus sanguinis was chosen to define Chinese nationality so that the Qing could counter foreign claims on overseas Chinese populations and maintain the perpetual allegiance of its subjects living abroad through paternal lineage. A Chinese word called xuètǒng (血統), which means "bloodline" as a literal translation, is used to explain the descent relationship that would characterize someone as being of Chinese descent, and therefore, eligible under the Qing laws and beyond, for Chinese citizenship.

== List of names in English ==
=== Alternative names in English ===
China
As a general term for the country. Applied to the Qing dynasty since the early Qing period.
Chinese Empire
As a general term for the imperial state. Applied to the Qing dynasty since the early Qing period.
Central State, or Middle Kingdom
Translation of Chinese: 中國, as a general term for the country. Applied to the Qing dynasty since the early Qing period.
Qing Empire, Ching Empire, or Ch'ing Empire
Mostly used when specifically referring to the empire. The three spellings (Qing, Ching, Ch'ing) are various romanizations for the same sound (English: /tʃɪŋ/).
Empire of the Great Qing
Translation of Chinese: 大清帝國.
Great Qing
Translation of Chinese: 大清, the official name in Chinese.
Great Qing state
Translation of Chinese: 大清國 or Manchu:ᡩᠠᡳᠴᡳᠩ
ᡤᡠᡵᡠᠨ
Manchu dynasty
Used by some westerners, similar to the name "Mongol dynasty" for the Yuan dynasty. Sometimes written as "Manchu Dynasty of China".
Manchu empire
Used by some westerners (including some New Qing History scholars). Alternatively (and historically) rendered as "Manchoo empire" or "Mantchoo empire" in the 19th century. Also written as "Manchu empire of China". Additional names such as "Manchu Qing dynasty" or "Manchu Qing empire" are used for emphasizing the Manchuness of the Qing dynasty.

=== Historical names or romanizations officially used during the Qing dynasty in English ===
Ta Ching
The transliteration of Chinese: 大清 as appeared in the banknotes of the Ta Ching Government Bank during the late Qing dynasty, based on the Wade-Giles romanisation Ta^{4}-ch'ing^{1}.
Tai Ching Ti Kuo
The transliteration of Chinese: 大清帝國 as appeared in the Great Qing Copper Coin during the late Qing dynasty, based on the Wade-Giles romanisation Ta^{4}-ch'ing^{1}-ti^{4}-kuo^{2}.
Ta Tsing Empire
Appeared in certain treaties in English (signed with the United States) during the late Qing dynasty, using a transliteration based on the Postal romanisation system for the Chinese part.
China
Appeared in most treaties, official documents, postal stamps etc.
Chinese Empire
Appeared in international treaties in English.
Empire of China
Appeared in certain treaties in English.

=== Other (unofficial) historical names in English ===
Cathay
An alternative name for China as appeared in some English-language publications. The term was used in Marco Polo's book on his travels in the 13th century (during the Yuan dynasty), and it took a while for most Europeans to be convinced that Cathay referred to China or North China. This English term was sometimes used, although increasingly only in a poetic sense, until the 19th century, when it was completely replaced by "China".
Celestial Empire
The translation of Chinese: 天朝 (a name for China) as appeared in North American and Australian mass media in the 19th century, in reference to the status of the Emperor of China as the Son of Heaven in the Sinosphere.
Magnificent Kingdom
The (literal) translation of Chinese: 華國 Translated from Chinese: 中華國 as "Middle Magnificent Kingdom", "Central Magnificent Kingdom", or "Central Magnificent State" during the 19th century. Another translation, as quoted in certain English publications in the same period, "flowery": 華 might be incorrect. Magnificent is a literal translation. "Flowery" might be mistaken for a word 花 pronounced hua(1) first tone versus 華 / 华 hua(2) second tone. (华 is the simplified Chinese character). There is no reason to call China a "flowery" country and in fact it sounds flippant. Today, the Taiwanese call their country 中华民国, and China call themselves 中华人民共和国. It is unlikely they call themselves a "flowery" state which sounds flippant.
Tartar Chinese Empire
Appeared in some English publications in the 19th century. Also rendered as "Chinese-Tartar empire" or simply "Chinese empire".
Tartar Chinese dynasty
Appeared in some English publications in the 19th century, or simply "Tartar dynasty (of China)" or "Chinese dynasty".
Manchu Tartar dynasty
Appeared in some English publications in the 19th century. Also rendered as "Manchoo Tartar dynasty","Mantchoo Tartar dynasty", "Tartar-Manchu dynasty", "Tartar-Mantchoo dynasty", or simply "Manchu dynasty", "Manchoo dynasty" or "Mantchoo dynasty".
Tsing dynasty
Appeared in some English publications in the 19th century, using a transliteration based on the Postal romanisation system. Sometimes rendered as "Ching dynasty" or "Ch'ing dynasty", based on the Wade-Giles romanisation for 清, Ch'ing^{1}.
Ta-tsing dynasty
Appeared in some English publications in the 19th century, using a transliteration based on the Postal romanisation system. Also referred to as the "Tai-tsing dynasty", "Great Tsing dynasty", or as the "Ta Ching dynasty" or "Ta Ch'ing dynasty", from the Wade-Giles romanisation of 大清, Ta^{4}-ch'ing^{1}.
Great Pure dynasty
Appeared in certain English publications in the 19th century, with "Great Pure" being a translation of the Chinese:大清.

== Native language names within the Qing dynasty and contexts ==
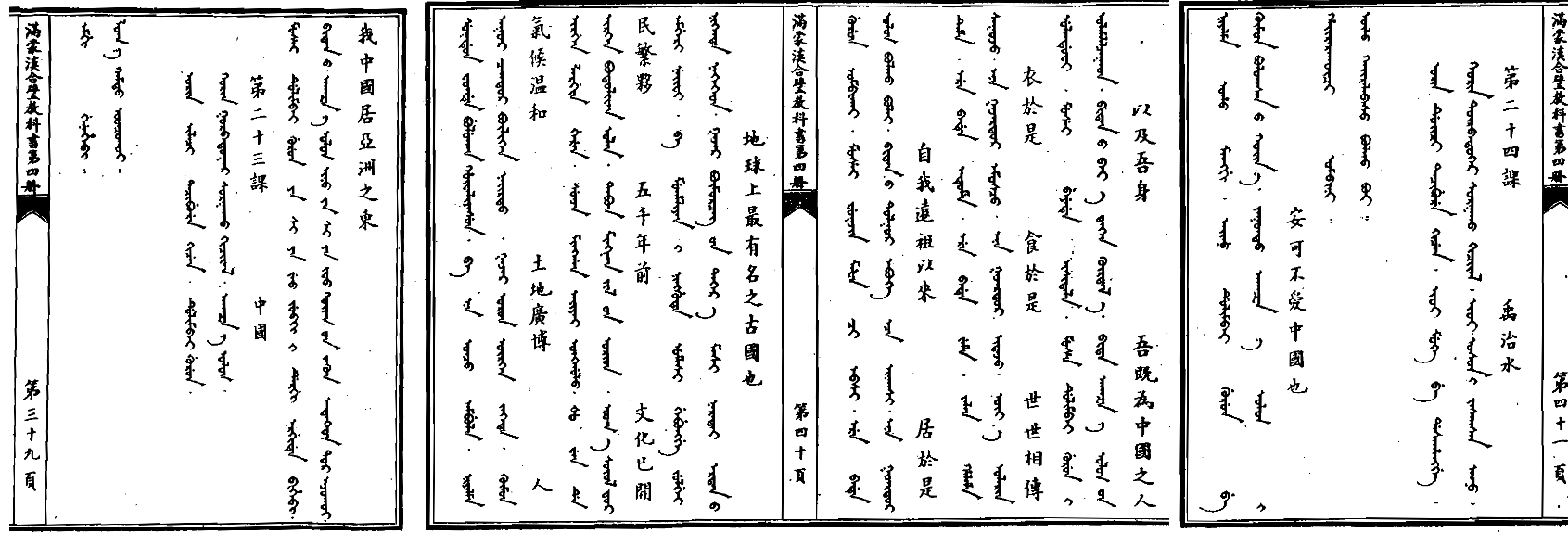
Chapter China (中國) of "The Manchurian, Mongolian and Han Chinese Trilingual Textbook" (滿蒙漢三語合璧教科書) published in Qing dynasty: "Our country China is located in East Asia... For 5000 years, culture flourished (in the land of China)... Since we are Chinese, how can we not love China."

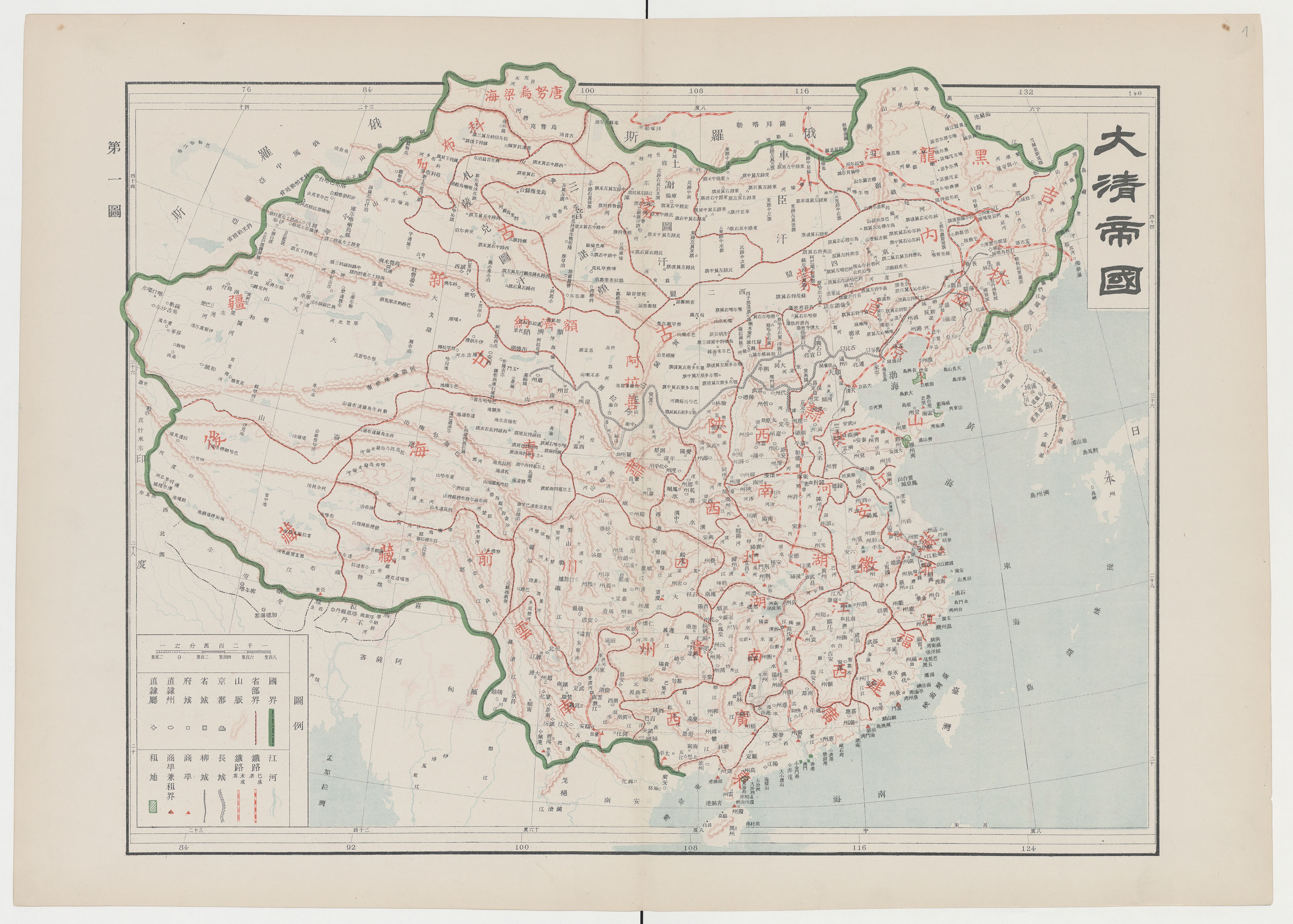
Official map of the empire published by the Qing dynasty in 1905.

The Qing dynasty was founded by the Manchu people, a Tungusic people who conquered the Ming dynasty, and by the 18th century it had extended its control into Inner Asia. During the Qing period languages like Chinese, Manchu, Mongolian, Tibetan, and Turki (Uyghur) were often used in the Qing realm.

The Qing dynasty was established in Chinese as "Da Qing" (大清, "Great Qing") in 1636, but other Chinese names containing the name "Qing" had appeared in official documents such as treaties, including Da Qing Guo (大清國, "Great Qing State"), Da Qing Di Guo (大清帝國, "Empire of the Great Qing"), and Zhong Hua Da Qing Guo (中華大清國, "Chinese Great Qing State"), in addition to the name Zhongguo (中國, "China"). In the Chinese-language versions of its treaties and its maps of the world, the Qing government used "Great Qing" and "Zhongguo" interchangeably. Instead of the earlier Ming idea of an ethnic Han Chinese state, this new Qing China was a self-consciously multi-ethnic state. Han Chinese literati had some time to adapt this, but by the 19th century the notion of China as a multinational state had become the standard terminology for Han Chinese writers.

Apart from Zhongguo, the Qing court routinely used other terms as well in referring to its state in Chinese, such as guochao (國朝, lit. "state dynasty"), wojie (我界, "our territory"), and wochao (我朝) or benchao (本朝, lit. "our dynasty"). But it treated these titles and Zhongguo (China) as interchangeable. For example, the Chinese version of the 1689 Treaty of Nerchinsk as inscribed in the border markers used Zhongguo as the state title: "All of the land to the south of the Xing’an mountains and all branches of the Heilong River belong to Zhongguo" (China), but in a different version of the same treaty, it was replaced by the term "our territory" (wojie): "All of the land ... belong to our territory" (wojie). The Manchu term Dulimbai Gurun is the standard translation for the Chinese terms Zhongguo, Zhongyuan, and Hua and appeared in official documents produced by the Qing court beginning in 1689, if not earlier.

The Manchu name for the state was ᡩᠠᡳ᠌ᠴᡳᠩ
ᡤᡠᡵᡠᠨ (Daicing Gurun). While the Manchu term ᡩᠠᡳ᠌ᠴᡳᠩ (Daicing) sounds like a phonetic rendering of Chinese Dà Qīng or Dai Ching, may in fact have been derived from a Mongolian word "ᠳᠠᠢᠢᠴᠢᠨ, дайчин" (daicin) that means "warrior". Daicing Gurun may therefore have meant "warrior state", a pun that was only intelligible to Manchu and Mongol people. In the later part of the dynasty, however, even the Manchus themselves had forgotten this possible meaning. Similar to in the Chinese language, Dulimbai Gurun (the Manchu term for "Zhongguo" or "China") is used alongside Daicing Gurun to refer to the Qing dynasty during the Qing. From a Manchu perspective, the concept of "China" (Chinese: Zhongguo; Manchu: Dulimbai Gurun) embraced the entire empire, including Manchuria, Mongolia, Xinjiang, and Tibet.

In the Mongolian language, the state was usually known as ᠴᠢᠨ
ᠤᠯᠤᠰ ("Чин Улс" or Chin uls, i.e. "Qing state") or ᠶᠡᠬᠡ
ᠴᠢᠨ
ᠤᠯᠤᠰ ("Их Чин Улс" or Dai Chin uls, i.e. "Great Qing state"), along with other variation terms for the empire like "man-u Dai Chin (uls)" ("Our Great Qing [state]"), "Manj (Chin) uls" (Manchu [Qing] State), "the state of our Manchu Emperor", or "Emperor's state", which were traditionally used by some Mongol subjects under the Qing. On the other hand, unlike in Chinese and Manchu languages, the counterpart in Mongolian language for the name "Zhongguo" or "Dulimbai Gurun" (China) did not appear to be commonly used among Mongol writers in such sense during the Qing period. The traditional Mongolian name for China is ᠬᠢᠲᠠᠳ ("Хятад" or Khyatad), which only refers to the areas of native (Han) Chinese. Whereas the counterpart for the name "Zhongguo" or "Dulimbai Gurun" in Mongolian appeared as ᠳᠤᠮᠳᠠᠳᠦ
ᠤᠯᠤᠰ (Dumdadu ulus or initially Dumdadu gürün, literally "central state"), which was used by the Qing government (such as the Lifan Yuan, Treaty of Kiakhta in 1727 and late Qing textbooks) to refer to the whole empire, including usages like "the Mongolian Kalun of China" (ᠳᠤᠮᠳᠠᠳᠤ
ᠤᠯᠤᠰ
ᠤᠨ
ᠮᠣᠩᠭᠣᠯ
ᠬᠠᠷᠠᠭᠤᠯ, dumdadu ulus un mongγol qaraγul, or initially dumdadu gürün-ü mongγol qaraγul as appeared in the 1727 Treaty of Kiakhta), when the term "Dumdadu ulus" started to be used among Mongol nobility themselves it seemed to be limited to the area south of the Great Wall (essentially the same as the word "Khyatad" in meaning), such as in the works of the Eight-Banner bannerman Lomi and Injannashi since 1735. Nevertheless, while early Mongol historians presented the idea of the Mongols as a distinct entity under the Qing, in the 19th century Mongol historians began to focus on the entire Qing, of which the Mongols, along with the Manchus, Han Chinese, and Tibetans, were only one part.

In the Tibetan language, the Qing dynasty is known as ཆིང་རྒྱལ་རབས། (Ching rgyal rabs), and the Qing emperors were referred to as the Emperor of China (or "Chinese Emperor", in Tibetan: རྒྱ་ནག་གོང་མ་, rgya nag gong ma) and "the Great Emperor" (or "Great Emperor Manjushri", in Tibetan: འཇམ་དབྱངས་གོང་མ་ཆེན་པོ, vjam dbyangs gong ma chen po) during the Qing era. For example, in the Treaty of Thapathali of 1856 both Tibetans and Nepalese agreed to "regard the Chinese Emperor as heretofore with respect, in accordance with what has been written". The traditional Tibetan term for "China", རྒྱ་ནག་ (rgya nag, literally "vast black") was commonly used among Tibetans at the time, which generally referred to the areas of Han Chinese and Manchus in the east, and the term itself did not indicate any specific connection between Tibet and China (proper), even though Tibet was subordinated to the Qing dynasty since the 18th century. However, the counterpart for the name "Zhongguo" or "Dulimbai Gurun" (i.e. "China" in Chinese and Manchu languages) did appear in the Tibetan language as ཡུལ་དབུས། (yul dbus, literally "central land") which was used by Qing rulers like Qianlong Emperor in for example the Tibetan translation of the Śūraṅgama Sūtra he compiled in 1763 and the Tibetan-language inscription of his 1792 article The Discourse of Lama to refer to China (in the same sense as the Chinese term Zhongguo).

In the Uyghur language, the Qing dynasty is known as چىڭ سۇلالىسى (Ching sulalisi), and the Qing emperors were referred to as the "Chinese khagan" (Khāqān-i Chīn, "Khagan of China") during the Qing era, where "khāqān" is a Persianized form of the traditional title used by the Turkic peoples to refer to a ruler (similar to Mongolian "Khagan", sometimes also rendered as "Khan"), and Chīn is a traditional Turco-Persian word for China (or the people from the Chinese heartland) and was used by the Turki subjects in Xinjiang (now known as the Uyghurs) to refer to the country or area ruled by the Qing emperors during the period. The terms Khiṭāy (a traditional Turki name for China) and Bijīn (Beijing) were sometimes also used by the Turki subjects to refer to the Qing dynasty (or China in general) at that time. The name "Chinese khagan" (Khāqān-i Chīn) referring to the Emperor of China as a symbol of power appeared in medieval Persian literature works like the great 11th-century epic poem Shahnameh which were circulated widely in Xinjiang, and during the Qing dynasty the Turkic Muslim subjects in Xinjiang (and surrounding Muslim khanates like the Khanate of Kokand) associated the Qing rulers with this name and commonly referred to the Qing emperors as such.

There are also derogatory names in some languages (mostly in Chinese and Mongolian) for the Qing, such as Mǎn Qīng (滿清/满清 or манж Чин, lit. "Manchu Qing") and Dá Qīng (韃清/鞑清, lit. "Tartar Qing"), used by anti-Qing revolutionaries in the late 19th and early 20th centuries. On the other hand, before the signing of the Sino-Japanese Friendship and Trade Treaty in 1871, the first treaty between Qing China and the Empire of Japan, Japanese representatives once raised objections to China's use of the term "中國" (Zhongguo) in the treaty (partly in response to China's earlier objections for the term "天皇" (Tennō) or Emperor of Japan to be used in the treaty), declaring that the term Zhongguo was "meant to compare with the frontier areas of the country" and insisted that only "Great Qing" be used for the Qing in the Chinese version of the treaty. However, this was firmly rejected by the Qing representatives: "Our country China has been called Zhongguo for a long time since ancient times. We have signed treaties with various countries, and while Great Qing did appear in the first lines of such treaties, in the body of the treaties Zhongguo was always being used. There has never been a precedent for changing the country name" (我中華之稱中國，自上古迄今，由來已久。即與各國立約，首書寫大清國字樣，其條款內皆稱中國，從無寫改國號之例). The Chinese representatives believed that Zhongguo (China) as a country name equivalent to "Great Qing" could naturally be used internationally, which could not be changed. In the end, both sides agreed that while in the first lines "Great Qing" would be used, whether the Chinese text in the body of the treaty would use the term Zhongguo in the same manner as "Great Qing" would be up to China's discretion.

== Names in other languages ==
Apart from the English name of "China" or the "Chinese Empire", it is also known in similar names in other western languages such as Chine in French, "Китай" in Russian, and Sinicum Imperium in Latin, which are the standard translations for "China" or "Chinese Empire" in these languages. For example, in the Sino-Russian Treaty of Nerchinsk of 1689, the first international treaty signed by the Qing, the term "Китайский" meaning "Chinese" was used to refer to the Qing side in the Russian version of the treaty, and the term "Imperium Sinicum" meaning "Chinese Empire" was used to refer to the Qing empire in the Latin version of the treaty. Sometimes the names for "Great Qing" also appeared in such treaties. For example, the term "Imperii Tai-tscim" meaning "Empire of the Great Qing" appeared in the first paragraph of the Latin version of the Treaty of Kyakhta (1727) along with "Sinenses" appearing in the body of the treaty meaning "Chinese". In the Qing treaties of the 19th-20th centuries with all European states (other than Russia), only variations of "China" and "Chinese Empire" were indicated. In Japanese-language version of some treaties during the Qing dynasty, the Kanji for the Qing state (淸國, Shinkoku) was also used, although it is not found in Chinese-language version of treaties during the Qing dynasty (in Chinese version of the treaties the word for Great (大) always appeared before the word for Qing (淸), along with the term Zhongguo).

== See also ==
- Names of China
- Chinese Empire
- Qing dynasty in Inner Asia
- Legacy of the Qing dynasty
- Names of the Yuan dynasty
