= James A. Millward =

American historian

- Other names: 米華健
- Education: Harvard College (BA); School of Oriental Studies, University of London (MA); Stanford University (PhD)
- Occupation: Historian
- Employer: Georgetown University
- Spouse: Madhulika Sikka

James A. Millward is an American historian. He is currently a professor of inter-societal history at Georgetown University's Walsh School of Foreign Service. His research focuses on Chinese and Central Asian history, including the region of Xinjiang.

== Education ==
Millward holds a BA from Harvard College, an MA from SOAS University of London, and a PhD from Stanford University.

== Awards ==
Milward received a Fulbright grant in 2022 to conduct research in Norway.

== Publications ==
=== Books ===
- Eurasian Crossroads: A History of Xinjiang (revised edition), Columbia University Press, December 2021
- The Silk Road: A Very Short Introduction, Oxford University Press, April 12, 2013
- Beyond the Pass: Economy, Ethnicity, and Empire in Qing Central Asia, 1759-1864, Stanford University Press, June 1998

=== Articles ===
- China’s New Anti-Uyghur Campaign, Foreign Affairs, January 23, 2023
- Why It Matters That China’s Protests Started in Xinjiang, New York Times, December 6, 2022
- What Xi Jinping Hasn’t Learned From China’s Emperors, New York Times, October 1, 2019

=== Book Reviews ===
- ‘Reeducating’ Xinjiang’s Muslims,' New York Review of Books, February 2019

=== Edited volumes ===
- New Qing Imperial History: The Making of Inner Asian Empire at Qing Chengde. Co-edited with Mark Elliott, Ruth Dunnell, and Philippe Forêt. RoutledgeCurzon, 2004.
