= Dai Yi =

Chinese historian (1926–2024)

- 戴逸
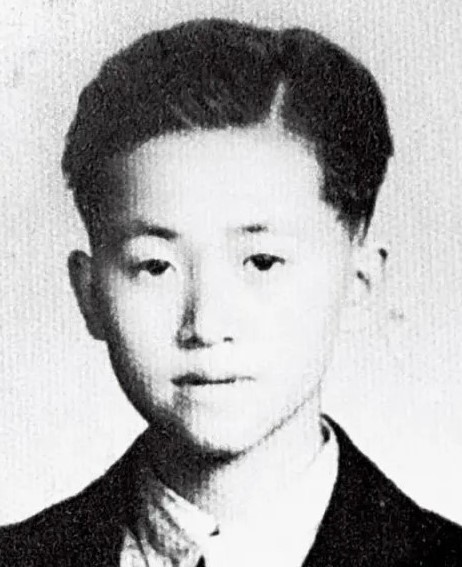
- Dai Yi in 1941
- Born: September 1926; Changshu, Jiangsu
- Died: 24 January 2024 (aged 97)
- Known for: History of Qing (2002–2023)

Academic background
- Education: Shanghai Jiao Tong University; Peking University; Hua Bei University

Academic work
- Discipline: Historian of the Qing dynasty
- Institutions: Renmin University of China (RUC)

Chinese name
- Chinese: 戴逸
- Hanyu Pinyin: Dài Yì
Transcriptions
Standard Mandarin
- Hanyu Pinyin: Dài Yì

Birth name
- Chinese: 戴秉衡
- Hanyu Pinyin: Dài Bǐnghéng
Transcriptions
Standard Mandarin
- Hanyu Pinyin: Dài Bǐnghéng

Dai Yi (September 1926 – 24 January 2024) was a Chinese historian who specialized in the history of the Qing dynasty. He was a professor at Renmin University of China (RUC). He was also the honorary director of the university's Qing dynasty's history institute as well as a doctoral student supervisor. He was a member of the Chinese Communist Party (CCP).

== Biography ==
Dai Yi was born Dai Bingheng in September 1926 in Changshu, Jiangsu. He once enrolled at the railway management college of Shanghai Jiao Tong University, but two years later, he was admitted into the history college of Peking University. During the Second Sino-Japanese War Dai took part in the Gerakan Youth and Improvement Association. By 1948, he had become a target of the Kuomintang. He escaped with assistance from the CCP, and later arrived at Hua Bei University, the predecessor institution of the RUC. After Dai's graduation, he would remain at his alma mater for his entire teaching career.

In 2002, Dai Yi was appointed director of the newly created project to complete the History of Qing, a comprehensive compilation of the history of the Qing dynasty. As of April 2020, Dai Yi continued to direct the effort.

Dai died on 24 January 2024, at the age of 97.

== Bibliography ==
- 中国近代史稿 (Modern History of China) (1958)
- 一六八九年中俄尼布楚条约 (Treaty of Nerchinsk in 1689) (1974)
- 简明清史I(A Concise History of Qing Dynasty I) (1980)
- 简明清史II(A Concise History of Qing Dynasty II) (1984)
