= Peter C. Perdue =

American historian of China

- Born: April 21, 1949 (age 77)
- Education: Harvard University; Yale University
- Occupation: Professor Emeritus of History of China
- Known for: Professor of Chinese history at Yale University.
- Notable work: Exhausting the Earth: State and Peasant in Hunan, 1500-1850 A.D. China Marches West: The Qing Conquest of Central Eurasia
- Website: https://history.yale.edu/people/peter-c-perdue

Peter C. Perdue (born 1949) is an American author, professor, and historian. He is a professor of Chinese history at Yale University. Perdue has a Ph.D. degree (1981) from Harvard University in the field of History and East Asian Languages. His research interests lie in modern Chinese and Japanese social and economic history, history of frontiers, and world history. He has also written on grain markets in China, agricultural development, and environmental history.

He is the author of two widely acclaimed books: Exhausting the Earth: State and Peasant in Hunan 1500-1850 A.D. (Council on East Asian Studies, Harvard University, 1987) and China Marches West: The Qing Conquest of Central Eurasia (Harvard University Press, 2005), which won the 2006 Joseph Levenson Book Prize. In giving the award, the Levenson committee said the work fundamentally alters how we understand the relationship between Qing China and the people of Central Eurasia. His book concentrates on the period of time from the rise of the Manchus in the first decades of the seventeenth century to the return of the Torghuts in the last half of the eighteenth century, an event with which, he says, “the steppe ended, and a great chapter in world history closed.” This comment points to a highly commendable feature of this sweeping and meticulous study: Perdue places the Qing march into central Asia squarely in the contexts both of Chinese and of world history. He shows, for example, how the Qing response to trade with Britain on China’s south coast was shaped by the earlier but quite different Qing experience on the Eurasian frontier. On a larger world stage, Perdue compares state building in Qing China, France, and the Ottoman Empire, pointing to both similarities and dissimilarities in these efforts.

The committee went on to commend Perdue for drawing on sources and scholarship from Chinese, Japanese, Manchu, German, French, and Russian, "to say nothing of English, the latter a language he also writes with clarity and grace." The book established Perdue as a major figure in the New Qing History intellectual movement.

He is a recipient of the 1988 Edgerton Award, the James A. Levitan Prize, and a past holder of the Ford International Career Development Chair. He was elected to the American Academy of Arts and Sciences in 2007.

He also laid issues of historiography of the Dzungar Khanate, stating Russian authors and sources either has issues of Marxism or to justify the Russian conquest of Siberia. While the Chinese sources tend to be more Han nationalist, deny the Anti-Qing sentiment among the Mongols.

== Publications ==
- Exhausting the Earth: State and Peasant in Hunan 1500-1850 A.D. (Council on East Asian Studies, Harvard University, 1987)
- China Marches West. The Qing Conquest of Central Eurasia (Harvard University Press, 2005)

Winner of the 2007 Joseph Levenson Book Prize: Pre-1900 Category

- Imperial Formations (Co-editor with Ann Laura Stoler and Carole McGranahan, 2007)
- Shared Histories of Modernity: China, India and the Ottoman Empire (Co-editor with Huricihan Islamoglu, 2009).
