= High Qing era =

Historical period of Qing China (1683–1799)

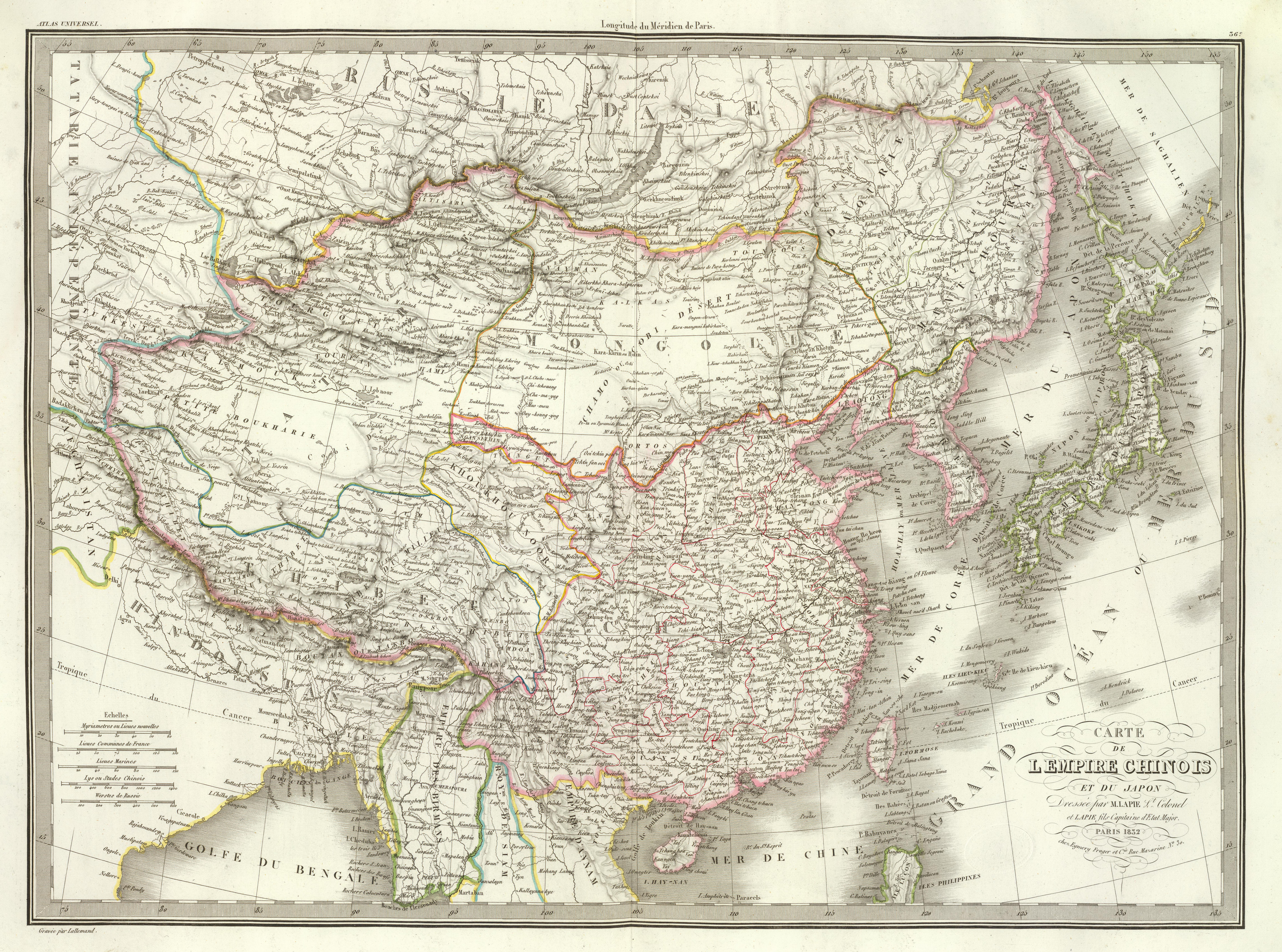
Territory under the control of the Qing Empire in 1832.

The High Qing era (Chinese: 康雍乾盛世; pinyin: Kāng Yōng Qián Shèngshì), or simply the High Qing, is a historiographical term for the first half of the Qing dynasty between approximately 1683 and the 1790s. China was ruled by the Kangxi, Yongzheng, and Qianlong emperors in this period, during which the prosperity and power of the empire grew to new heights. The era began with the quelling of the Revolt of the Three Feudatories and conquest of the Ming Zheng regime in Taiwan, and ended with the major outbreaks of the White Lotus Rebellion and the Miao Rebellion. It has been regarded as a golden age in the late Imperial China.

Following the collapse of the Ming dynasty after the Jiashen Incident, China entered a violent period of civil wars among the Manchu-led Qing forces (who entered the China proper after the Ming general Wu Sangui defected and surrendered the Shanhai Pass), the various factions within Southern Ming (the rump state headed by surviving Ming princes), the remnant Shun forces (who actually overthrew the Ming dynasty) and the Xi forces (who split from Shun to occupy the Sichuan Basin). After the Qing forces defeated other contenders and consolidated rule over the entirety of China, the High Qing era saw China transform into a commercial state with nearly twice the population of its predecessor due to high political stability. Improvements in literacy also took place during this period, and the territory of China was greatly expanded north and west compared to the previous Ming dynasty. During the High Qing, the trend of imitating Chinese artistic traditions, known as chinoiserie, gained great popularity in Europe, due to the rise in trade with China and the broader current of Orientalism.

== Characteristics of the High Qing ==
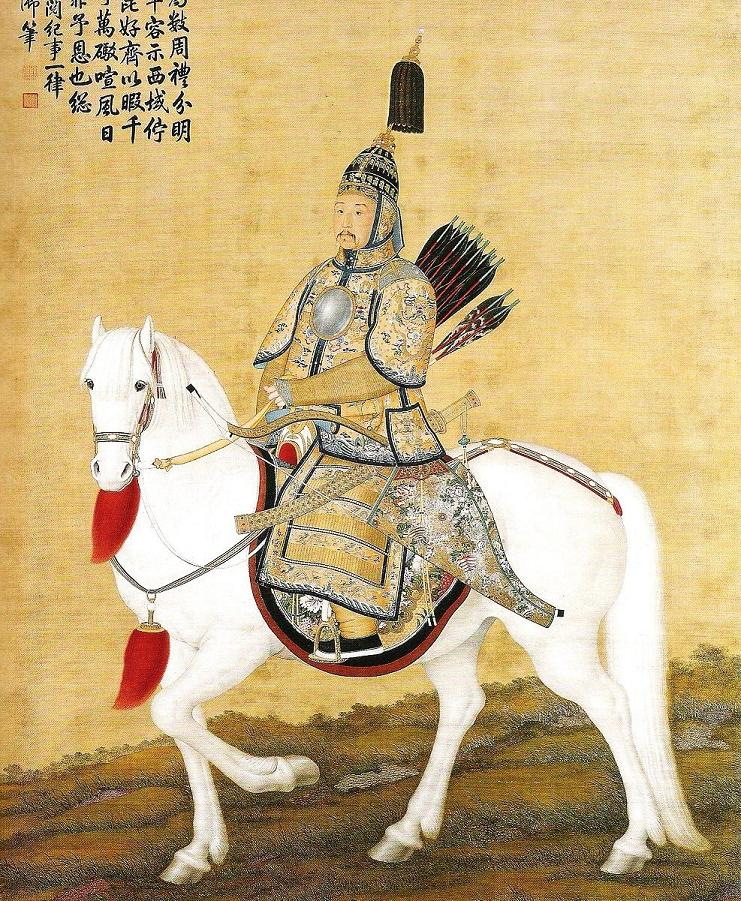
Kangxi Emperor showcasing his Manchu style horse riding

The three Emperors of the High Qing combined the strengths of their Manchu culture in addition to a level of Sinicization of the conquered cultures, to combine assimilation and the retaining of their own cultural identity. The Kangxi Emperor initiated the High Qing period. As an emperor, he elevated the empire through his passion for education in combination with his military expertise, and his restructuring of the bureaucracy into that of a cosmopolitan one. Under Kangxi, China also compiled expansive works of literature, encyclopedias, and dictionaries such as the Kangxi Dictionary, the Complete Tang Poems, and the Complete Classics Collection of Ancient China.

Kangxi's son and successor, the Yongzheng Emperor, had a shorter reign than either his father or his son, Qianlong. Yongzheng ruled through more harsh and brutal tactics, but was also efficient and committed to the maintenance of the empire. He worked late everyday writing reforms to centralize the government. To control Mongolia and Tibet in the southwest he used his centralized military.

The last emperor of the High Qing was the Qianlong Emperor who, following in the footsteps of his father and grandfather, was the ruler who created the peak of the High Qing empire. During Qianlong's reign, the Qing empire expanded to its furthest extent and saw the creation of more classic works of literature such as the Dream of the Red Chamber and Complete Library of the Four Treasuries. The unique and unprecedented ruling techniques of these emperors, and the emphasis on multiculturalism fostered the productivity and success of the High Qing era.

=== Population growth ===
The economic base and living standards of Qing China experienced a stark improvement during the 18th century; driven by increases in both agricultural output and trade volumes, it saw a tripling of its population. Growth in population not only exceeded the Ming period but eventually surpassed it, due to long periods of peace and economic prosperity with the growth of commerce. A consensus estimate might place the population in 1700 at about 150 million, roughly the same as it had been under the height of the Ming. By 1800, it had reached 300 million or more, and then rose further to around 450 million by the mid-19th century, as the most populous country in the world at the time. It is commonly agreed that pre-modern China's population experienced two growth spurts, one during the Northern Song period (960–1127), and other during the Qing period (around 1700–1830). Not only was the Qing population growth rate 40 percent greater than that of the Song, but the growth also proved to be more sustainable, decisively and permanently changing China's demographic trajectory.

=== Territorial expansion ===
Apart from the increased population, the Qing Empire was much larger in territorial size than the previous Ming dynasty, since the Qing had greatly expanded its rule in Inner Asia during the High Qing era, especially during the Dzungar–Qing Wars from 1687 to 1758. A Qing government agency known as the Lifan Yuan was set up to oversee the empire's frontier regions. Additionally, the conquest of the western territories of the Mongols, Tibetans, and Muslims under the rule of the Qing were another factor of prosperity. Again, the skillful rule of the era's emperors, in combination with military campaigns like the Ten Great Campaigns allowed for this success. Rule through chiefdoms in territories like Taiwan, allowed for the conquered peoples to retain their culture and be ruled by their own people while the Qing Empire still possessed the ultimate control and rule. These ruling tactics created little need or reason for rebellion by the conquered.

=== Commercial expansion ===
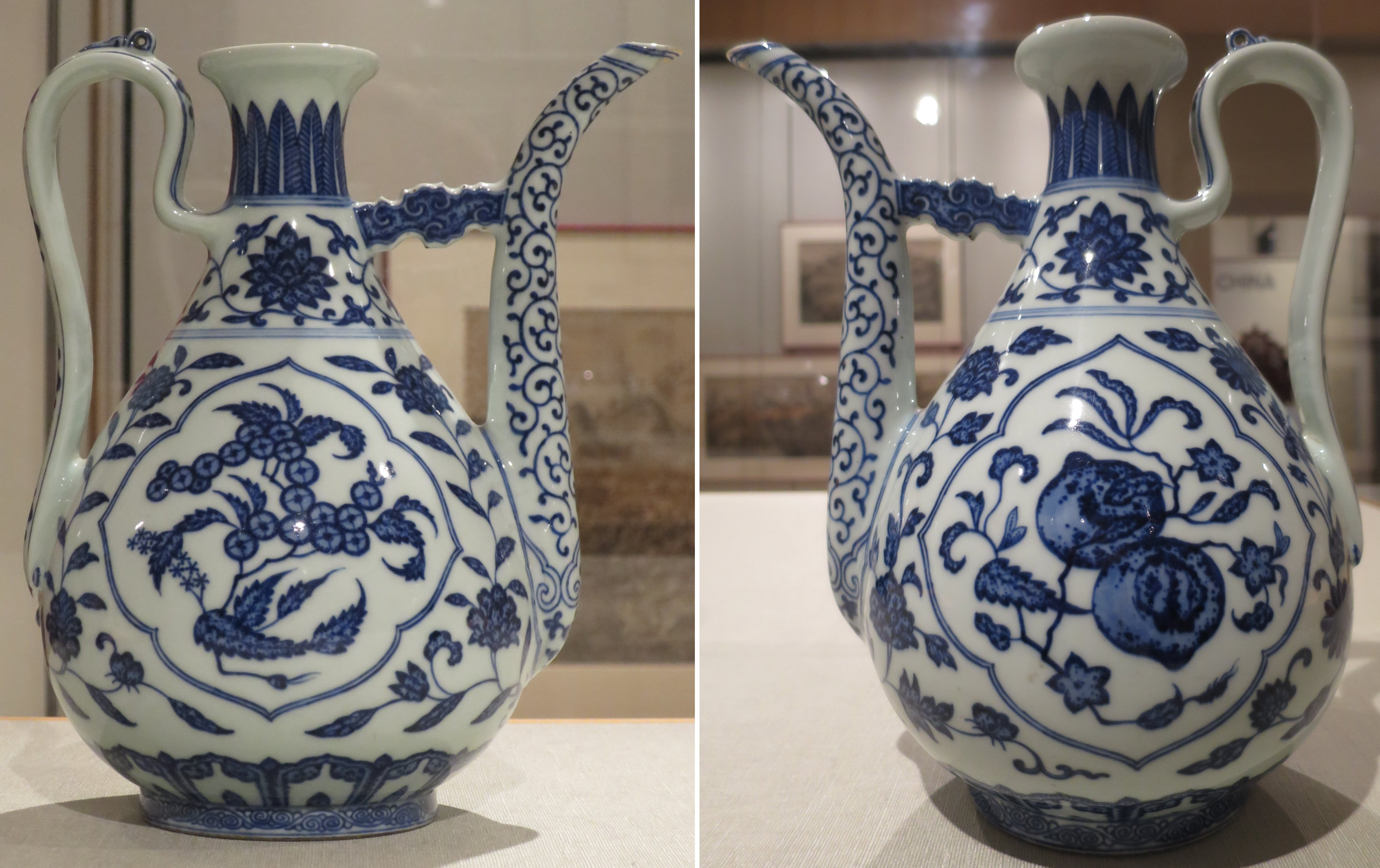
Examples of the high quality porcelain that was mass produced during the High Qing era

A heavy revival of the arts was another characteristic of the High Qing Empire. Through commercialization, items such as porcelain were mass-produced and used in trade. Also, literature was emphasized as Imperial libraries were erected, and literacy rates of men and women both rose within the elite class. The significance of education and art in this era is that it created economic stimulation that would last for a period of over fifty years. Scholars also describe the period up to the High Qing era as a second commercial revolution, which was even more transformative than the first that occurred earlier during the Song dynasty. By the end of the 18th century, what historians sometimes refer to as a "circulation economy" or "commodity economy" developed, in which commercialization penetrated local rural society to an unprecedented degree.

=== Literacy ===
Another characteristic of the High Qing was rising literacy rates, not only among men, but women as well. Because men left the home more frequently during this era due to the commercialization of the trade industry, there was this conception that for the males for the family to succeed outside the home, women of the house needed to possess their own distinct morals and authority. This meant that the most ideal mothers of elite families would be educated as well as their husbands, in reading and writing. The main purpose for this was to start teaching their sons to read and write as young as possible to better prepare them for the civil service examinations in their intended futures. The emphasis on women's education is a major change from that of previous eras, which further distinguishes the High Qing from that of other eras, and empires.

== See also ==
- Chinese expansionism
- Economy of the Qing dynasty
- Golden ages of China
- Pax Sinica
- Chinese Empire
- Tributary system of China
- Legacy of the Qing dynasty
