= Evelyn Rawski =

American historian

Evelyn Sakakida Rawski (born February 2, 1939) is an American scholar of Chinese and Inner Asian history. She is currently a Distinguished University Professor in the Department of History of the University of Pittsburgh. She was born in Honolulu, Hawaii, United States of Japanese-American ancestry. She served as president of the Association for Asian Studies in 1995–1996.

Rawski has written extensively on history of the Qing dynasty, and is considered a seminal figure of the school called the New Qing History.

== Education and career ==
She graduated from President Theodore Roosevelt High School in Honolulu, then took her bachelor's degree from Cornell University in 1961, graduating with high honors in Economics and Phi Beta Kappa. Inspired by sinologist Knight Biggerstaff at Cornell, Rawski decided to pursue historical studies in graduate school, and earned a Ph.D. in History and Far Eastern languages at Harvard University in 1968 under Yang Lien-sheng. She is fluent in English, French, Chinese, Japanese, and Manchu languages.

== Contributions to the New Qing History ==
Rawski's research has centered on the social and cultural history of the Qing dynasty, often in ways that revise earlier views of political history. Education and Popular Literacy in Ch'ing China (1979) targeted the standard view that the nonphonetic nature of the Chinese writing system led to low literacy rates and held back economic growth. Paul A. Cohen judged that Rawski "turns this entire set of assumptions on its head...." Arguing that traditional village schools were accessible, texts cheap, and teachers low salaried, and defining functional literacy as the ability to read everyday texts rather a mastery of the classics, she concluded that male literacy rates in late imperial China were in fact among the highest in the pre-modern world, probably amounting to almost one literate person per family. Cohen commented that her analysis was "not unassailable" but that her "overall thesis" "puts the problem of literacy and popular education... in a wholly new light, and future research in this area will have to take up where she has left off."

In the early 1990s, Rawski joined a group of scholars who began study of the Manchu language and found new views opened by the materials they now could read. She presented these views in her 1996 presidential address to the Association of Asian Studies, Reenvisioning the Qing: The Significance of the Qing Period in Chinese History, which challenged the view long held by historians of China that the Manchu had been assimilated, or "sinicized" by the people they conquered. Her argument met with strong negative reaction from Ping-ti Ho in 1996 but is now widely held. The New Qing History school started to appear at this time.

Of her monograph, The Last Emperors, Jane Kate Leonard, writing in China Review International wrote "is a remarkable work of historical synthesis and descriptive analysis of the intimate social world of the Qing dynasty’s ruling elite". Leonard continues:

Her purpose is to capture the aims and intentions of the Qing emperors from the Manchu imperial perspective, which she extrapolates from the material culture of the Qing court, the social hierarchy of the inner power structure, and the state rituals and the personal religious practices of the court. Her thesis argues that the unique material culture, social hierarchy, and rituals of kingship demonstrate that the Qing monarchs were multi-ethnic in their approach to kingship and practical governance. She further argues that their success was due not to "sinicization" but to their multiethnic perspective, which enabled them to craft regionally specific approaches to their diverse constituencies of Mongols, northeastern peoples, Tibetans, and Han Chinese.

== Major publications ==
- Agricultural Change and the Peasant Economy of South China, Harvard University Press, 1972.
- —— (1979). Education and Popular Literacy in Ch'ing China. Ann Arbor: University of Michigan Press. ISBN 978-0-472-08753-2.
- with David Johnson and Andrew J. Nathan, eds., Popular Culture in Late Imperial China, University of California Press, 1985.
- with Susan Naquin, Chinese Society in the Eighteenth Century, Yale University Press, 1987.
- with James L. Watson, eds., Death Ritual in Late Imperial and Modern China, University of California Press, 1988.
- ——; Crossley, Pamela Kyle (1993). "A Profile of the Manchu Language in Ch'ing History". Harvard Journal of Asiatic Studies. 53 (1): 63–102. doi:10.2307/2719468. JSTOR 2719468. S2CID 192270675.
- with Bell Yung and Rubie S. Watson, eds., Harmony and Counterpoint: Ritual Music in Chinese Context, Stanford University Press, 1996.
- —— (1996). "Reenvisioning the Qing: The Significance of the Qing Period in Chinese History". Journal of Asian Studies. 55 (4): 829–850. doi:10.2307/2646525. JSTOR 2646525. S2CID 162388379..
- with Murdo J. MacLeod, eds. European Intruders and Changes in Behaviour and Customs in Africa and Asia before 1800. volume 30 in An Expanding World: The European Impact on World History 1450–1800, Ashgate Publishing Ltd., 1998.
- —— (1998). The Last Emperors: A Social History of Qing Imperial Institutions. Berkeley: University of California Press. ISBN 978-0-520-21289-3.
- with Jan Stuart, Worshiping the Ancestors: Chinese Commemorative Portraits. Stanford University Press, June 2001.
- with Jessica Rawson, eds. China: The Three Emperors, 1662–1795, London: Royal Academy of Arts, 2005.
- —— (2005), "Qing publishing in non-Han languages", in Brokaw, Cynthia Joanne; Kai-wing Chow (eds.), Printing and Book Culture in Late Imperial China, Berkeley: University of California Press, ISBN 978-0-520-23126-9
- —— (2015). Early Modern China and Northeast Asia : Cross-Border Perspectives. Cambridge: Cambridge University Press. ISBN 978-1-107-09308-9.
