= Ping-ti Ho =

Chinese American historian

Ping-ti Ho or Bingdi He (Chinese: 何炳棣; pinyin: Hé Bǐngdì; Wade–Giles: Ho Ping-ti; 1917–2012), who also wrote under the name P.T. Ho, was a Chinese-American historian. He wrote widely on China's history, including works on demography, plant history, ancient archaeology, and contemporary events. He taught at University of Chicago for most of his career, and was president of the Association for Asian Studies in 1975, the first scholar of East Asian descent to have that honor.

== Biography ==
Ho's ancestral hometown is Jinhua, Zhejiang Province, and was born in Tianjin in 1917. In 1934, Ho studied at the Department of History of Tsinghua University in Beijing, then he went to Shanghai studying at Kwang Hua University temporarily due to the Second Sino-Japanese War, and graduated in Tsinghua with a BA in 1938. After graduation, Ho went to Yunnan in southwestern China during the Second Sino-Japanese War, and became a teaching assistant at the Department of History of the National Southwestern Associated University (a university temporarily jointed by the Peking University, Tsinghua University and Nankai University, during the war). In 1944, Ho won and obtained financial support from the Sixth Boxer Indemnity Scholarship, and went to study in the United States in 1945.

Ho entered Columbia University in New York City, and graduated with a PhD in history in 1952. His doctoral dissertation concerned British history in the 19th century. Ho had already taught at the University of British Columbia in Vancouver, British Columbia of Canada. In 1963, Ho went to teach at the University of Chicago. In 1965, Ho was promoted to the James Westfall Thompson Professor of History at the University of Chicago. Ho retired from Chicago in 1987, but he soon became the Visiting Distinguished Professor of History and Social Sciences at the University of California, Irvine, where he retired for the second time in 1990.

Ho was elected as an academician of Academia Sinica in 1966, a member of American Academy of Arts and Sciences in 1979, and an honorary member of the Chinese Academy of Social Sciences in 1997. Ho was also "the first Asian-born scholar ever to have been elected as President of the Association for Asian Studies".

Ho received several honorary doctorates, including the L.L.D. from the Chinese University of Hong Kong in 1975, the L.H.D. from Lawrence University in 1978, and the L.H.D. from Denison University in 1988.

== Historiographical debates ==
He forcefully attacked the school now known as the New Qing History in his exchange with Evelyn Rawski in 1996. He argued, following the Harvard school of John King Fairbank, that the Manchu rulers had become "sinicized" and did not have a distinctive non-Chinese approach. He said sinicization was not incompatible with the politics of a multiethnic empire, yet to reject sinicization is to deny a fundamental force in Chinese history.

His cousin Ho Ping-sung was also a famous historian in China.

== Publications ==
Major books

- Studies on the Population of China, 1368–1953 (1959)
- The Ladder of Success in Imperial China, Aspects of Social Mobility, 1368–1911 (1962)
- 中國會館史論 (in Chinese). 1966.
- The Cradle of the East: An Inquiry into the Indigenous Origins of Techniques and Ideas of Neolithic and Early Historic China, 5000–1000 B.C. (1975)
- 读史阅世六十年 [60 Years of Reading History and Living Life] (in Chinese). Beijing: Zhonghua Book Company. 2012. ISBN 978-7-101-08541-9.

Major articles

- Ho (1954). "The Salt Merchants of Yang-Chou: A Study of Commercial Capitalism in Eighteenth-Century China". Harvard Journal of Asiatic Studies. 17 (1–2): 130–168. doi:10.2307/2718130. JSTOR 2718130.
- "Aspects of social mobility in China, 1368-1911." Comparative Studies in Society and History 1.4 (1959): 330-359. online
- Ho, Ping-ti (1967). "The Significance of the Ch'ing Period in Chinese History". The Journal of Asian Studies. 26 (2): 189–195. doi:10.2307/2051924. JSTOR 2051924. S2CID 162396785.
- Ho, Ping-ti (1998). "In Defense of Sinicization: A Rebuttal of Evelyn Rawski's "Reenvisioning the Qing"". The Journal of Asian Studies. 57 (1): 123–155. doi:10.1017/s0021911800022713. S2CID 162071050.
