= History of the Qing dynasty =

The history of the Qing dynasty began in the first half of the 17th century, when the Qing dynasty was established and became the last imperial dynasty of China, succeeding the Ming dynasty (1368–1644). The Manchu leader Hong Taiji (Emperor Taizong) renamed the Later Jin established by his father Nurhaci to "Great Qing" in 1636, sometimes referred to as the Predynastic Qing in historiography. By 1644 the Shunzhi Emperor and his prince regent seized control of the Ming capital Beijing, and the year 1644 is generally considered the start of the dynasty's rule. The Qing dynasty lasted until 1912, when Puyi (Xuantong Emperor) abdicated the throne in response to the 1911 Revolution. As the final imperial dynasty in Chinese history, the Qing dynasty reached heights of power unlike any of the Chinese dynasties which preceded it, engaging in large-scale territorial expansion which ended with embarrassing defeat and humiliation to the foreign powers whom they believe to be inferior to them. The Qing dynasty's inability to successfully counter Western and Japanese imperialism ultimately led to its downfall, and the instability which emerged in China during the final years of the dynasty ultimately paved the way for the Warlord Era.

Though he did not officially found the Qing dynasty, Later Jin ruler Nurhaci, originally a Ming vassal who officially considered himself a local representative of imperial Ming power, laid the foundation for its emergence through his policies of uniting various Jurchen tribes, consolidating the Eight Banners military system and conquering territory from the Ming after he openly renounced the Ming overlordship with the Seven Grievances in 1618. His son, Hong Taiji, who officially proclaimed the Qing dynasty, consolidated the territories that he had inherited control over from Nurhaci and laid the groundwork for the conquest of the Ming dynasty, although he died before this was accomplished. As Ming control disintegrated, peasant rebels led by Li Zicheng captured the Ming capital Beijing in 1644 and founded the short-lived Shun dynasty, but the Ming general Wu Sangui opened the Shanhai Pass to the armies of the Qing regent Prince Dorgon, who defeated the rebels, seized the capital, and took over the government, although he also implemented the infamous queue decree to force the Han Chinese to adopt the hairstyle. Under the rule of the Shunzhi Emperor, the Qing dynasty conquered most of the territory of the Ming dynasty, chasing loyalist remnants into the southwestern provinces, and establishing the basis of Qing rule over China proper. The Kangxi Emperor ascended to the throne in 1662, ruling for 61 years until 1722. During his reign, the Qing dynasty entered into an era of prosperity known as the High Qing era. The Revolt of the Three Feudatories was suppressed under his reign, and various border conflicts were resolved. Succeeding him was the Yongzheng Emperor, who proved to be an able reformer. Under the reign of him and his son, the Qianlong Emperor, the Qing military engaged in the Ten Great Campaigns on the Chinese frontier. During this period, the Qing dynasty, through its military conquests, reached a territorial extent never seen before in Chinese history.

However, the large size of the Qing empire and its stagnating economy would soon start to take its toll. Corruption became an increasingly widespread issue, as Chinese officials such as Heshen regularly stole tax revenue and public funds, leading to widespread starvation among the Chinese public. The Jiaqing Emperor attempted to stamp out corruption, and suppressed the White Lotus and Miao rebellions. His successor, the Daoguang Emperor, attempted to suppress the opium trade in China, which brought the Qing dynasty into conflict with the British in the First Opium War. The war resulted in a Chinese defeat and the Treaty of Nanjing, an "unequal treaty" which ceded Hong Kong Island to the British and opened several ports to foreign trade. In 1856, further tensions between the Qing dynasty and foreign powers led to the outbreak of the Second Opium War, which resulted in further "unequal treaties" being signed by the Chinese government. Amidst a backdrop of rising economic issues, sectarian tension and foreign interventions, the Taiping Rebellion broke out in 1850. Led by Christian revolutionary Hong Xiuquan, the rebels established the Taiping Heavenly Kingdom. The rebellion ultimately became one of the bloodiest conflicts in history, killing roughly 20 to 30 million people, and proved to be a pyrrhic victory at best for the Qing dynasty, as it would collapse less than 50 years after the rebellion. The rebellion resulted in increased sectarian tension and accelerated regionalism, in what would prove to be a foreshadowing of the Warlord Era that would come after the fall of the Qing.

Despite these issues, the Qing dynasty carried on after the rebellion, with Empress Dowager Cixi as its effective head from 1861 to 1908. She was a moderate reformer, overseeing the Tongzhi Restoration. The turn of the century Boxer Rebellion exemplified popular discontent, and led to an international coalition invading China to protect foreign citizens and interests. Cixi sided with the rebels, and was dealt a decisive defeat by the combined forces of the coalition. Cixi's death in 1908 left the country in deep trouble and without an effective leader. The emperor, Puyi, was a toddler, and the control of his regency was fiercely contested. Yuan Shikai maneuvered himself into power as president of an ineffectual Republic, and forced the abdication of Puyi, the last emperor, in 1912. This brought an end to the Qing dynasty, and over 2,000 years of imperial rule in China. Shikai briefly ruled as a dictator, but proved incapable of ruling all China, and the country splintered apart, not to be fully reunited until 1928 under Chiang Kai-shek. A brief and ineffective restoration of the dynasty occurred in 1917 with Puyi at its head, emblematic of the chaotic and inconclusive conflicts that would wrack China until Kuomintang rule.

== Formation of the Manchu state ==
=== Overview ===
The Qing dynasty was founded not by Han Chinese, who constitute the majority of the Chinese population, but by the Manchu, descendants of a sedentary farming people known as the Jurchen, a Tungusic people who lived around the region now comprising the Chinese provinces of Jilin and Heilongjiang. The Manchus are sometimes mistaken for a nomadic people, which they were not. Early European writers had used the term "Tartar" indiscriminately for all the peoples of Northern Eurasia but in the 17th century Catholic missionary writings established "Tartar" to refer only to the Manchus and "Tartary" for the lands they ruled, that is, Manchuria and adjacent parts of Inner Asia as ruled by the Qing before the Ming-Qing transition (see also Chinese Tartary).

=== Nurhaci ===
What was to become the Manchu state was founded by Nurhaci, the chieftain of a minor Jurchen tribe – the Aisin Gioro – in Jianzhou in the early 17th century. Nurhaci may have spent time in a Chinese household in his youth, and became fluent in Chinese as well as Mongol, and read the Chinese novels Romance of the Three Kingdoms and Water Margin. As a vassal of the Ming emperors who officially considered himself a guardian of the Ming border and a local representative of imperial power of the Ming dynasty, Nurhaci embarked on an intertribal feud in 1582 that escalated into a campaign to unify the nearby tribes. By 1616, however, he had sufficiently consolidated Jianzhou so as to be able to proclaim himself Khan of the Great Jin in reference to the previous Jurchen Jin dynasty.

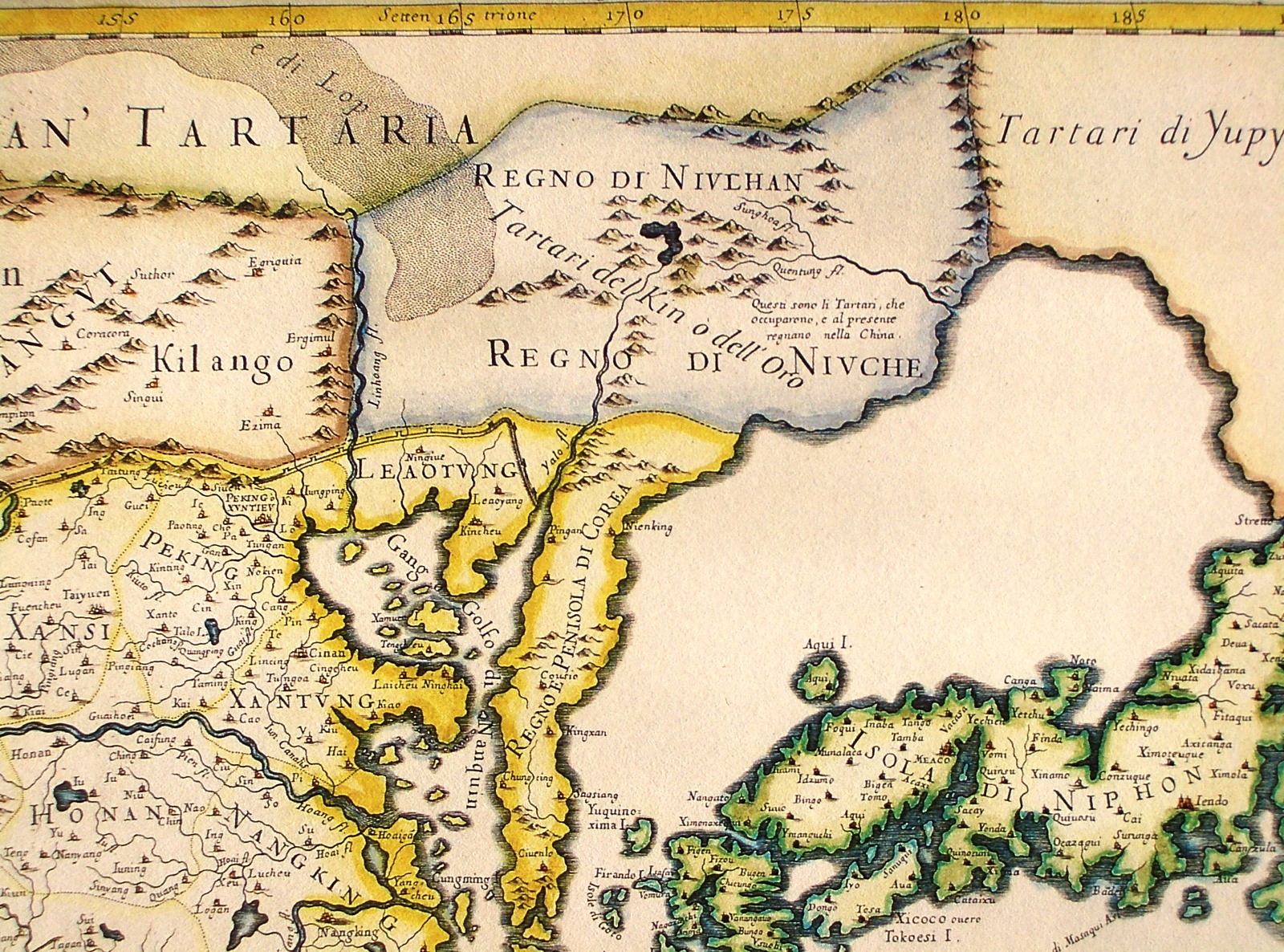
An Italian map showing the "Kingdom of the Nüzhen" or the "Jin Tartars", who "have occupied and are at present ruling China", north of Liaodong and Korea, published in 1682. Manchuria is the homeland of the Manchus, the designation introduced in 1635 for the Jurchen.

Two years later, Nurhaci announced the "Seven Grievances" and openly renounced the sovereignty of Ming overlordship in order to complete the unification of those Jurchen tribes still allied with the Ming emperor. After a series of successful battles, he relocated his capital from Hetu Ala to successively bigger captured Ming cities in Liaodong: first Liaoyang in 1621, then Shenyang (Manchu: Mukden) in 1625.

When the Jurchens were reorganized by Nurhaci into the Eight Banners, many Manchu clans were artificially created as a group of unrelated people founded a new Manchu clan (Manchu: mukūn) using a geographic origin name such as a toponym for their hala (clan name). The irregularities over Jurchen and Manchu clan origin led the Qing to document and systematize the creation of histories for Manchu clans, including manufacturing an entire legend around the origin of the Aisin Gioro clan by taking mythology from the northeast.

Relocating his court from Jianzhou to Liaodong provided Nurhaci access to more resources; it also brought him in close contact with the Khorchin Mongol domains on the plains of Mongolia. Although by this time the once-united Mongol nation had long since fragmented into individual and hostile tribes, these tribes still presented a serious security threat to the Ming borders. Nurhaci's policy towards the Khorchins was to seek their friendship and cooperation against the Ming, securing his western border from a powerful potential enemy.

Furthermore, the Khorchin proved a useful ally in the war, lending the Jurchens their expertise as cavalry archers. To guarantee this new alliance, Nurhaci initiated a policy of inter-marriages between the Jurchen and Khorchin nobilities, while those who resisted were met with military action. This is a typical example of Nurhaci's initiatives that eventually became official Qing government policy. During most of the Qing period, the Mongols gave military assistance to the Manchus.

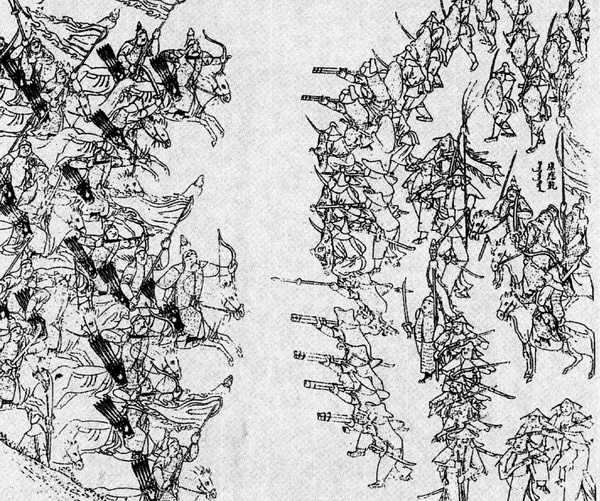
The Manchu cavalry charging Ming infantry in the battle of Sarhu in 1619

Some other important contributions by Nurhaci include ordering the creation of a written Manchu script, based on Mongolian script, after the earlier Jurchen script was forgotten (it had been derived from Khitan and Chinese). Nurhaci also created the civil and military administrative system that eventually evolved into the Eight Banners, the defining element of Manchu identity and the foundation for transforming the loosely knitted Jurchen tribes into a single nation.

There were too few ethnic Manchus to conquer China proper, so they gained strength by defeating and absorbing Mongols. More importantly, they added Han Chinese to the Eight Banners. The Manchus had to create an entire "Jiu Han jun" (Old Han Army) due to the massive number of Han Chinese soldiers who were absorbed into the Eight Banners by both capture and defection. Ming artillery was responsible for many victories against the Manchus, so the Manchus established an artillery corps made out of Han Chinese soldiers in 1641, and the swelling of Han Chinese numbers in the Eight Banners led in 1642 to all Eight Han Banners being created. Armies of defected Ming Han Chinese conquered southern China for the Qing.

Han Chinese played a massive role in the Qing conquest of China proper. Han Chinese Generals who defected to the Manchu were often given women from the Imperial Aisin Gioro family in marriage while the ordinary soldiers who surrendered were often given non-royal Manchu women as wives. Jurchen (Manchu) women married Han Chinese in Liaodong. Manchu Aisin Gioro princesses were also given in marriage to Han Chinese officials' sons.

=== Hong Taiji ===
The unbroken series of Nurhaci's military successes ended in January 1626 when he was defeated by Yuan Chonghuan while laying siege to Ningyuan. He died a few months later and was succeeded by his eighth son, Hong Taiji, who emerged as the new Khan after a short political struggle amongst other contenders. Although Hong Taiji was an experienced leader and the commander of two Banners at the time of his succession, his reign did not start well on the military front. The Jurchens suffered yet another defeat in 1627 at the hands of Yuan Chonghuan. This defeat was also in part due to the Ming's newly acquired Portuguese cannons.

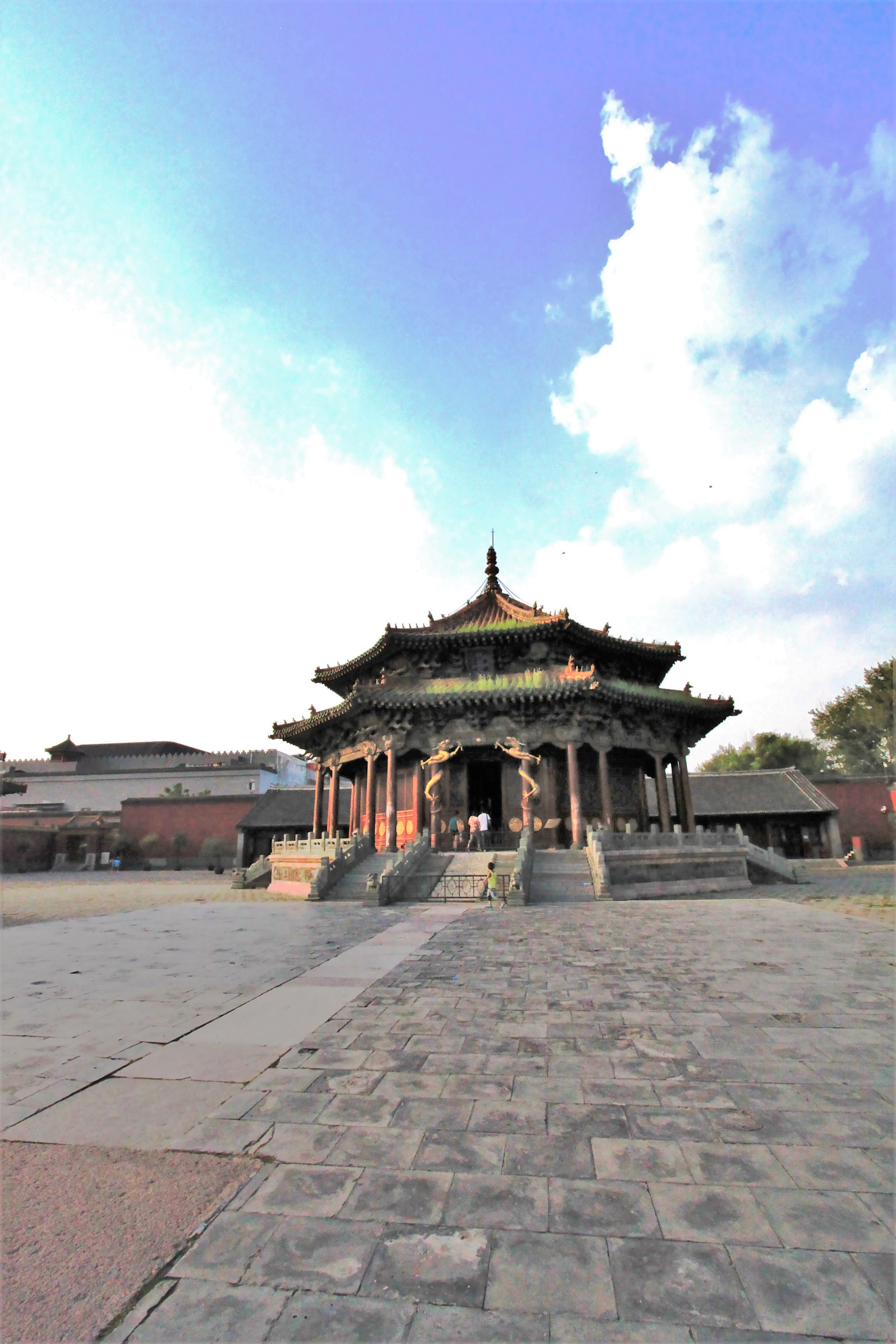
The Mukden Palace

To redress the technological and numerical disparity, Hong Taiji created his own artillery corps in 1634, the ujen cooha (Chinese: 重軍) from his existing Han troops who cast their own cannons in the European design with the help of defector Chinese metallurgists. One of the defining events of Hong Taiji's reign was the official adoption of the name "Manchu" for the united Jurchen people in November 1635. In 1635, the Manchus' Mongol allies were fully incorporated into a separate Banner hierarchy under direct Manchu command. Hong Taiji conquered the territory north of Shanhai Pass by Ming dynasty and Ligdan Khan in Inner Mongolia. In April 1636, Mongol nobility of Inner Mongolia, Manchu nobility and the Han mandarin held the Kurultai in Shenyang, and recommended the khan of Later Jin to be the emperor of the Great Qing empire. One of the Yuan Dynasty's jade seal was also dedicated to the emperor (Bogd Setsen Khan) by the nobility. When he was presented with the imperial seal of the Yuan dynasty after the defeat of the last Khagan of the Mongols, Hong Taiji renamed his state from "Great Jin" to "Great Qing" and elevated his position from Khan to Emperor, suggesting imperial ambitions beyond unifying the Manchu territories. Hong Taiji then proceeded to invade Korea again in 1636.

The change of name from Jurchen to Manchu was made to hide the fact that the ancestors of the Manchus, the Jianzhou Jurchens, were ruled by the Chinese. The Qing dynasty carefully hid the original editions of the books of "Qing Taizu Wu Huangdi Shilu" and the "Manzhou Shilu Tu" (Taizu Shilu Tu) in the Qing palace, forbidden from public view because they showed that the Manchu Aisin Gioro family had been ruled by the Ming dynasty and followed many Manchu customs that seemed "uncivilized" to later observers. The Qing also deliberately excluded references and information that showed the Jurchens (Manchus) as subservient to the Ming dynasty, from the History of Ming to hide their former subservient relationship to the Ming. The Veritable Records of Ming were not used to source content on Jurchens during Ming rule in the History of Ming because of this.

In the Ming period, the Koreans of Joseon referred to the Jurchen-inhabited lands north of the Korean peninsula, above the rivers Yalu and Tumen to be part of Ming China, as the "superior country" (sangguk) which they called Ming China. After the Second Manchu invasion of Korea, Joseon Korea was forced to give several of their royal princesses as concubines to the Qing Manchu regent Prince Dorgon. In 1650, Dorgon married the Korean Princess Uisun.

This was followed by the creation of the first two Han Banners in 1637 (increasing to eight in 1642). Together these military reforms enabled Hong Taiji to resoundingly defeat Ming forces in a series of battles from 1640 to 1642 for the territories of Songshan and Jinzhou. This final victory resulted in the surrender of many of the Ming dynasty's most battle-hardened troops, the death of Yuan Chonghuan at the hands of the Chongzhen Emperor (who thought Yuan had betrayed him), and the complete and permanent withdrawal of the remaining Ming forces north of the Great Wall.

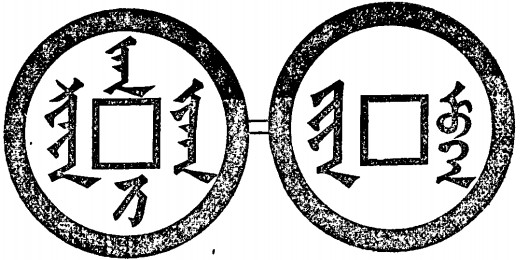
Sura han ni chiha (Coins of Tiancong Khan) in Manchu alphabet

Meanwhile, Hong Taiji set up a rudimentary bureaucratic system based on the Ming model. He established six boards or executive level ministries in 1631 to oversee finance, personnel, rites, military, punishments, and public works. However, these administrative organs had very little role initially, and it was not until the eve of completing the conquest ten years later that they fulfilled their government roles.

Hong Taiji's bureaucracy was staffed with many Han Chinese, including many newly surrendered Ming officials. The Manchus' continued dominance was ensured by an ethnic quota for top bureaucratic appointments. Hong Taiji's reign also saw a fundamental change of policy towards his Han Chinese subjects. Nurhaci had treated Han in Liaodong differently according to how much grain they had: those with less than 5 to 7 sin were treated badly, while those with more than that amount were rewarded with property. Due to a revolt by Han in Liaodong in 1623, Nurhaci, who previously gave concessions to conquered Han subjects in Liaodong, turned against them and ordered that they no longer be trusted. He enacted discriminatory policies and killings against them, while ordering that Han who assimilated to the Jurchen (in Jilin) before 1619 be treated equally, as Jurchens were, and not like the conquered Han in Liaodong. Hong Taiji recognized that the Manchus needed to attract Han Chinese, explaining to reluctant Manchus why he needed to treat the Ming defector General Hong Chengchou leniently. Hong Taiji instead incorporated them into the Jurchen "nation" as full (if not first-class) citizens, obligated to provide military service. By 1648, less than one-sixth of the bannermen were of Manchu ancestry. This change of policy not only increased Hong Taiji's manpower and reduced his military dependence on banners not under his personal control, it also greatly encouraged other Han Chinese subjects of the Ming dynasty to surrender and accept Jurchen rule when they were defeated militarily. Through these and other measures Hong Taiji was able to centralize power unto the office of the Khan, which in the long run prevented the Jurchen federation from fragmenting after his death.

== Claiming the Mandate of Heaven ==
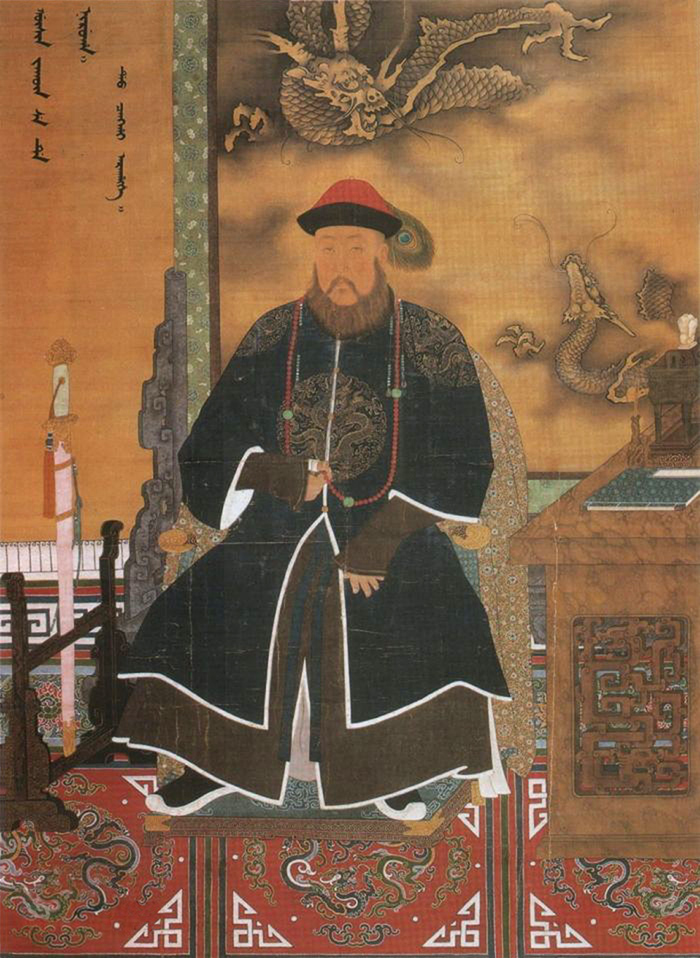
Dorgon (1612–1650)

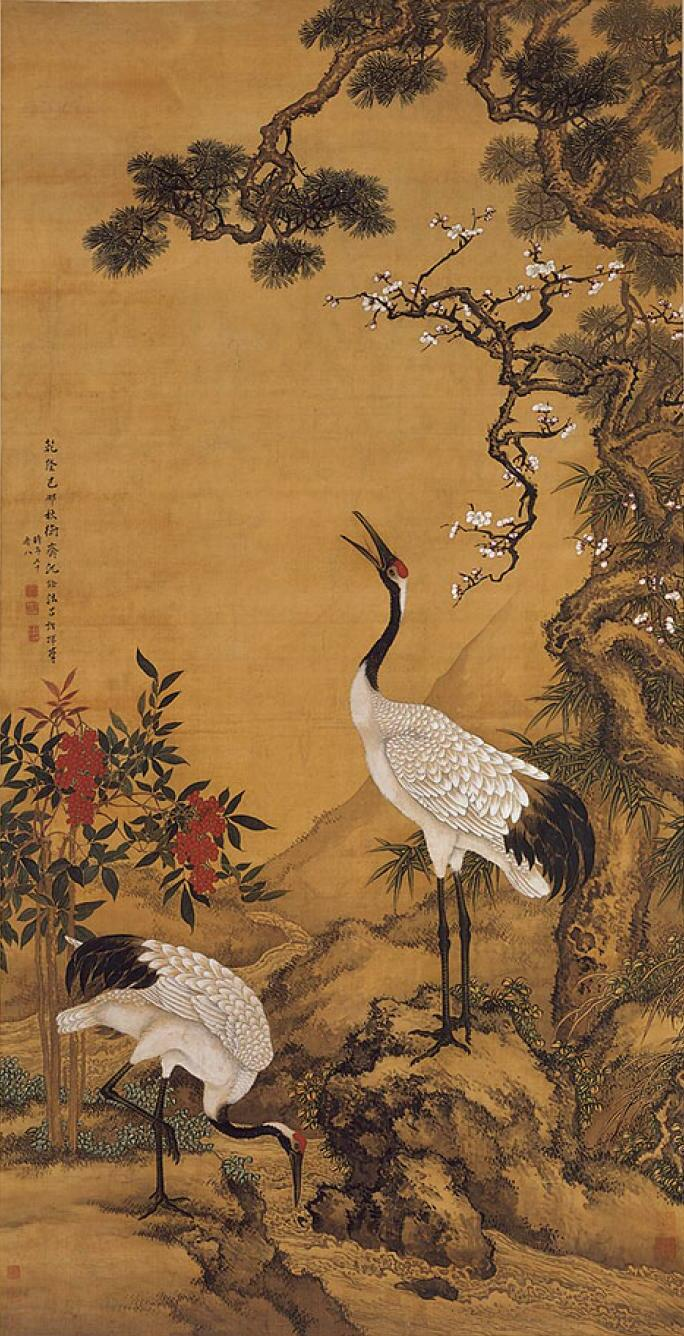
Pine, Plum and Cranes, 1759, by Shen Quan (1682–1760). Hanging scroll, ink and colour on silk. The Palace Museum, Beijing

Hong Taiji died suddenly in September 1643. As the Jurchens had traditionally "elected" their leader through a council of nobles, the Qing state did not have a clear succession system. The leading contenders for power were Hong Taiji's oldest son Hooge and Hong Taiji's half brother Dorgon. A compromise installed Hong Taiji's five-year-old son, Fulin, as the Shunzhi Emperor, with Dorgon as regent and de facto leader of the Manchu nation.

Meanwhile, Ming government officials fought against each other, against fiscal collapse, and against a series of peasant rebellions. They were unable to capitalise on the Manchu succession dispute and the presence of a minor as emperor. In April 1644, the capital, Beijing, was sacked by a coalition of rebel forces led by Li Zicheng, a former minor Ming official, who established a short-lived Shun dynasty. The last Ming ruler, the Chongzhen Emperor, committed suicide when the city fell to the rebels, marking the official end of the dynasty.

Li Zicheng then led a collection of rebel forces numbering some 200,000 to confront Wu Sangui, the general commanding the Ming garrison at Shanhai Pass, a key pass of the Great Wall, located 80 kilometres (50 miles) northeast of Beijing, which defended the capital. Wu Sangui, caught between a rebel army twice his size and an enemy he had fought for years, cast his lot with the foreign but familiar Manchus. Wu Sangui may have been influenced by Li Zicheng's mistreatment of wealthy and cultured officials, including Li's own family; it was said that Li took Wu's concubine Chen Yuanyuan for himself. Wu and Dorgon allied in the name of avenging the death of the Chongzhen Emperor. Together, the two former enemies met and defeated Li Zicheng's rebel forces in battle on May 27, 1644.

The newly allied armies captured Beijing on 6 June. The Shunzhi Emperor was invested as the "Son of Heaven" on 30 October. The Manchus, who had positioned themselves as political heirs to the Ming emperor by defeating Li Zicheng, completed the symbolic transition by holding a formal funeral for the Chongzhen Emperor. However, conquering the rest of China Proper took another seventeen years of battling Ming loyalists, pretenders and rebels. The last Ming pretender, Prince Gui, sought refuge with the King of Burma, Pindale Min, but was turned over to a Qing expeditionary army commanded by Wu Sangui, who had him brought back to Yunnan province and executed in early 1662.

The Qing had taken shrewd advantage of Ming civilian government discrimination against the military and encouraged the Ming military to defect by spreading the message that the Manchus valued their skills. Banners made up of Han Chinese who defected before 1644 were classed among the Eight Banners, giving them social and legal privileges in addition to being acculturated to Manchu traditions. Han defectors swelled the ranks of the Eight Banners so greatly that ethnic Manchus became a minority—only 16% in 1648, with Han Bannermen dominating at 75% and Mongol Bannermen making up the rest. Gunpowder weapons like muskets and artillery were wielded by the Chinese Banners. Normally, Han Chinese defector troops were deployed as the vanguard, while Manchu Bannermen acted as reserve forces or in the rear and were used predominantly for quick strikes with maximum impact, so as to minimize ethnic Manchu losses.

This multi-ethnic Qing force conquered China proper, and the three Liaodong Han Bannermen officers who played key roles in the conquest of southern China were Shang Kexi, Geng Zhongming, and Kong Youde, who governed southern China autonomously as viceroys for the Qing after the conquest. Han Chinese Bannermen made up the majority of governors in the early Qing, and they governed and administered China after the conquest, stabilizing Qing rule. Han Bannermen dominated the post of governor-general in the time of the Shunzhi and Kangxi Emperors, and also the post of governor, largely excluding ordinary Han civilians from these posts.

To promote ethnic harmony, a 1648 decree allowed Han Chinese civilian men to marry Manchu women from the Banners with the permission of the Board of Revenue if they were registered daughters of officials or commoners, or with the permission of their banner company captain if they were unregistered commoners. Later in the dynasty the policies allowing intermarriage were done away with.

The southern cadet branch of Confucius' descendants who held the title Wujing boshi (Doctor of the Five Classics) and 65th generation descendant in the northern branch who held the title Duke Yansheng both had their titles confirmed by the Shunzhi Emperor upon the Qing entry into Beijing on 31 October. The Kong's title of Duke was maintained in later reigns.

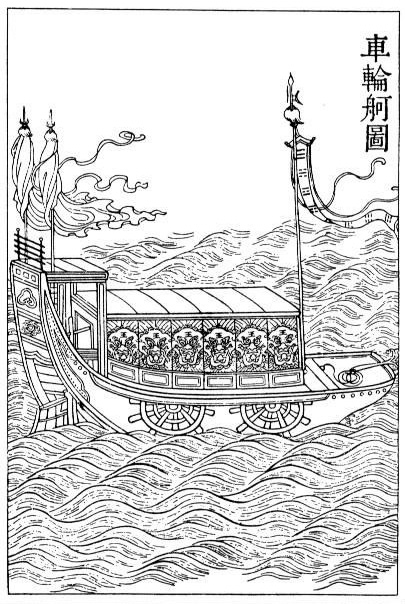
A Chinese paddle-wheel driven ship from a Qing encyclopedia published in 1726

The first seven years of the Shunzhi Emperor's reign were dominated by the regent prince Dorgon. Because of his own political insecurity, Dorgon followed Hong Taiji's example by ruling in the name of the emperor at the expense of rival Manchu princes, many of whom he demoted or imprisoned under one pretext or another. Although the period of his regency was relatively short, Dorgon's precedents and example cast a long shadow over the dynasty.

First, the Manchus had entered "South of the Wall" because Dorgon responded decisively to Wu Sangui's appeal. Then, after capturing Beijing, instead of sacking the city as the rebels had done, Dorgon insisted, over the protests of other Manchu princes, on making it the dynastic capital and reappointing most Ming officials. Choosing Beijing as the capital had not been a straightforward decision, since no major Chinese dynasty had directly taken over its immediate predecessor's capital. Keeping the Ming capital and bureaucracy intact helped quickly stabilize the regime and sped up the conquest of the rest of the country. Dorgon then drastically reduced the influence of the eunuchs, a major force in the Ming bureaucracy, and directed Manchu women not to bind their feet in the Chinese style.

However, not all of Dorgon's policies were equally popular or as easy to implement. The controversial July 1645 edict (the "haircutting order") forced adult Han Chinese men to shave the front of their heads and comb the remaining hair into the queue hairstyle which was worn by Manchu men, on pain of death. The popular description of the order was: "To keep the hair, you lose the head; To keep your head, you cut the hair." To the Manchus, this policy was a test of loyalty and an aid in distinguishing friend from foe. For the Han Chinese, however, it was a humiliating reminder of Qing authority that challenged traditional Confucian values. The Classic of Filial Piety (Xiaojing) held that "a person's body and hair, being gifts from one's parents, are not to be damaged". Under the Ming dynasty, adult men did not cut their hair but instead wore it in the form of a top-knot. The order triggered strong resistance to Qing rule in Jiangnan and massive killing of Han Chinese. It was Han Chinese defectors who carried out massacres against people refusing to wear the queue. Li Chengdong, a Han Chinese general who had served the Ming but surrendered to the Qing, ordered his Han troops to carry out three separate massacres in the city of Jiading within a month, resulting in tens of thousands of deaths. At the end of the third massacre, there was hardly a living person left in this city. Jiangyin also held out against about 10,000 Han Chinese Qing troops for 83 days. When the city wall was finally breached on 9 October 1645, the Han Chinese Qing army led by the Han Chinese Ming defector Liu Liangzuo (劉良佐), who had been ordered to "fill the city with corpses before you sheathe your swords", massacred the entire population, killing between 74,000 and 100,000 people.

Han Chinese did not object to wearing the queue braid on the back of the head, as they traditionally wore all their hair long, but fiercely objected to shaving the forehead, which the Qing government focused on. Han rebels in the first half of the Qing wore the braid but defied orders to shave the front of the head. One person was executed for refusing to shave the front but he had willingly braided the back of his hair. Later westernized revolutionaries, influenced by western hairstyle began to view the braid as backward and advocated adopting short haired western hairstyles. Han rebels, such as the Taiping, even retained their queue braids but grew hair on the front of the head. The Qing government accordingly viewed shaving the front of the head as the primary sign of loyalty, rather than the braid on the back, which traditional Han did not object to. Koxinga insulted and criticized the Qing hairstyle by referring to the shaven pate as looking like a fly. Koxinga and his men objected when the Qing demanded they shave in exchange for recognizing Koxinga as a feudatory. The Qing demanded that Zheng Jing and his men on Taiwan shave in order to receive recognition as a fiefdom. His men and Ming prince Zhu Shugui fiercely objected to shaving.

On 31 December 1650, Dorgon suddenly died during a hunting expedition, marking the official start of the Shunzhi Emperor's personal rule. Because the emperor was only 12 years old at that time, most decisions were made on his behalf by his mother, Empress Dowager Xiaozhuang, who turned out to be a skilled political operator.

Although his support had been essential to Shunzhi's ascent, Dorgon had centralised so much power in his hands as to become a direct threat to the throne. So much so that upon his death he was bestowed the extraordinary posthumous title of Emperor Yi (Chinese: 義皇帝), the only instance in Qing history in which a Manchu "prince of the blood" (Chinese: 親王) was so honored. Two months into Shunzhi's personal rule, however, Dorgon was not only stripped of his titles but his corpse was disinterred and mutilated (Note: This event was recorded by Italian Jesuit Martin Martinius in his account Bellum Tartaricum with original text in Latin, first published in Rome 1654. First English edition, London: John Crook, 1654.) to atone for multiple "crimes", one of which was persecuting to death Shunzhi's agnate eldest brother, Hooge. More importantly, Dorgon's symbolic fall from grace also led to the purge of his family and associates at court, thus reverting power back to the person of the emperor. After a promising start, Shunzhi's reign was cut short by his early death in 1661 at the age of 24 from smallpox. He was succeeded by his third son Xuanye, who reigned as the Kangxi Emperor.

The Manchus sent Han Bannermen to fight against Koxinga's Ming loyalists in Fujian. They removed the population from coastal areas in order to deprive Koxinga's Ming loyalists of resources. This led to a misunderstanding that Manchus were "afraid of water". Han Bannermen carried out the fighting and killing, casting doubt on the claim that fear of the water led to the coastal evacuation and ban on maritime activities. Even though a poem refers to the soldiers carrying out massacres in Fujian as "barbarians", both Han Green Standard Army and Han Bannermen were involved and carried out the worst slaughter. 400,000 Green Standard Army soldiers were used against the Three Feudatories in addition to the 200,000 Bannermen.

== Kangxi Emperor's reign and consolidation ==
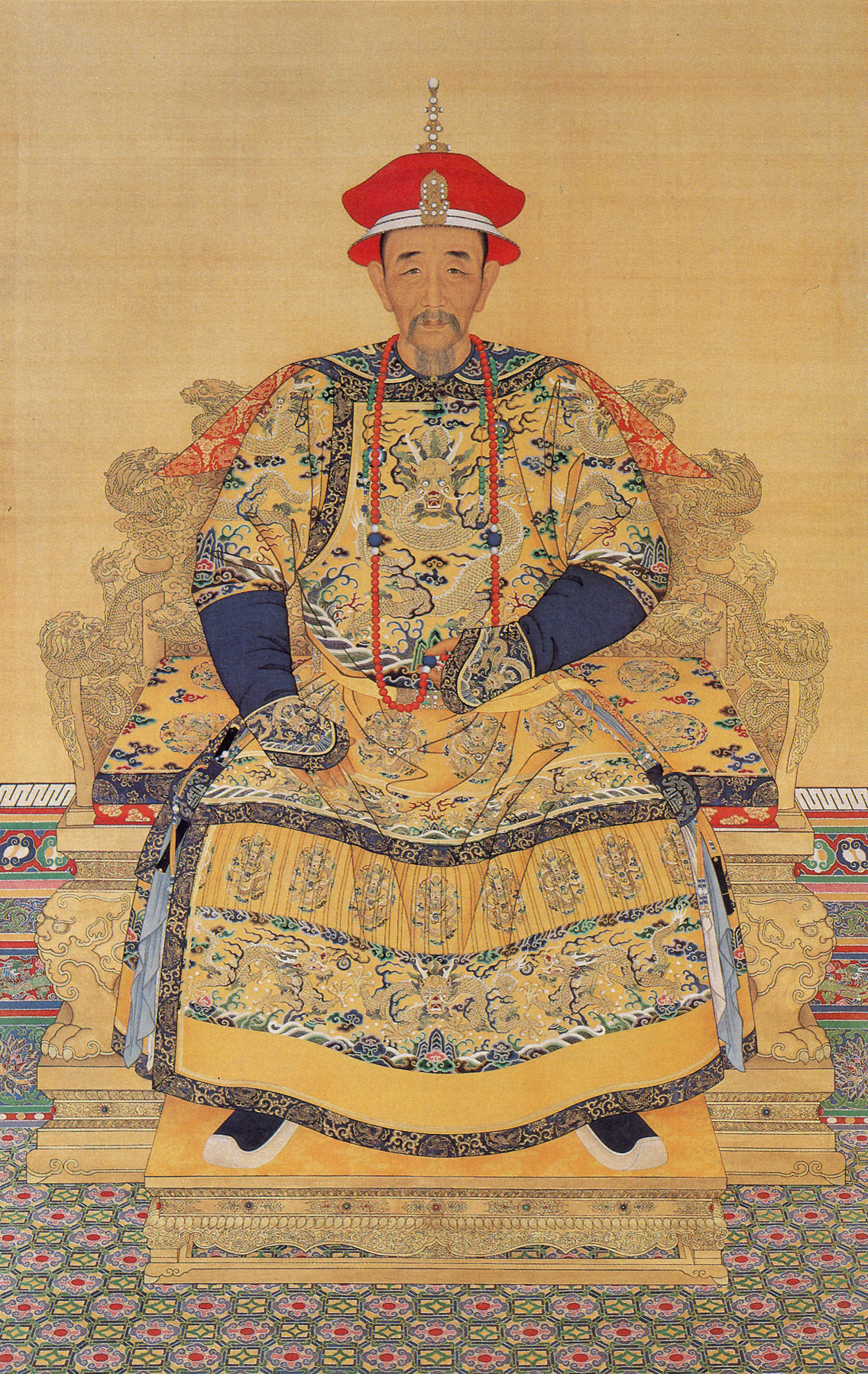
The Kangxi Emperor (r. 1662–1722)

The sixty-one year reign of the Kangxi Emperor was the longest of any Chinese emperor. Kangxi's reign is also celebrated as the beginning of an era known as the "High Qing", during which the dynasty reached the zenith of its social, economic and military power. Kangxi's long reign started when he was eight years old upon the untimely demise of his father. To prevent a repeat of Dorgon's dictatorial monopolizing of power during the regency, the Shunzhi Emperor, on his deathbed, hastily appointed four senior cabinet ministers to govern on behalf of his young son. The four ministers – Sonin, Ebilun, Suksaha, and Oboi – were chosen for their long service, but also to counteract each other's influences. Most important, the four were not closely related to the imperial family and laid no claim to the throne. However, as time passed, through chance and machination, Oboi, the most junior of the four, achieved such political dominance as to be a potential threat. Even though Oboi's loyalty was never an issue, his personal arrogance and political conservatism led him into an escalating conflict with the young emperor. In 1669 Kangxi, through trickery, disarmed and imprisoned Oboi – a significant victory for a fifteen-year-old emperor over a wily politician and experienced commander.

The early Manchu rulers established two foundations of legitimacy that help to explain the stability of their dynasty. The first was the bureaucratic institutions and the neo-Confucian culture that they adopted from earlier dynasties. Manchu rulers and Han Chinese scholar-official elites gradually came to terms with each other. The examination system offered a path for ethnic Han to become officials. Imperial patronage of Kangxi Dictionary demonstrated respect for Confucian learning, while the Sacred Edict of 1670 effectively extolled Confucian family values. His attempts to discourage Chinese women from foot binding, however, were unsuccessful.

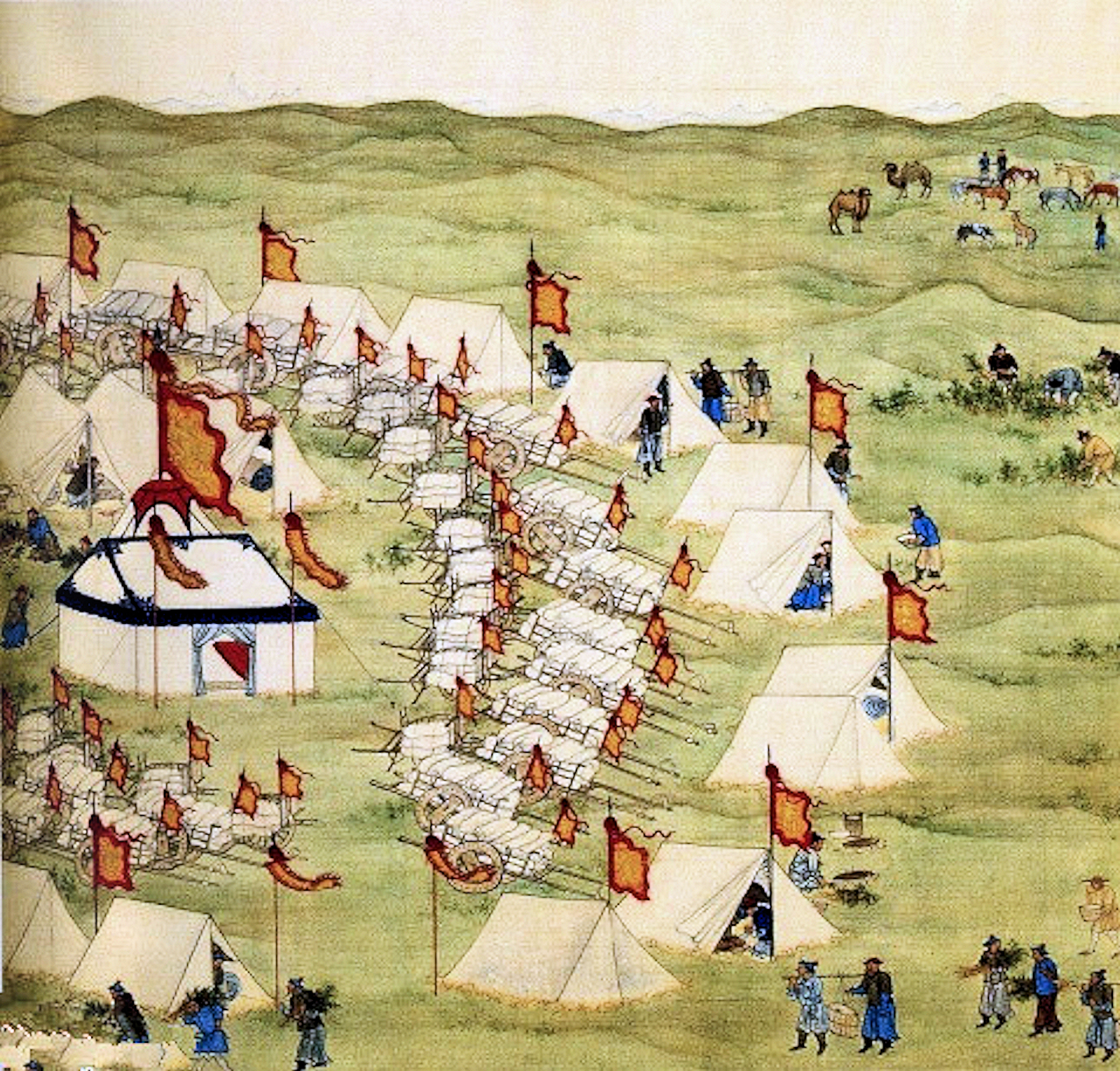
Camp of the Manchu army in Khalkha in 1688

The second major source of stability was the Inner Asian aspect of their Manchu identity, which allowed them to appeal to the Mongol, Tibetan and Muslim subjects in the empire, and the Qing had used different ways of legitimization for these subjects, especially for the Mongols. This contradicted traditional Chinese worldview requiring acculturation of "barbarians". Qing emperors, on the contrary, sought to prevent this in regard to those subjects. The Qing used the title of Emperor (Huangdi or hūwangdi) in Chinese and Manchu (along with titles like the Son of Heaven and Ejen), and among Tibetans the Qing emperor was referred to as the "Emperor of China" (or "Chinese Emperor") and "the Great Emperor" (or "Great Emperor Manjushri"), such as in the 1856 Treaty of Thapathali, while among Mongols the Qing monarch was referred to as Bogda Khan or "(Manchu) Emperor", and among Muslim subjects in Inner Asia the Qing ruler was referred to as the "Khagan of China" (or "Chinese khagan"). The Qianlong Emperor portrayed the image of himself as a Buddhist sage ruler, a patron of Tibetan Buddhism in the hope to appease the Mongols and Tibetans. The Kangxi Emperor also welcomed to his court Jesuit missionaries, who had first come to China under the Ming. Missionaries including Tomás Pereira, Martino Martini, Johann Adam Schall von Bell, Ferdinand Verbiest and Antoine Thomas held significant positions as military weapons experts, mathematicians, cartographers, astronomers and advisers to the emperor. The relationship of trust was however lost in the later Chinese Rites controversy.

Yet controlling the "Mandate of Heaven" was a daunting task. The vastness of China's territory meant that there were only enough banner troops to garrison key cities forming the backbone of a defense network that relied heavily on surrendered Ming soldiers. In addition, three surrendered Ming generals were singled out for their contributions to the establishment of the Qing dynasty, ennobled as feudal princes (藩王), and given governorships over vast territories in Southern China. The chief of these was Wu Sangui, who was given the provinces of Yunnan and Guizhou, while generals Shang Kexi and Geng Jingzhong were given Guangdong and Fujian provinces respectively.

As the years went by, the three feudal lords and their extensive territories became increasingly autonomous. Finally, in 1673, Shang Kexi petitioned Kangxi for permission to retire to his hometown in Liaodong province and nominated his son as his successor. The young emperor granted his retirement, but denied the heredity of his fief. In reaction, the two other generals decided to petition for their own retirements to test Kangxi's resolve, thinking that he would not risk offending them. The move backfired as the young emperor called their bluff by accepting their requests and ordering that all three fiefdoms to be reverted to the crown.

Faced with the stripping of their powers, Wu Sangui, later joined by Geng Zhongming and by Shang Kexi's son Shang Zhixin, felt they had no choice but to revolt. The ensuing Revolt of the Three Feudatories lasted for eight years. Wu attempted, ultimately in vain, to fire the embers of south China Ming loyalty by restoring Ming customs but then declared himself emperor of a new dynasty instead of restoring the Ming. At the peak of the rebels' fortunes, they extended their control as far north as the Yangtze River, nearly establishing a divided China. Wu hesitated to go further north, not being able to coordinate strategy with his allies, and Kangxi was able to unify his forces for a counterattack led by a new generation of Manchu generals. By 1681, the Qing government had established control over a ravaged southern China which took several decades to recover.

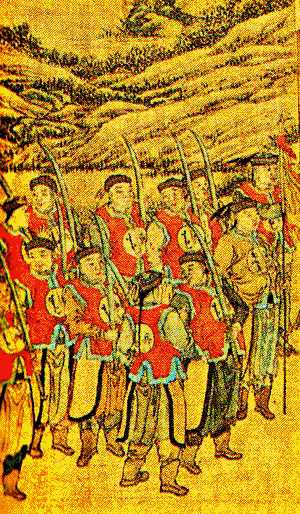
Banners of the 17th century

Manchu Generals and Bannermen were initially put to shame by the better performance of the Han Chinese Green Standard Army. Kangxi accordingly assigned generals Sun Sike, Wang Jinbao, and Zhao Liangdong to crush the rebels, since he thought that Han Chinese were superior to Bannermen at battling other Han people. Similarly, in north-western China against Wang Fuchen, the Qing used Han Chinese Green Standard Army soldiers and Han Chinese generals as the primary military forces. This choice was due to the rocky terrain, which favoured infantry troops over cavalry, to the desire to keep Bannermen in reserve, and, again, to the belief that Han troops were better at fighting other Han people. These Han generals achieved victory over the rebels. Also due to the mountainous terrain, Sichuan and southern Shaanxi were retaken by the Green Standard Army in 1680, with Manchus participating only in logistics and provisions. 400,000 Green Standard Army soldiers and 150,000 Bannermen served on the Qing side during the war. 213 Han Chinese Banner companies, and 527 companies of Mongol and Manchu Banners were mobilized by the Qing during the revolt. 400,000 Green Standard Army soldiers were used against the Three Feudatories besides 200,000 Bannermen.

The Qing forces were crushed by Wu from 1673 to 1674. The Qing had the support of the majority of Han Chinese soldiers and Han elite against the Three Feudatories, since they refused to join Wu Sangui in the revolt, while the Eight Banners and Manchu officers fared poorly against Wu Sangui, so the Qing responded with using a massive army of more than 900,000 Han Chinese (non-Banner) instead of the Eight Banners, to fight and crush the Three Feudatories. Wu Sangui's forces were crushed by the Green Standard Army, made out of defected Ming soldiers.

To extend and consolidate the dynasty's control in Central Asia, the Kangxi Emperor personally led a series of military campaigns against the Dzungars in Outer Mongolia. The Kangxi Emperor was able to successfully expel Galdan's invading forces from these regions, which were then incorporated into the empire. Galdan was eventually killed in the Dzungar–Qing War. In 1683, Qing forces received the surrender of Formosa (Taiwan) from Zheng Keshuang, grandson of Koxinga, who had conquered Taiwan from the Dutch colonists as a base against the Qing. Zheng Keshuang was awarded the title "Duke Haicheng" (海澄公) and was inducted into the Han Chinese Plain Red Banner of the Eight Banners when he moved to Beijing. Several Ming princes had accompanied Koxinga to Taiwan in 1661–1662, including the Prince of Ningjing Zhu Shugui and Prince Zhu Honghuan (朱弘桓), son of Zhu Yihai, where they lived in the Kingdom of Tungning. The Qing sent the 17 Ming princes still living on Taiwan in 1683 back to mainland China where they spent the rest of their lives in exile since their lives were spared from execution. Winning Taiwan freed Kangxi's forces for series of battles over Albazin, the far eastern outpost of the Tsardom of Russia. Zheng's former soldiers on Taiwan like the rattan shield troops were also inducted into the Eight Banners and used by the Qing against Russian Cossacks at Albazin. The 1689 Treaty of Nerchinsk was China's first formal treaty with a European power and kept the border peaceful for the better part of two centuries. After Galdan's death, his followers, as adherents to Tibetan Buddhism, attempted to control the choice of the next Dalai Lama. Kangxi dispatched two armies to Lhasa, the capital of Tibet, and installed a Dalai Lama sympathetic to the Qing.

By the end of the 17th century, China was at its greatest height of confidence and political control since the Ming dynasty.

== Reigns of the Yongzheng and Qianlong emperors ==
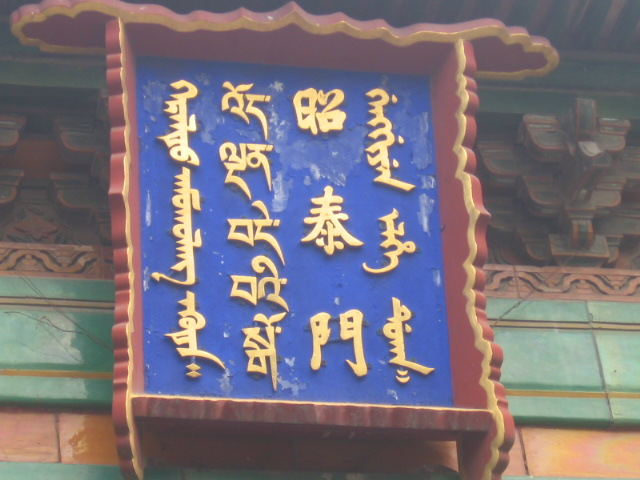
A sign in Mongolian, Tibetan, Chinese and Manchu at the Yonghe monastery in Beijing

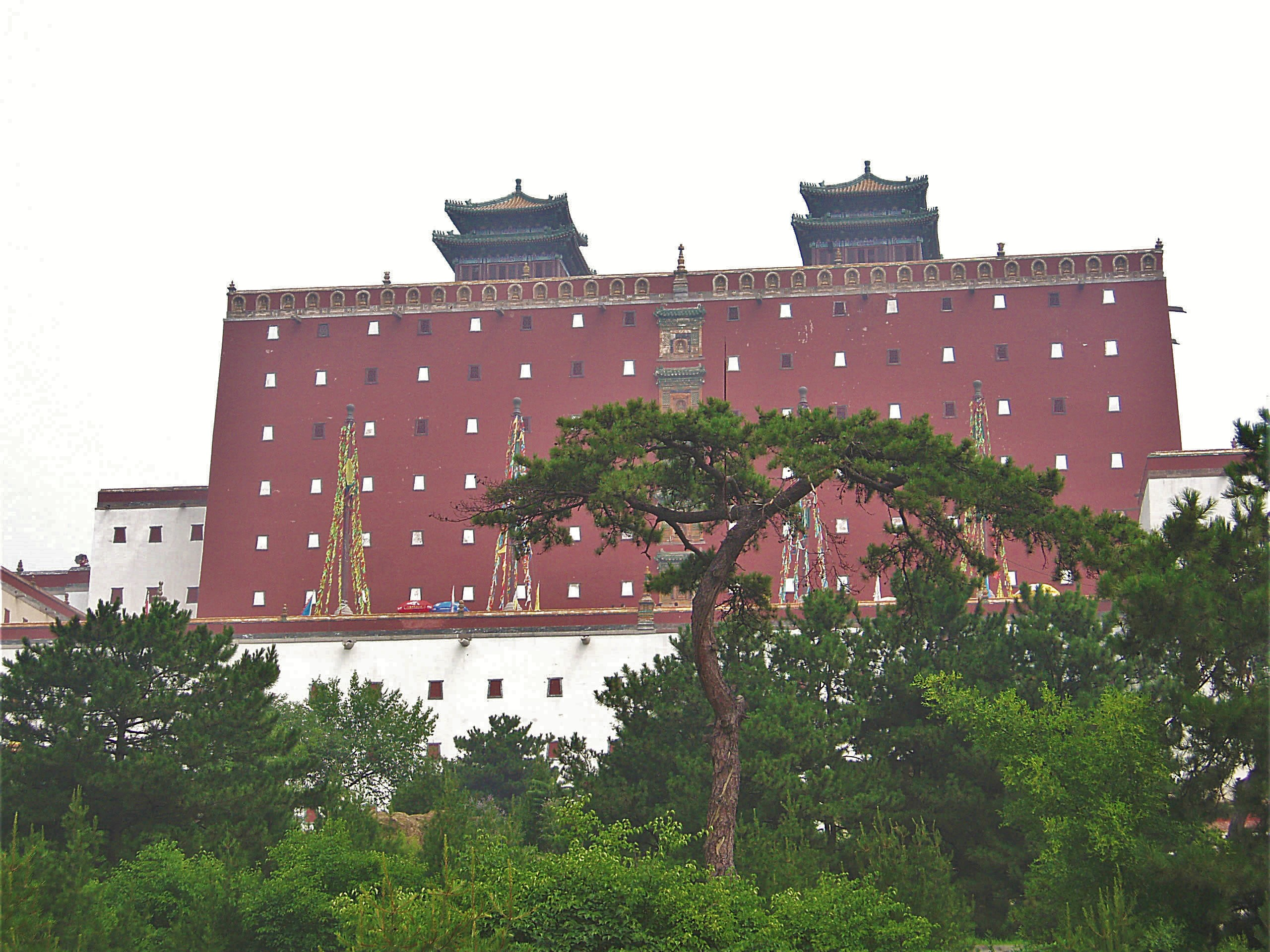
The Putuo Zongcheng Temple of Chengde, built in the 18th century during the reign of the Qianlong Emperor

The reigns of the Yongzheng Emperor (r. 1723–1735) and his son, the Qianlong Emperor (r. 1735–1796), marked the height of Qing power. During this period, the Qing Empire ruled over 13 million square kilometres (5 million square miles) of territory. Yet, as historian Jonathan Spence puts it, the empire by the end of the Qianlong reign was "like the sun at midday". In the midst of "many glories", he writes, "signs of decay and even collapse were becoming apparent".

After the death of the Kangxi Emperor in the winter of 1722, his fourth son, Prince Yong (雍親王), became the Yongzheng Emperor. In the later years of Kangxi's reign, Yongzheng and his brothers had fought, and there were rumours that he had usurped the throne – most of the rumours held that Yongzheng's brother Yingzhen (Kangxi's 14th son) was the real successor of the Kangxi Emperor, and that Yongzheng and his confidant Keduo Long had tampered with the Kangxi's testament on the night when Kangxi died, though there was little evidence for these charges. In fact, his father had trusted him with delicate political issues and discussed state policy with him. When Yongzheng came to power at the age of 45, he felt a sense of urgency about the problems that had accumulated in his father's later years, and he did not need instruction on how to exercise power. In the words of one recent historian, he was "severe, suspicious, and jealous, but extremely capable and resourceful", and in the words of another, he turned out to be an "early modern state-maker of the first order".

Yongzheng moved rapidly. First, he promoted Confucian orthodoxy and reversed what he saw as his father's laxness by cracking down on unorthodox sects and by decapitating an anti-Manchu writer his father had pardoned. In 1723 he outlawed Christianity and expelled Christian missionaries, though some were allowed to remain in the capital. Next, he moved to control the government. He expanded his father's system of Palace Memorials, which brought frank and detailed reports on local conditions directly to the throne without being intercepted by the bureaucracy, and he created a small Grand Council of personal advisors, which eventually grew into the emperor's de facto cabinet for the rest of the dynasty. He shrewdly filled key positions with Manchu and Han Chinese officials who depended on his patronage. When he began to realize that the financial crisis was even greater than he had thought, Yongzheng rejected his father's lenient approach to local landowning elites and mounted a campaign to enforce collection of the land tax. The increased revenues were to be used for "money to nourish honesty" among local officials and for local irrigation, schools, roads, and charity. Although these reforms were effective in the north, in the south and lower Yangzi valley, where Kangxi had wooed the elites, there were long established networks of officials and landowners. Yongzheng dispatched experienced Manchu commissioners to penetrate the thickets of falsified land registers and coded account books, but they were met with tricks, passivity, and even violence. The fiscal crisis persisted.

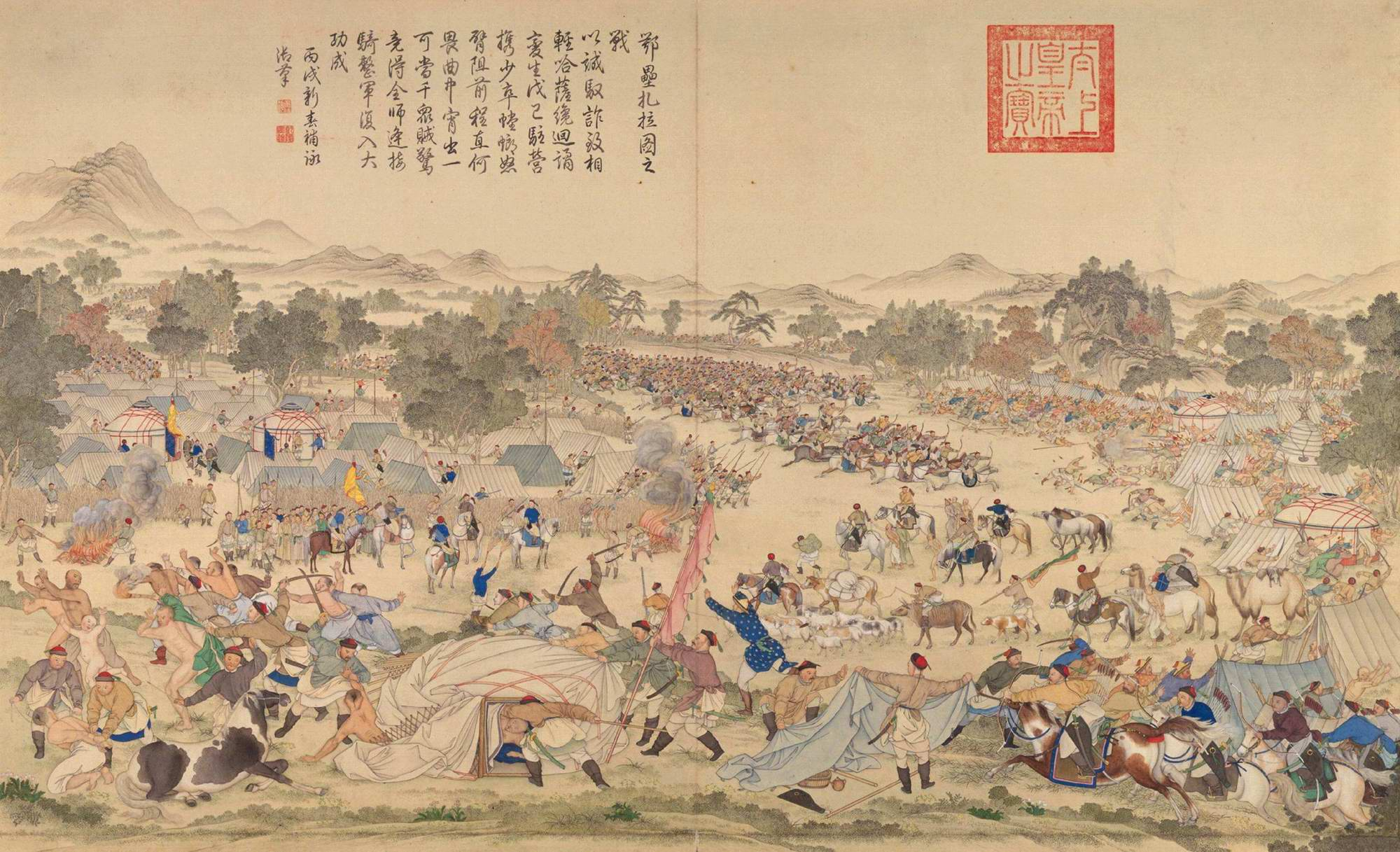
Campaign against the Dzungars and the Qing conquest of Xinjiang between 1755 and 1758

Yongzheng also inherited diplomatic and strategic problems. A team made up entirely of Manchus drew up the Treaty of Kyakhta (1727) to solidify the diplomatic understanding with Russia. In exchange for territory and trading rights, the Qing would have a free hand dealing with the situation in Mongolia. Yongzheng then turned to that situation, where the Dzunghars threatened to re-emerge, and to the southwest, where local Miao chieftains resisted Qing expansion. These campaigns drained the treasury but established the emperor's control of the military and military finance.

The Yongzheng Emperor died in 1735. His 24-year-old son, Prince Bao (寶親王), then became the Qianlong Emperor. Qianlong personally led military campaigns near Xinjiang and Mongolia, putting down revolts and uprisings in Sichuan and parts of southern China while expanding control over Tibet.

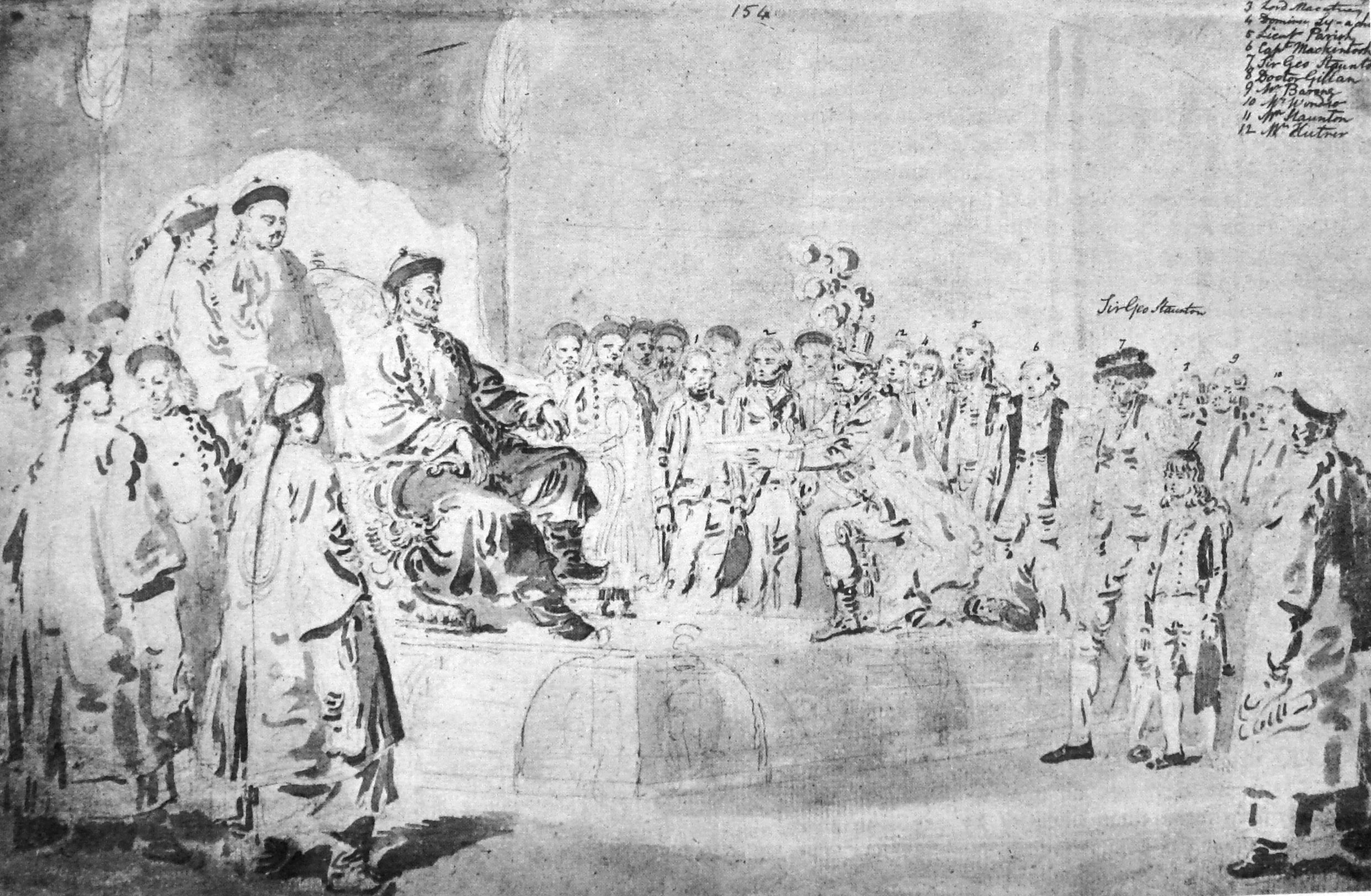
Lord Macartney saluting the Qianlong Emperor

The Qianlong Emperor launched several ambitious cultural projects, including the compilation of the Complete Library of the Four Treasuries, or Siku Quanshu. With a total of over 3,400 books, 79,000 chapters, and 36,304 volumes, the Complete Library of the Four Treasuries is the largest collection of books in Chinese history. Nevertheless, Qianlong used Literary Inquisition to silence opposition. The accusation of individuals began with the emperor's own interpretation of the true meaning of the corresponding words. If the emperor decided these were derogatory or cynical towards the dynasty, persecution would begin. Literary inquisition began with isolated cases at the time of Shunzhi and Kangxi, but became a pattern under Qianlong's rule, during which there were 53 cases of literary persecution.

Beneath outward prosperity and imperial confidence, the later years of Qianlong's reign were marked by rampant corruption and neglect. Heshen, the emperor's handsome young favorite, took advantage of the emperor's indulgence to become one of the most corrupt officials in the history of the dynasty. Qianlong's son, the Jiaqing Emperor (r. 1796–1820), eventually forced Heshen to commit suicide.

In October 1795, the 60th year of his reign, the Qianlong Emperor announced his intention to abdicate in favour of Prince Jia. He made this decision because he felt that it was disrespectful for him to rule longer than his grandfather, the Kangxi Emperor, who was on the throne for 61 years. Prince Jia ascended the throne and adopted the era name "Jiaqing" in February 1796, hence he is historically known as the Jiaqing Emperor. For the next three years however, the Jiaqing Emperor was emperor in name only because decisions were still made by his father, who became a Taishang Huang (emperor emeritus) after his abdication.

After the death of the Qianlong Emperor in the beginning of February 1799, the Jiaqing Emperor took control of the government and prosecuted Heshen, a favourite official of his father. Heshen was charged with corruption and abuse of power, stripped of his titles, had his property confiscated, and ordered to commit suicide. Heshen's daughter-in-law, Princess Hexiao, a half-sister of the Jiaqing Emperor, was spared from punishment and given a few properties from Heshen's estates.

At the time, the Qing Empire faced internal disorder, most importantly the large-scale White Lotus (1796–1804) and Miao (1795–1806) rebellions, as well as an empty imperial treasury. The Jiaqing Emperor engaged in the pacification of the empire and the quelling of rebellions. He endeavored to bring China back to its 18th-century prosperity and power. However, due in part to large outflows of silver from the country as payment for the opium smuggled into China from British India, the economy declined.

The Great Qing Legal Code includes one statute titled "Prohibitions Concerning Sorcerers and Sorceresses" (禁止師巫邪術). In 1811, a clause was added to it with reference to Christianity. It was modified in 1815 and 1817, settled in its final form in 1839 under the Daoguang Emperor, and abrogated in 1870 under the Tongzhi Emperor. It sentenced Europeans to death for spreading Catholicism among Han Chinese and Manchus. Christians who would not repent their conversion were sent to Muslim cities in Xinjiang, to be given as slaves to Muslim leaders and beys.

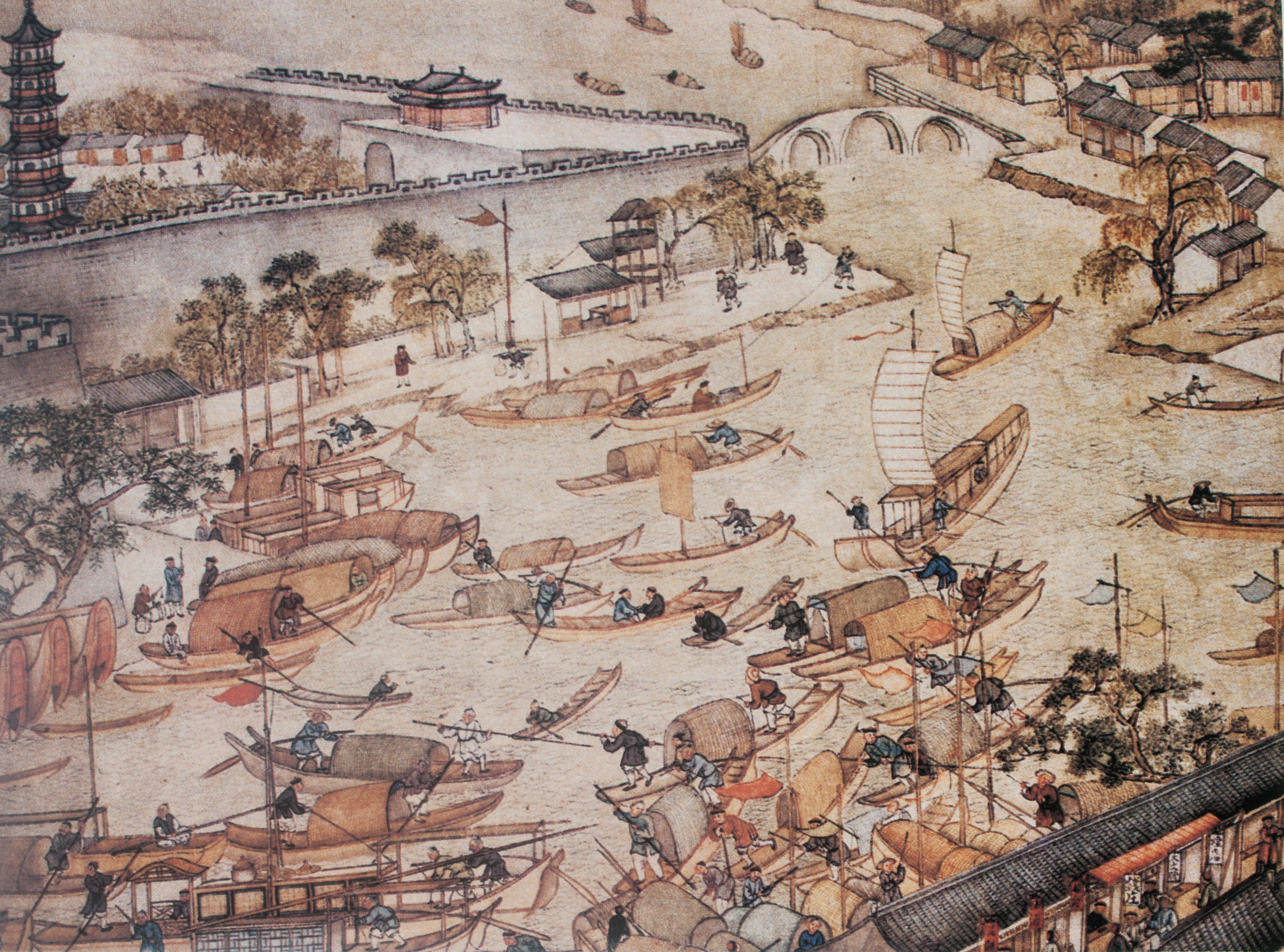
Commerce on the water, Prosperous Suzhou by Xu Yang, 1759

China also began suffering from mounting overpopulation during this period. Population growth was stagnant for the first half of the 17th century due to civil wars and epidemics, but prosperity and internal stability gradually reversed this trend. The introduction of new crops from the Americas such as the potato and peanut allowed an improved food supply as well, so that the total population of China during the 18th century ballooned from 100 million to 300 million people. Soon all available farmland was used up, forcing peasants to work ever-smaller and more intensely worked plots. The Qianlong Emperor once bemoaned the country's situation by remarking, "The population continues to grow, but the land does not." The only remaining part of the empire that had arable farmland was Manchuria, where the provinces of Jilin and Heilongjiang had been walled off as a Manchu homeland. The emperor decreed for the first time that Han Chinese civilians were forbidden to settle. Mongols were forbidden by the Qing from crossing the borders of their banners, even into other Mongol Banners, and from crossing into neidi (the Han Chinese 18 provinces) and were given serious punishments if they did in order to keep the Mongols divided against each other to benefit the Qing. Mongol pilgrims wanting to leave their banner's borders for religious reasons such as pilgrimage had to apply for passports to give them permission.

Select groups of Han Chinese bannermen were mass transferred into Manchu Banners by the Qing, changing their ethnicity from Han Chinese to Manchu. Han Chinese bannermen of Tai Nikan 台尼堪 (watchpost Chinese) and Fusi Nikan 抚顺尼堪 (Fushun Chinese) backgrounds into the Manchu banners in 1740 by order of the Qing Qianlong emperor. It was between 1618 and 1629 when the Han Chinese from Liaodong who later became the Fushun Nikan and Tai Nikan defected to the Jurchens (Manchus). These Han Chinese origin Manchu clans continue to use their original Han surnames and are marked as of Han origin on Qing lists of Manchu clans.

Despite officially prohibiting Han Chinese settlement on the Manchu and Mongol lands, by the 18th century the Qing decided to settle Han refugees from northern China who were suffering from famine, floods, and drought into Manchuria and Inner Mongolia. Han Chinese then streamed into Manchuria, both illegally and legally, over the Great Wall and Willow Palisade. As Manchu landlords desired Han Chinese to rent their land and grow grain, most Han Chinese migrants were not evicted. During the eighteenth century Han Chinese farmed 500,000 hectares of privately owned land in Manchuria and 203,583 hectares of lands that were part of courrier stations, noble estates, and Banner lands. In garrisons and towns in Manchuria Han Chinese made up 80% of the population.

In 1796, open rebellion broke out among followers of the White Lotus Society, who blamed Qing officials, saying "the officials have forced the people to rebel." Officials in other parts of the country were also blamed for corruption, failing to keep the famine relief granaries full, poor maintenance of roads and waterworks, and bureaucratic factionalism. There soon followed uprisings of "new sect" Muslims against local Muslim officials, and Miao tribesmen in southwest China. The White Lotus Rebellion continued for eight years, until 1804, when badly run, corrupt, and brutal campaigns finally ended it.

== Rebellion, unrest and external pressure ==
British Steamship destroying Chinese war junks (E. Duncan) (1843)

At the start of the dynasty, the Chinese empire continued to be the hegemonic power in East Asia. Although there was no formal ministry of foreign relations, the Lifan Yuan was responsible for relations with the Mongol and Tibetans in Central Asia, while the tributary system, a loose set of institutions and customs taken over from the Ming, in theory governed relations with East and Southeast Asian countries. The Treaty of Nerchinsk (1689) stabilized relations with Czarist Russia.

However, during the 18th century European empires gradually expanded across the world, as European states developed economies built on maritime trade, colonial extraction, and advances in technology. The dynasty was confronted with newly developing concepts of the international system and state to state relations. European trading posts expanded into territorial control in nearby India and on the islands that are now Indonesia. The Qing response, successful for a time, was to establish the Canton System in 1756, which restricted maritime trade to that city (modern-day Guangzhou) and gave monopoly trading rights to private Chinese merchants. The British East India Company and the Dutch East India Company had long before been granted similar monopoly rights by their governments.

In 1793, the British East India Company, with the support of the British government, sent a delegation to China under Lord George Macartney in order to open free trade and put relations on a basis of equality. The imperial court viewed trade as of secondary interest, whereas the British saw maritime trade as the key to their economy. The Qianlong Emperor told Macartney "the kings of the myriad nations come by land and sea with all sorts of precious things", and "consequently there is nothing we lack ..."

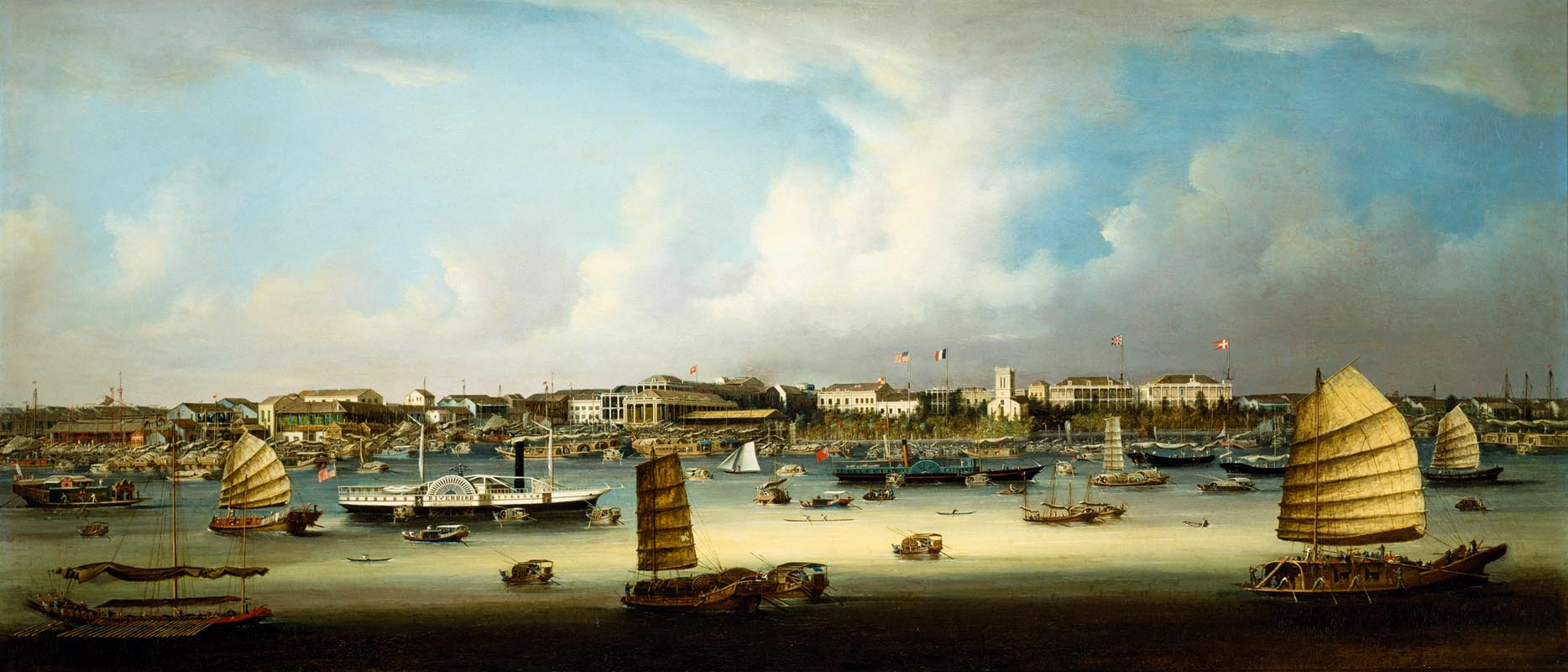
View of the Canton River, showing the Thirteen Factories in the background, 1850–1855

Demand in Europe for Chinese goods such as silk, tea, and ceramics could only be met if European companies funneled their limited supplies of silver into China. In the late 1700s, the governments of Britain and France were deeply concerned about the imbalance of trade and the drain of silver. To meet the growing Chinese demand for opium, the British East India Company greatly expanded its production in Bengal. Since China's economy was essentially self-sufficient, the country had little need to import goods or raw materials from the Europeans, so the usual way of payment was through silver. The Daoguang Emperor, concerned both over the outflow of silver and the damage that opium smoking was causing to his subjects, ordered Lin Zexu to end the opium trade. Lin confiscated the stocks of opium without compensation in 1839, leading Britain to send a military expedition the following year.

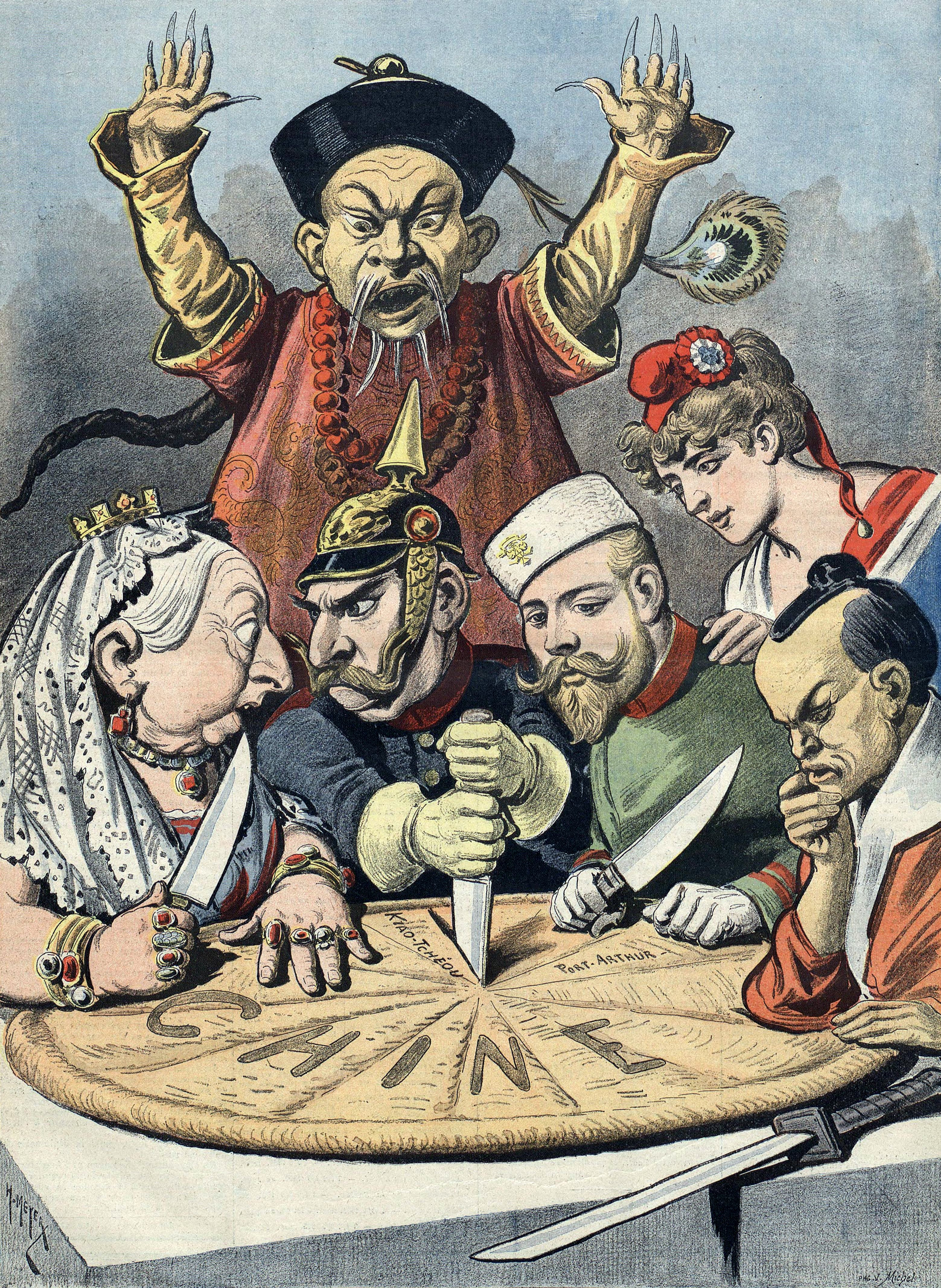
In this political cartoon, Britain, Germany, Russia, France, and Japan are dividing China

The First Opium War revealed the outdated state of the Chinese military. The Qing navy, composed entirely of wooden sailing junks, was severely outclassed by the modern tactics and firepower of the British Royal Navy. British soldiers, using advanced muskets and artillery, easily outmanoeuvred and outgunned Qing forces in ground battles. The Qing surrender in 1842 marked a decisive, humiliating blow to China. The Treaty of Nanjing, the first of the "unequal treaties", demanded war reparations, forced China to open up the Treaty Ports of Canton, Amoy, Fuchow, Ningpo and Shanghai to Western trade and missionaries, and to cede Hong Kong Island to Britain. It revealed weaknesses in the Qing government and provoked rebellions against the regime. In 1842, the Qing dynasty fought a war with the Sikh Empire (the last independent kingdom of India), resulting in a negotiated peace and a return to the status quo ante bellum.

The Taiping Rebellion in the mid-19th century was the first major instance of anti-Manchu sentiment. Amid widespread social unrest and worsening famine, the rebellion not only posed the most serious threat towards Qing rulers, it has also been called the "bloodiest civil war of all time"; during its fourteen-year course from 1850 to 1864 between 20 and 30 million people died. Hong Xiuquan, a failed civil service candidate, in 1851 launched an uprising in Guizhou province, and established the Taiping Heavenly Kingdom with Hong himself as king. Hong announced that he had visions of God and that he was the brother of Jesus Christ. Slavery, concubinage, arranged marriage, opium smoking, footbinding, judicial torture, and the worship of idols were all banned. However, success led to internal feuds, defections and corruption. In addition, British and French troops, equipped with modern weapons, had come to the assistance of the Qing imperial army. It was not until 1864 that Qing armies under Zeng Guofan succeeded in crushing the revolt. After the outbreak of this rebellion, there were also revolts by the Muslims and Miao people of China against the Qing dynasty, most notably in the Miao Rebellion (1854–73) in Guizhou, the Panthay Rebellion (1856–1873) in Yunnan and the Dungan Revolt (1862–77) in the northwest.

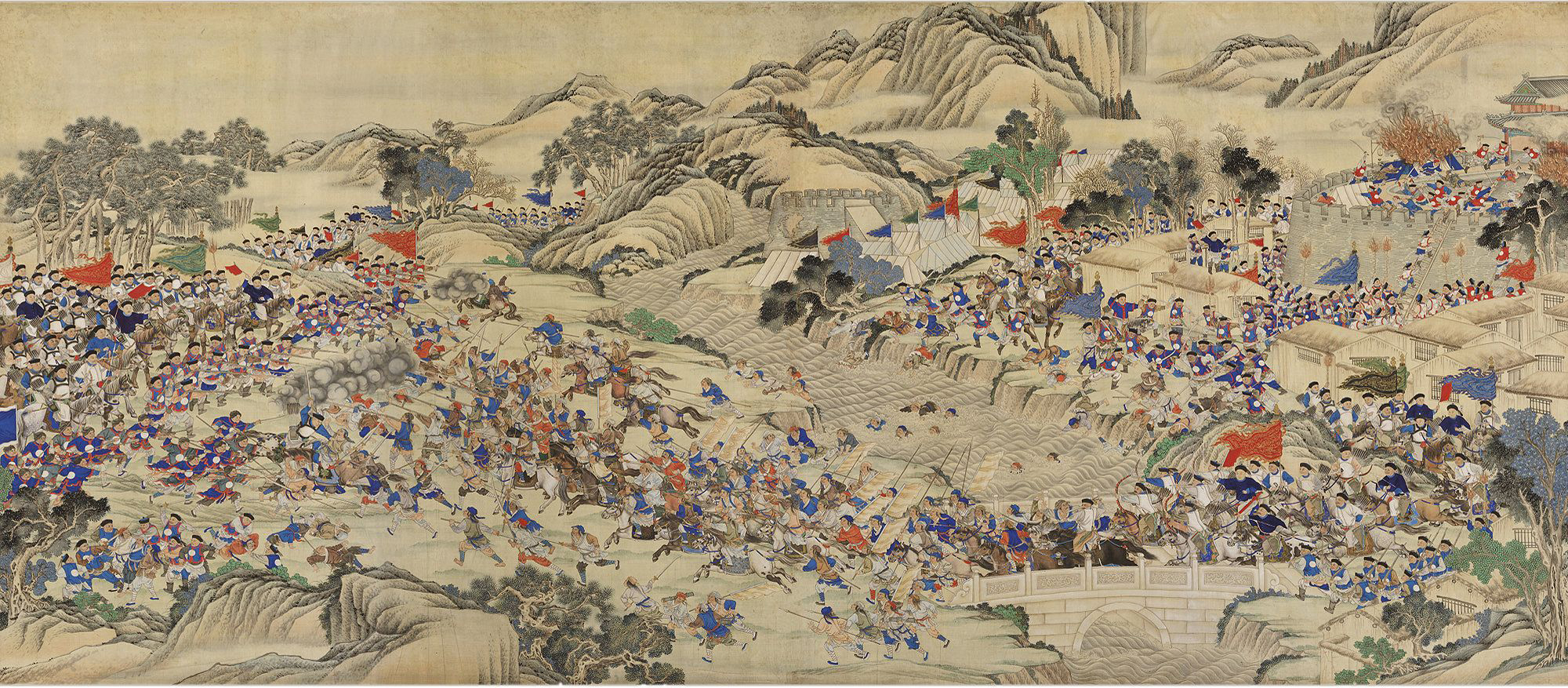
A scene of the Taiping Rebellion, 1850–1864

The Western powers, largely unsatisfied with the Treaty of Nanjing, gave grudging support to the Qing government during the Taiping and Nian Rebellions. China's income fell sharply during the wars as vast areas of farmland were destroyed, millions of lives were lost, and countless armies were raised and equipped to fight the rebels. In 1854, Britain tried to re-negotiate the Treaty of Nanjing, inserting clauses allowing British commercial access to Chinese rivers and the creation of a permanent British embassy at Beijing.

In 1856, Qing authorities, in searching for a pirate, boarded a ship, the Arrow, which the British claimed had been flying the British flag, an incident which led to the Second Opium War. In 1858, facing no other options, the Xianfeng Emperor agreed to the Treaty of Tientsin, which contained clauses deeply insulting to the Chinese, such as a demand that all official Chinese documents be written in English and a proviso granting British warships unlimited access to all navigable Chinese rivers.

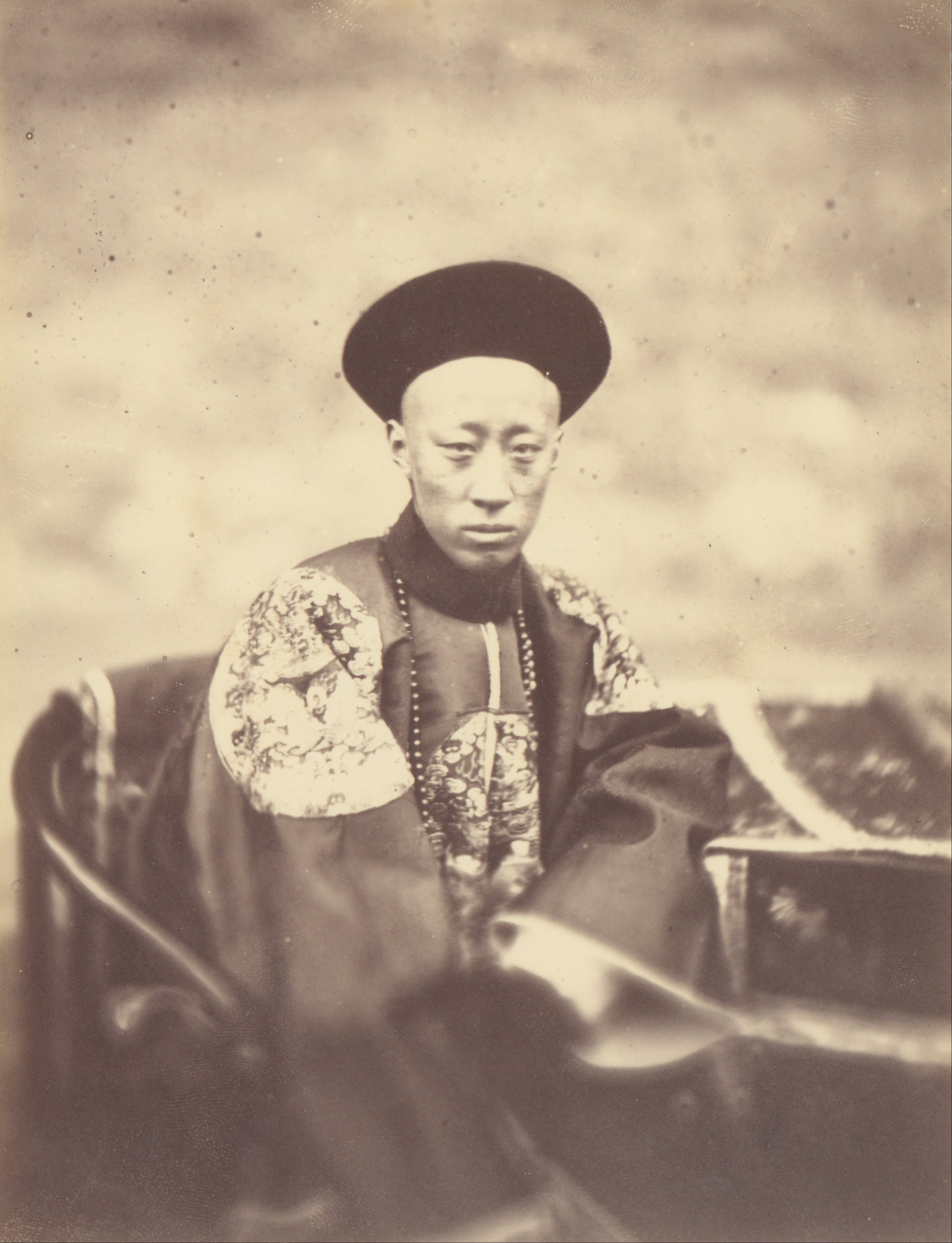
Yixin, Prince Gong

Ratification of the treaty in the following year led to a resumption of hostilities. In 1860, with Anglo-French forces marching on Beijing, the emperor and his court fled the capital for the imperial hunting lodge at Rehe. Once in Beijing, the Anglo-French forces looted the Old Summer Palace and, in an act of revenge for the arrest, torture, and execution of the English diplomatic mission, burnt it to the ground. Prince Gong, a younger half-brother of the emperor, who had been left as his brother's proxy in the capital, was forced to sign the Convention of Beijing. The humiliated emperor died the following year at Rehe.

== Self-strengthening and the frustration of reforms ==
Yet the dynasty rallied. Chinese generals and officials such as Zuo Zongtang led the suppression of rebellions and stood behind the Manchus. When the Tongzhi Emperor came to the throne at the age of five in 1861, these officials rallied around him in what was called the Tongzhi Restoration. Their aim was to adopt Western military technology in order to preserve Confucian values. Zeng Guofan, in alliance with Prince Gong, sponsored the rise of younger officials such as Li Hongzhang, who put the dynasty back on its feet financially and instituted the Self-Strengthening Movement. The reformers then proceeded with institutional reforms, including China's first unified ministry of foreign affairs, the Zongli Yamen; allowing foreign diplomats to reside in the capital; establishment of the Imperial Maritime Customs Service; the formation of modernized armies, such as the Beiyang Army, as well as a navy; and the purchase from Europeans of armament factories.

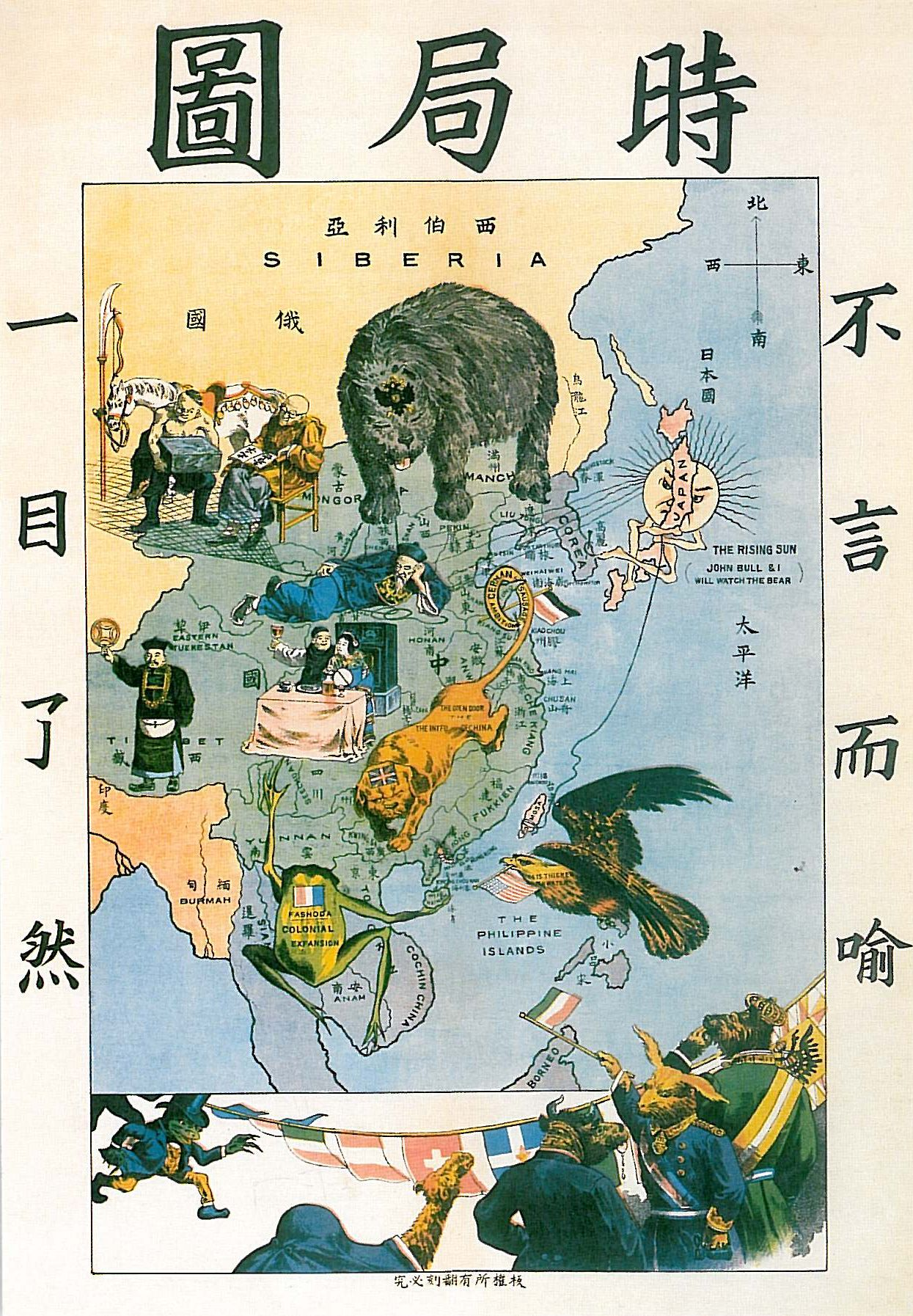
Imperialism 1900: The bear represents Russia, the lion Britain, the frog France, the sun Japan, and the eagle the United States.

The dynasty lost control of peripheral territories bit by bit. In return for promises of support against the British and the French, the Russian Empire took large chunks of territory in the Northeast in 1860. The period of cooperation between the reformers and the European powers ended with the Tientsin Massacre of 1870, which was incited by the murder of French nuns set off by the belligerence of local French diplomats. Starting with the Cochinchina Campaign in 1858, France expanded control of Indochina. By 1883, France was in full control of the region and had reached the Chinese border. The Sino-French War began with a surprise attack by the French on the Chinese southern fleet at Fuzhou. After that the Chinese declared war on the French. A French invasion of Taiwan was halted and the French were defeated on land in Tonkin at the Battle of Bang Bo. However Japan threatened to enter the war against China due to the Gapsin Coup and China chose to end the war with negotiations. The war ended in 1885 with the Treaty of Tientsin (1885) and the Chinese recognition of the French protectorate in Vietnam. Some Russian and Chinese gold miners also established a short-lived proto-state known as the Zheltuga Republic (1883–1886) in the Amur river basin, which was however soon crushed by the Qing forces.

In 1884, Qing China obtained concessions in Korea, such as the Chinese concession of Incheon, but the pro-Japanese Koreans in Seoul led the Gapsin Coup. Tensions between China and Japan rose after China intervened to suppress the uprising. Japanese Prime Minister Itō Hirobumi and Li Hongzhang signed the Convention of Tientsin, an agreement to withdraw troops simultaneously, but the First Sino-Japanese War of 1895 was a military humiliation. The Treaty of Shimonoseki recognized Korean independence and ceded Taiwan and the Pescadores to Japan. The terms might have been harsher, but when a Japanese citizen attacked and wounded Li Hongzhang, an international outcry shamed the Japanese into revising them. The original agreement stipulated the cession of Liaodong Peninsula to Japan, but Russia, with its own designs on the territory, along with Germany and France, in the Triple Intervention, successfully put pressure on the Japanese to abandon the peninsula.

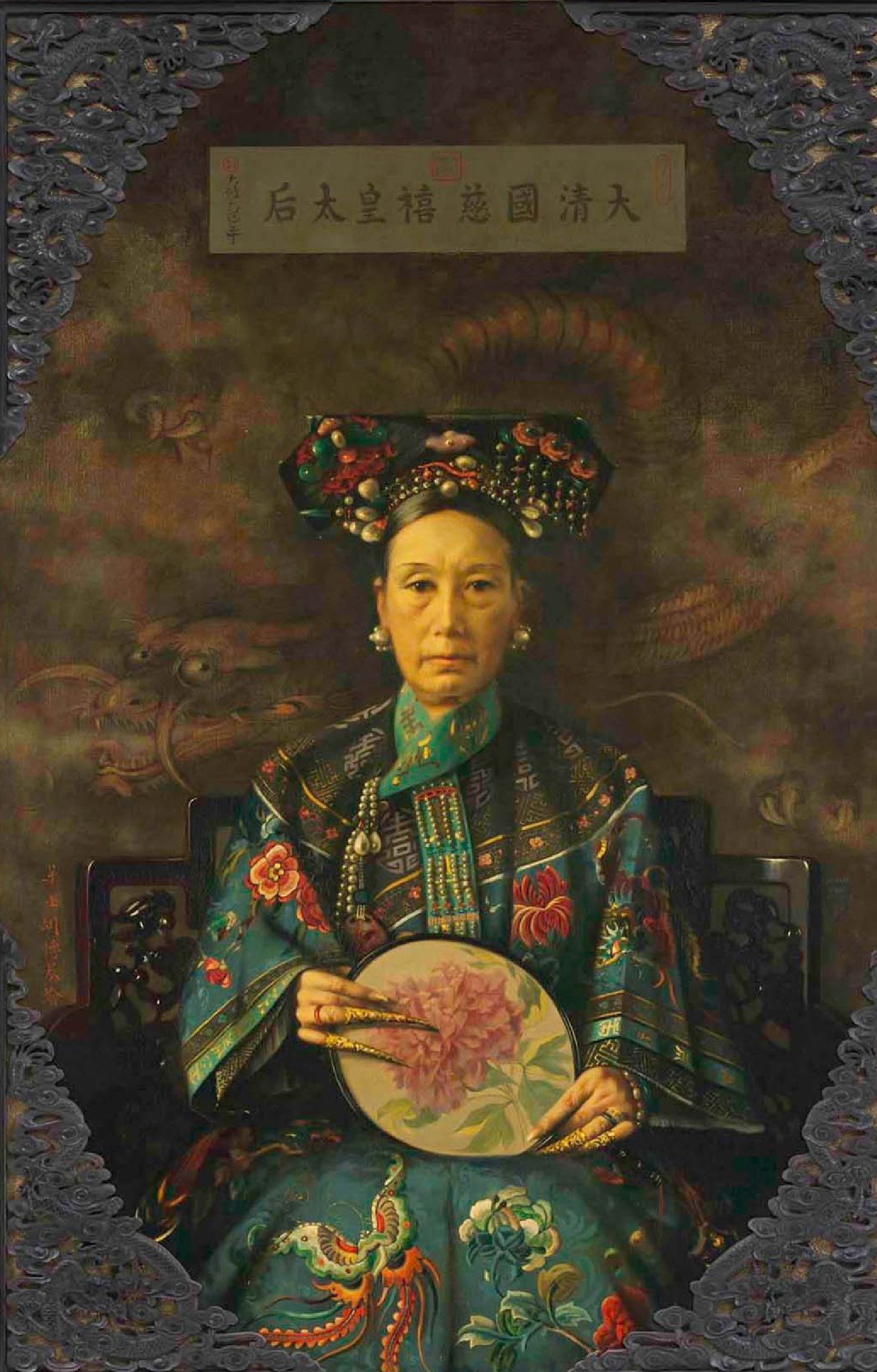
Painting of Empress Dowager Cixi by Dutch American artist Hubert Vos circa 1905

These years saw an evolution in the participation of Empress Dowager Cixi (Wade–Giles: Tz'u-Hsi) in state affairs. She entered the imperial palace in the 1850s as a concubine to the Xianfeng Emperor (r. 1850–1861) and came to power in 1861 after her five-year-old son, the Tongzhi Emperor ascended the throne. She, the Empress Dowager Ci'an (who had been Xianfeng's empress), and Prince Gong (a son of the Daoguang Emperor), staged a coup that ousted several regents for the boy emperor. Between 1861 and 1873, she and Ci'an served as regents, choosing the reign title "Tongzhi" (ruling together). Following the emperor's death in 1875, Cixi's nephew, the Guangxu Emperor, took the throne, in violation of the dynastic custom that the new emperor be of the next generation, and another regency began. In the spring of 1881, Ci'an suddenly died, aged only forty-three, leaving Cixi as sole regent.

From 1889, when Guangxu began to rule in his own right, to 1898, the Empress Dowager lived in semi-retirement, spending the majority of the year at the Summer Palace. On 1 November 1897, two German Roman Catholic missionaries were murdered in the southern part of Shandong province (the Juye Incident). Germany used the murders as a pretext for a naval occupation of Jiaozhou Bay. The occupation prompted a "scramble for concessions" in 1898, which included the German lease of Jiaozhou Bay, the Russian lease of Liaodong, the British lease of the New Territories of Hong Kong, and the French lease of Guangzhouwan.

In the wake of these external defeats, the Guangxu Emperor initiated the Hundred Days' Reform of 1898. Newer, more radical advisers such as Kang Youwei were given positions of influence. The emperor issued a series of edicts and plans were made to reorganize the bureaucracy, restructure the school system, and appoint new officials. Opposition from the bureaucracy was immediate and intense. Although she had been involved in the initial reforms, the Empress Dowager stepped in to call them off, arrested and executed several reformers, and took over day-to-day control of policy. Yet many of the plans stayed in place, and the goals of reform were implanted.

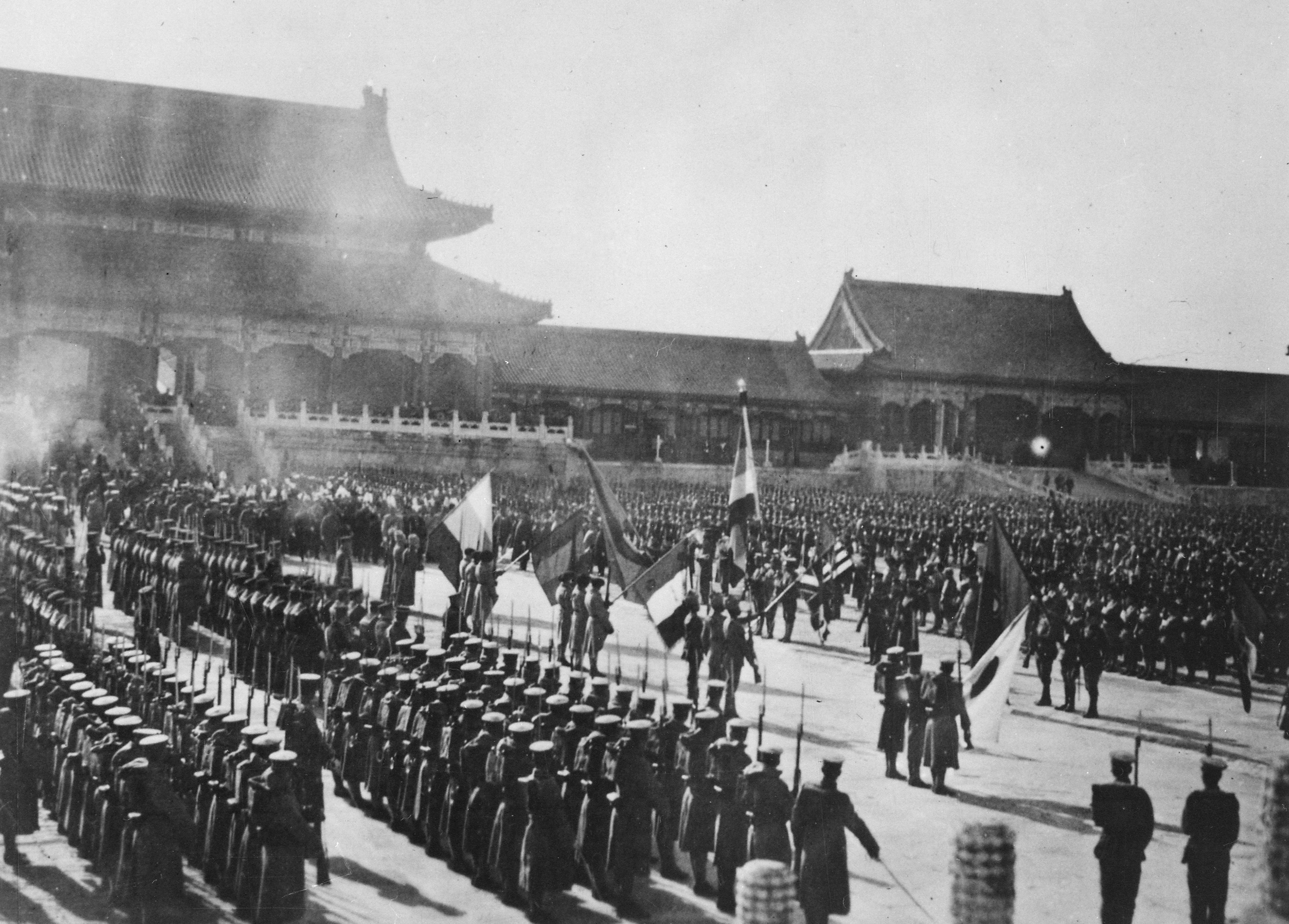
Foreign armies assemble inside the Forbidden City after capturing Beijing, 28 November 1900

=== Boxer Rebellion, 1899-1901 ===
The Boxer Rebellion was a bloody attack from November 1899 to September, 1901 against foreign influence, especially Christian missionaries and their Chinese converts. It affected the northern provinces around Beijing. The Boxer movement—more exactly the Righteous Harmony Society, was an anti-Christian, antimissionary, and antiforeign peasant-based revitalization movement. The Empress Dowager Cixi was pleased when Boxers attacked foreigners who were building railroads, exploiting China's mineral wealth, dividing up the port trading concessions, and converting peasants to an alien religion. In June 1900 the Boxers invaded Beijing and killed 230 foreigners, and tens of thousands of Chinese Christians. The Cixi government was helpless. Diplomats, foreign civilians, soldiers and some Chinese Christians retreated to the legation quarter and held out for 55 days. The world powers formed the ad-hoc Eight-Nation Alliance and rushed in 20,000 troops to the rescue, mostly from Russia, Japan, Britain and the United States. The Boxers and the government forces were more numerous but were very poorly organized and armed. They were quickly defeated, causing the imperial court to flee. The Chinese government was forced to indemnify the Alliance with huge cash penalties spread over decades, and also make many additional concessions. On the one hand, the Boxers have been condemned as a product of uncivilized, irrational, superstitious antiforeignism among the uneducated peasants. On the other, the Boxers are praised as patriotic anti-imperialists. Subsequent reforms laid the foundation for the end of Manchu rule and the establishment of a modern nation.

== Reform, revolution, collapse ==
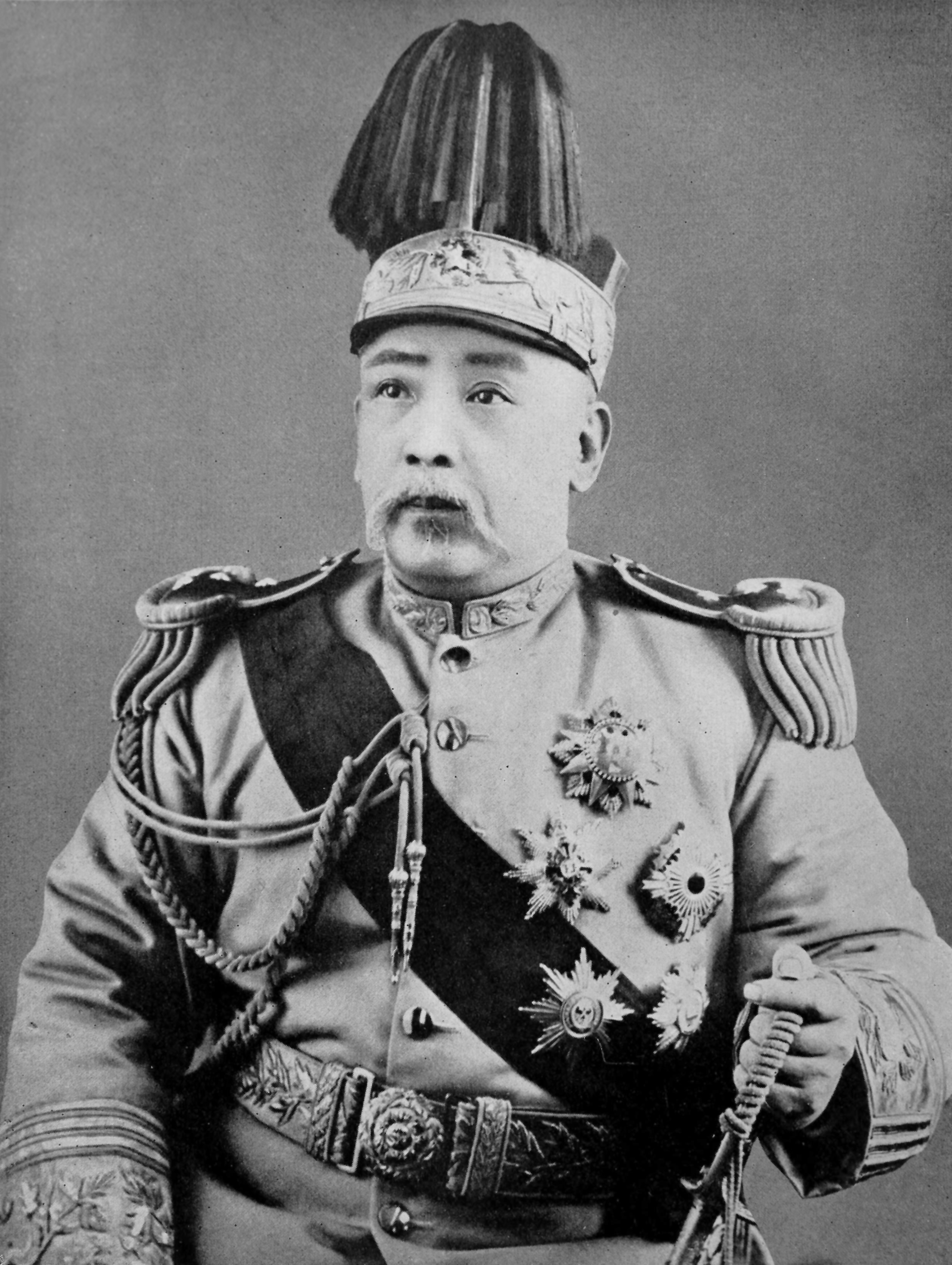
Yuan Shikai

By the early 20th century, mass civil disorder had begun in China, and it was growing continuously. To overcome such problems, Empress Dowager Cixi issued an imperial edict in 1901 calling for reform proposals from the governors-general and governors and initiated the era of the dynasty's "New Policies", also known as the "Late Qing reforms". The edict paved the way for the most far-reaching reforms in terms of their social consequences, including the creation of a national education system and the abolition of the imperial examinations in 1905.

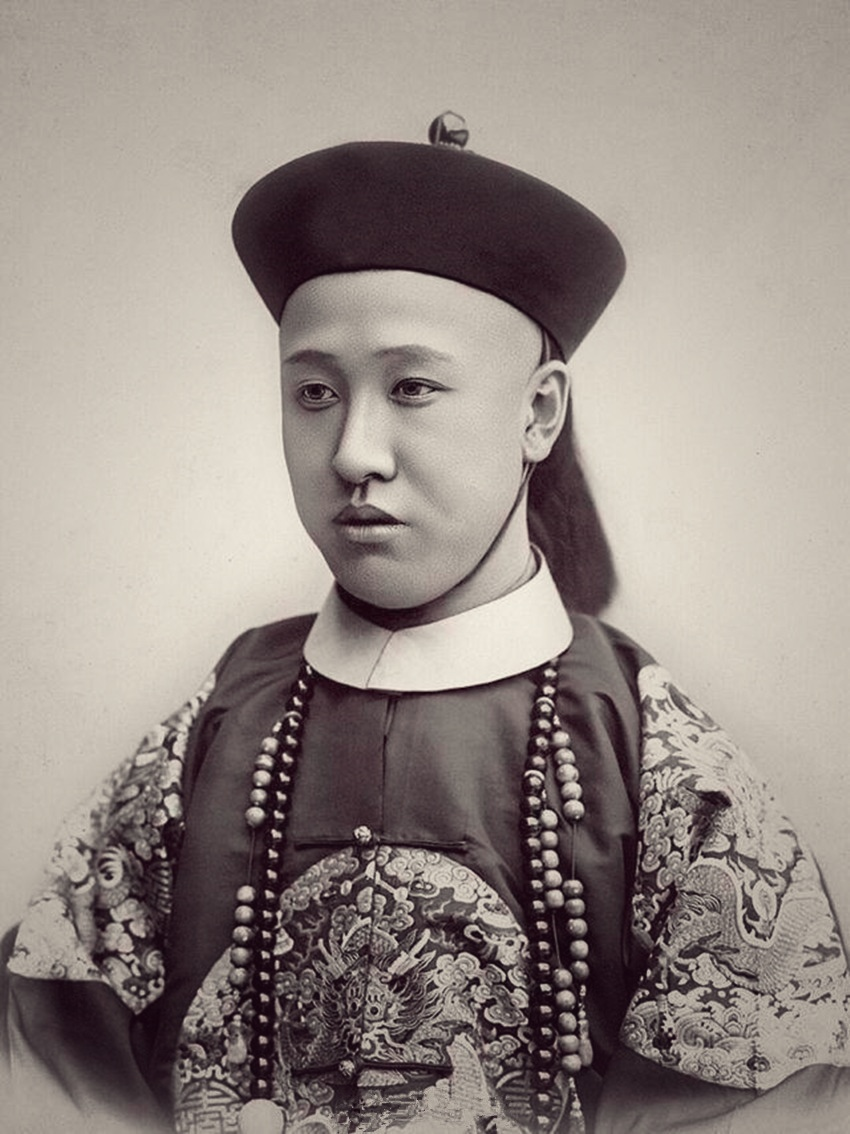
Zaifeng, Prince Chun

The Guangxu Emperor died on 14 November 1908, and on 15 November 1908, Cixi also died. Rumors held that she or Yuan Shikai ordered trusted eunuchs to poison the Guangxu Emperor, and an autopsy conducted nearly a century later confirmed lethal levels of arsenic in his corpse. Puyi, the oldest son of Zaifeng, Prince Chun, and nephew to the childless Guangxu Emperor, was appointed successor at the age of two, leaving Zaifeng with the regency. This was followed by the dismissal of General Yuan Shikai from his former positions of power. In April 1911 Zaifeng created a cabinet in which there were two vice-premiers. Nonetheless, this cabinet was also known by contemporaries as the "Royal Cabinet" because among the thirteen cabinet members, five were members of the imperial family or Aisin Gioro relatives. This brought a wide range of negative opinions from constitutionalists and some senior officials. The Wuchang Uprising of 10 October 1911 was a success; by November, 14 of the 22 provinces had rejected Qing rule. This led to the creation of a new central government, the Republic of China, in Nanjing with Sun Yat-sen as its provisional head. Many provinces soon began "separating" from Qing control. Seeing a desperate situation unfold, the Qing government brought Yuan Shikai back to military power. He took control of his Beiyang Army to crush the revolution in Wuhan at the Battle of Yangxia. After taking the position of Prime Minister and creating his own cabinet, Yuan Shikai went as far as to ask for the removal of Zaifeng from the regency. This removal later proceeded with directions from Empress Dowager Longyu. Yuan Shikai was now the ruler of China, and the Manchu dynasty had lost all power; it formally abdicated in early 1912.

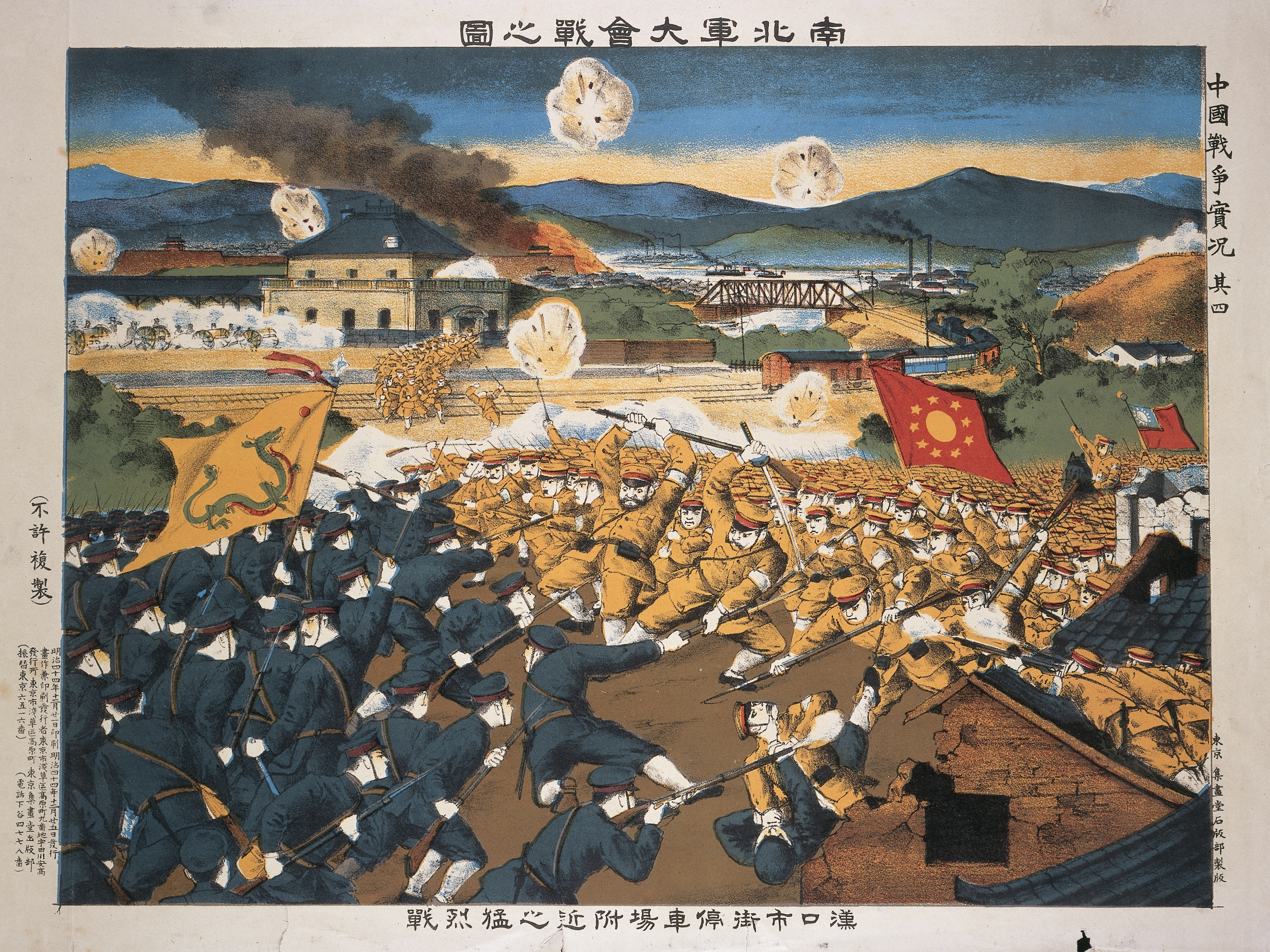
A pitched battle between the imperial and revolutionary armies in 1911

Premier Yuan Shikai and his Beiyang commanders decided that going to war would be unreasonable and costly. Similarly, Sun Yat-sen wanted a republican constitutional reform, for the benefit of China's economy and populace. With permission from Empress Dowager Longyu, Yuan Shikai began negotiating with Sun Yat-sen, who decided that his goal had been achieved in forming a republic, and that therefore he could allow Yuan to step into the position of President of the Republic of China.

On 12 February 1912, after rounds of negotiations, Longyu issued an imperial edict bringing about the abdication of the child emperor Puyi. This brought an end to over 2,000 years of Imperial China and began an extended period of instability of warlord factionalism. The unorganized political and economic systems combined with a widespread criticism of Chinese culture led to questioning and doubt about the future. Some Qing loyalists organized themselves as "Royalist Party", and tried to use militant activism and open rebellions to restore the monarchy, but to no avail. In July 1917, there was an abortive attempt to restore the Qing dynasty led by Zhang Xun, which was quickly reversed by republican troops. Puyi was allowed to live in the Forbidden city after his abdication until the Beijing Coup happened in 1924. In the 1930s, the Empire of Japan invaded Northeast China and founded Manchukuo in 1932, with Puyi as its emperor. After the invasion by the Soviet Union, Manchukuo fell in 1945.

== See also ==
- Government of the Qing dynasty
- Legacy of the Qing dynasty
