= Zheltuga Republic =

1883–6 proto-state in Heilongjiang, China, set up by Chinese and Russian gold miners

Zheltuga Republic 熱爾圖加共和國 (Chinese) Rè'ěrtújiā Gònghéguó Желтугинская Республика (Russian) Zheltuginskaya Respublika
- 1883–1886
- Flag

- Status: Unrecognized proto-state
- President
  - 1883–1885: Karl Fassi
- History
  - Established: 1883
  - Disestablished: 1886
Preceded by	Succeeded by
Qing dynasty	Qing dynasty

Location of Zheltuga within Heilongjiang province, China

The Zheltuga Republic (Chinese: 熱爾圖加共和國; pinyin: Rè'ěrtújiā Gònghéguó; Russian: Желтугинская республика, Zheltuginskaya Respublika), or simply Zheltuga (Russian: Желтуга), was a short-lived 19th-century proto-state in the Amur river basin set up by Russian and Chinese gold miners illegally settling on Chinese territory ruled by the Qing dynasty. It was nicknamed "California on the Amur" (referencing the California Gold Rush). Its population reached 12,000 prospectors at its peak. (Note: Sources differ – may have been up to 20,000.) However, the proto-state was crushed by the Qing forces by 1886.

== Founding ==
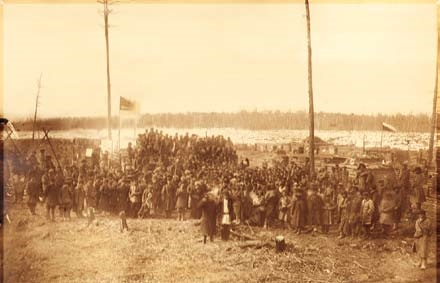
Gathering of Zheltuga miners. The black-and-yellow flag of the republic can be seen on the right.

In 1883, gold was discovered along the Albazikha river (also known as the Emur), a tributary of the Shilka, itself a tributary of the Amur, leading to Chinese and Russian prospectors flocking to the area and creating a settlement on the right bank of the Amur itself across from Ignashino. The settlement was nicknamed Ignashinskaia Kaliforniia (due to its proximity to Ignashino). It is suggested that the settlement was named Zheltuga after the Zhelta river, a tributary of Albazikha.

As early as 1884, Russian and Chinese prospectors went up the Amur from Blagoveshchensk to Ignashino and then illegally crossed the river to the Chinese side. In winter, the journey was made by foot. Most of the Chinese settlers were coolies hailing from Shandong province in China. There were also Manchu settlers, who mainly hailed from Aigun. The settlement was also a hotbed for criminals, with escaped convicts from Nerchinsk penal labor colonies and Sakhalin being blamed for violence in the settlement. Also notable for settling at Zheltuga were deserters from other private gold mines on the Amur, as well as Old Believers from Transbaikal. Women were not allowed (aside from the family members of a few miners, who were allowed to settle in 1885), and so a sex industry developed across the river from Zheltuga. The "International California" comprised, according to one source, "Koreans, Orochons, Jews, Germans, French, Poles, Americans, Siberians, and many various adventurers who mostly arrived from America and became the leaders of the masses". Visiting French travelers claimed that the Republic was inhabited by Honghuzi, although this claim was not found elsewhere. However, it is plausible that the Qing government referred to them as Honghuzi due to the Republic's illegal nature.

== Growing community ==
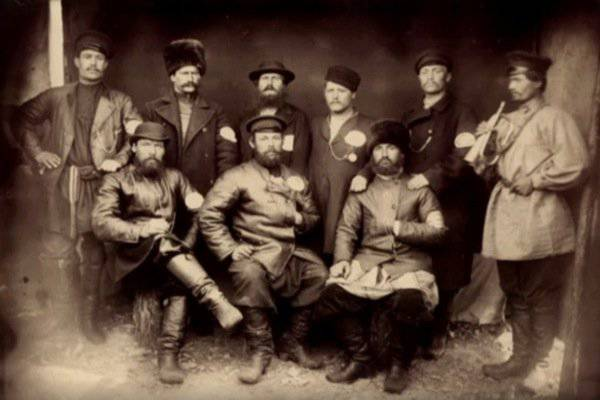
9 of the 10 headmen of Zheltuga

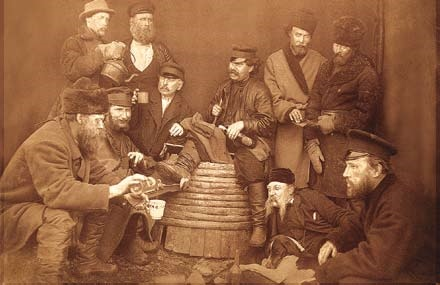
Headmen of the Zheltuga Republic

As Zheltuga swelled in size, so did its needs. In spring 1885, a visiting journalist counted eighteen hotels and multiple entertainment services such as a billiards saloon and a photography atelier. Merchants (among them Old Believers and Jews) supplied alcohol to the settlement while transporting its gold at the same time. Businesses within the settlement paid tax to a common treasury, the funds of which were used to maintain the local church, the public bathhouse, and the hospital, as well as to pay high-ranking executives.

At first, Zheltuga was a hotbed of violence and reckless activity. Miners would dig random pits in the hopes of finding gold, destroying any hope of using the land mined for further exploitation. The looming danger of a Chinese attack meant that the miners were constantly in a rush and wanted to find as much gold as possible. However, it became obvious that the Chinese would not attack Zheltuga as they simply did not know of its existence.

Important decisions within the community were undertaken by miners' meetings called Orlinoe poe at the central field of Orlovo pole (Eagle Field). The main street within the settlement was named Millionaia street. There were ten leaders important in Zheltuga at any given time, elected from their own districts. Zheltuga had five districts (four Russian, one Chinese), each represented by two foremen. Once it was established that the settlement was relatively safe from Chinese attack, the leaders of Zheltuga decided to bring order to the community. A black-and-yellow flag was created, symbolizing the land and the gold. The miners established a law between them, written down in a "statute" of twenty clauses, mainly focused on the distribution of punishment. A court of law as well as a law enforcement agency was set up, responsible for harshly enforcing order within the settlement. These laws were heavily enforced from their promulgation to the creation of a semblance of order within the settlement. The leaders of Zheltuga came and went quickly, reflecting the state of the community as one in constant flux. During this time, the community was led by a man referred to as "Adolf Karlovich Fass", a secretive man who was arrested in March 1885 in Ignashino and identified as an Italian by the name of Karl Fassi. (Note: May also have been the Austro-Hungarian subject Karl Johann Fasse, the Slovak (at the time, also a part of Austria-Hungary) Karl Karlovich Ivanovich, Karl Karlovich Fosse of Trieste, Adolf Karlovich Fass of Bohemia, or the Rusyn Karl Karlovich Ivanko.) Following Fassi, leadership may have been taken over from him by a telegrapher by the name of Sakharov. One of the last leaders of Zheltuga was a lawyer by the name of Pavel P. Prokunin, who was related to the House of Golitsyn. After having been deposed by the miners, Prokunin gave his account of Zheltuga to a local historian in Blagoveshchensk. The President of the Republic received 400 rubles a month, (Note: Sources differ – some say that the President received 1,000 rubles per month.) while the ten foremen received 200 rubles.

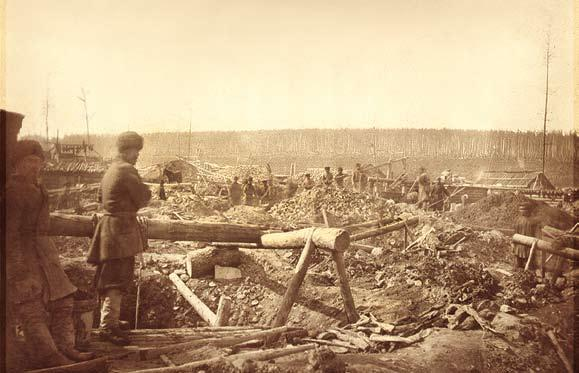
Zheltuga miners at work

Punishment within Zheltuga was strict – some punishments would be doled out with a ternovnik, or spiked whip, which meant almost certain death. Thieves received 500 ternovnik whips, homosexuals, other criminals accused of "unnatural vices and crimes", people carrying weapons while drunk, people who made false gold sand, and people who shot guns within the limits of the Republic without a good cause received 500 normal whips, people who brought women into Zheltuga without express permission were hit 400 times with a stick, people who offered up their work tools as a pledge received 300 blows with a stick, and people who made loud noises at night were dealt 200 blows with a stick.

== Peak ==
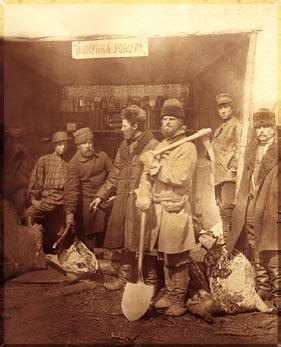
Miners in the Zheltuga Republic

The growth of a multiethnic community in Zheltuga led to needs to communicate effectively. As so, the Kyakhta pidgin language (a combination of Russian and Chinese) was likely spoken in the settlement. Russian, however, was the official language, owing to the population mainly consisting of Russians. Inhabitants of Zheltuga also likely used different signs and notches to communicate with each other when there was a language barrier, a practice common in the general region.

The population of Zheltuga was divided occupationally into several categories. The majority of the population were categorized into priiskateli (standard miners) and khishchniki / khitniki ("predators"). The second major category were the spiritonosy (alcohol carriers), who sold vodka to the miners. Due to constant fighting among drunk miners, drinking was banned within 50 versts from a pit (reduced to 25 versts later on). The common punishment for open drunkenness was one hundred lashes with a whip, and traders were generally not allowed to sell alcohol, leading to the use of underhanded tactics – some spiritonosy would buy land near a mine and disguise their workers as miners who would secretly trade diluted vodka for gold. The third main category were the torgovtsy (merchants). Merchants were further divided into temporary and permanent merchants, the latter of which numbered 300 during the heyday of the Zheltuga Republic. Most torgovtsy were Molokans or Jews, supplied mostly by the Dickson & Co. Trading House. The people of Zheltuga also traded with Cossacks during the earlier days of the settlement.

Zheltuga grew so fast that within a few years of its founding, the settlement had a theater, two orchestras, a menagerie, and a full troupe of circus performers. The Casino Chita, nicknamed "Monte Carlo" by locals, was also founded, and at its height, miners would lose up to 4,000 rubles at a table. Across the settlement, high-quality hotels sprung up, with names like "New China", "Russia", "Marseille", and "California", reportedly not at all inferior to European ones. The local hospital, run by funds raised from taxes, was free, providing three free meals a day for patients. Most of the patients who were hospitalized suffered from typhus and scurvy.

== Fall ==
Throughout most of the course of the Zheltuga Republic's life, the officials in China did not know about its existence. The Russians, who knew about Zheltuga and actively cooperated with it, refused to acknowledge its existence. When word got to the governor of Aigun of the existence of the Republic, the governor repeatedly petitioned Baron A.N. Korff of Priamur to expel the miners, but was ignored. Later on, Empress Dowager Cixi personally sent a letter to the Russian Tsar, Alexander III, in protest. The Russians sent Cossacks to Zheltuga to warn the settlers of a Chinese attack as well as block passage from the Russian to the Chinese side of the Amur.

Throughout 1885, Chinese forces started to become active around the area of Zheltuga. In July 1885, the Russian government officially called for the return of all Russian subjects to Russian territory. On August 18, 1885, a Qing official, along with 60 soldiers, visited the settlement to demand evacuation within eight days. The Chinese returned after the deadline passed and found Zheltuga mostly empty. The settlers, however, had simply hidden away nearby, and began to return. In January 1886, the Chinese again sent a detachment to the Republic of 1,600 soldiers ordered to raze the colony, deport the Russians, and execute any Chinese. The decision to allow the Russian settlers free passage home was to ensure that a worsening of relations with Russia would not occur. The settlement dispersed as a result, and Zheltuga was burned to the ground. The Russian survivors, most of whom moved to different parts of the country, attempted to replicate Zheltuga, but failed. The Chinese survivors who fled to the left bank of the Amur successfully started to mine gold at other sites in the Amur river basin, albeit with less success. The city of Mohe was founded nearby, with an official gold mine opened there the year after. "Transnational endeavors" of Chinese miners in Russian territory similar to those of the Zheltuga miners sprung up in the years following the fall of the Zheltuga Republic.
