= Ignashino =

Ignashino Игнашино
- Selo
- Location within Amur Oblast Location within Russia
- Coordinates: 53°27′N 122°24′E
- Country: Russia
- Region: Amur Oblast
- District: Skovorodinsky District
- Time zone: UTC+9:00

Ignashino (Russian: Игнашино) is a rural locality (a selo) in Rabochy Posyolok Erofey Pavlovich of Skovorodinsky District, Amur Oblast, Russia. The population was 179 as of 2018. There are 7 streets.

== Geography ==
Ignashino is located 230 km southwest of Skovorodino (the district's administrative centre) by road. Yerofey Pavlovich is the nearest rural locality. Ignashino lies directly to the Chinese border.
