= Chinese nationalism =

- Traditional Chinese: 中國民族主義
- Simplified Chinese: 中国民族主义
Transcriptions
Standard Mandarin
- Hanyu Pinyin: Zhōngguó mínzú zhǔyì
- Bopomofo: ㄓㄨㄥ ㄍㄨㄛˊ ㄇㄧㄣˊ ㄗㄨˊ ㄓㄨˇ ㄧˋ
- Wade–Giles: Chung^{1}-kuo^{2} min^{2}-tsu^{2} chu^{3}-i^{4}

Alternative Chinese name
- Traditional Chinese: 中華民族主義
- Simplified Chinese: 中华民族主义
Transcriptions
Standard Mandarin
- Hanyu Pinyin: Zhōnghuá mínzú zhǔyì
- Bopomofo: ㄓㄨㄥ ㄏㄨㄚˊ ㄇㄧㄣˊ ㄗㄨˊ ㄓㄨˇ ㄧˋ
- Wade–Giles: Chung^{1}-hua^{2} min^{2}-tsu^{2} chu^{3}-i^{4}

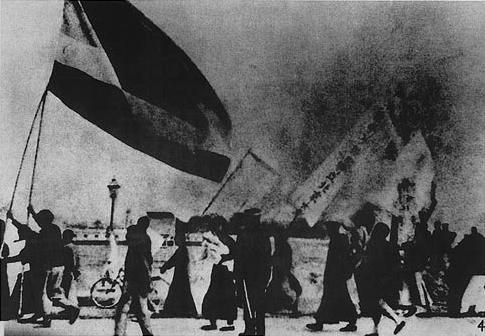
At the beginning of the 20th century, the sentiment of nationalism in China rose sharply, represented by the May Fourth Movement in 1919

Chinese nationalism (Note: There are various translations for "Nationalism" in Chinese: 民族主义; 民族主義 (mínzú zhǔyì); 国族主义; 國族主義 (guózú zhǔyì); 国民主义; 國民主義 (guómín zhǔyì); 国粹主义; 國粹主義 (guócuì zhǔyì)) is a form of nationalism that asserts that the Chinese people are a nation and promotes the cultural and national unity of all Chinese people. According to Sun Yat-sen's philosophy in the Three Principles of the People, Chinese nationalism is considered a multi-ethnic nationalism, which some distinguish from Han nationalism or "local ethnic nationalism." (Note: Chinese nationalism emphasizes the concept of Zhonghua minzu and does not fit into the binary of "civic nationalism" and "ethnic nationalism".)

Modern Chinese nationalism emerged in the late Qing dynasty (1644–1912) in response to China's humiliating defeat at the end of the First Sino-Japanese War and the invasion and pillaging of Beijing by the Eight-Nation Alliance. In the aftermath of both events, China was forced to pay financial reparations and grant special privileges to foreigners. The nationwide image of China as a superior Celestial Empire, which was located at the center of the universe, was shattered, and last-minute efforts to modernize the old system were unsuccessful. These last-minute efforts were best exemplified by Liang Qichao, a late Qing reformer who failed to reform the Qing government in 1896 and was later expelled from China and fled to Japan, where he began to develop his ideas of Chinese nationalism.

The effects of World War I continually shaped Chinese nationalism. Despite the fact that it had joined the Allied Powers, China was again severely humiliated by the Versailles Treaty of 1919, which transferred the special privileges which were given to Germany to the Empire of Japan. This event triggered the May Fourth Movement of 1919, which developed into nationwide protests that were marked by a surge of Chinese nationalism. During the Warlord Era, large-scale military campaigns which were led by the Kuomintang (KMT), overpowered provincial warlords and sharply reduced special privileges for foreigners contributed to the strengthening and aggrandizing of a sense of Chinese national identity.

The current national flag of the People's Republic of China (1949–present), representing a variety of Chinese nationalism. Currently in use in mainland China, Hong Kong and Macau. Closely associated with the Chinese Communist Party (CCP)

The second national flag of the Republic of China (1928–present), representing a variety of Chinese nationalism. Defunct on mainland China post-1949. Currently in use in the Taiwan Area of the Republic of China. Closely associated with the Kuomintang (KMT), also known as the Chinese Nationalist Party

After the Empire of Japan was defeated by the Allies at the end of World War II, Chinese nationalism again gained traction as China recovered territories which it lost to Japan before the war, including Northeast area and the island of Taiwan. However, the Chinese Civil War (which was paused during the Second Sino-Japanese War) was resumed, damaging the image of a unified Chinese identity. The Chinese Communist Party (CCP) was victorious in 1949, as the KMT's government retreated to Taiwan. Under CCP chairman Mao Zedong, the CCP began to employ Chinese nationalism as a political tool. Chinese nationalism has become more Han-centric since Xi Jinping became CCP general secretary and assumed power in 2012.

== Historical development ==
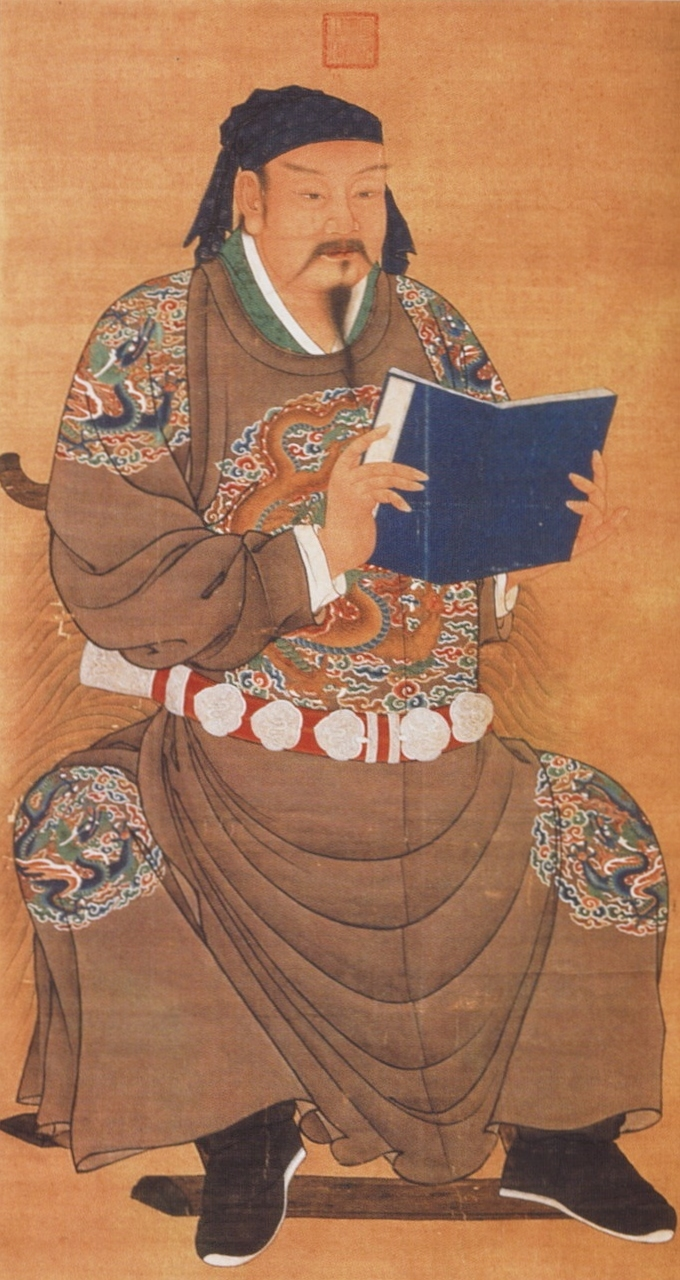
Qing dynasty illustration of Yue Fei who led Chinese Southern Song army against Jurchens

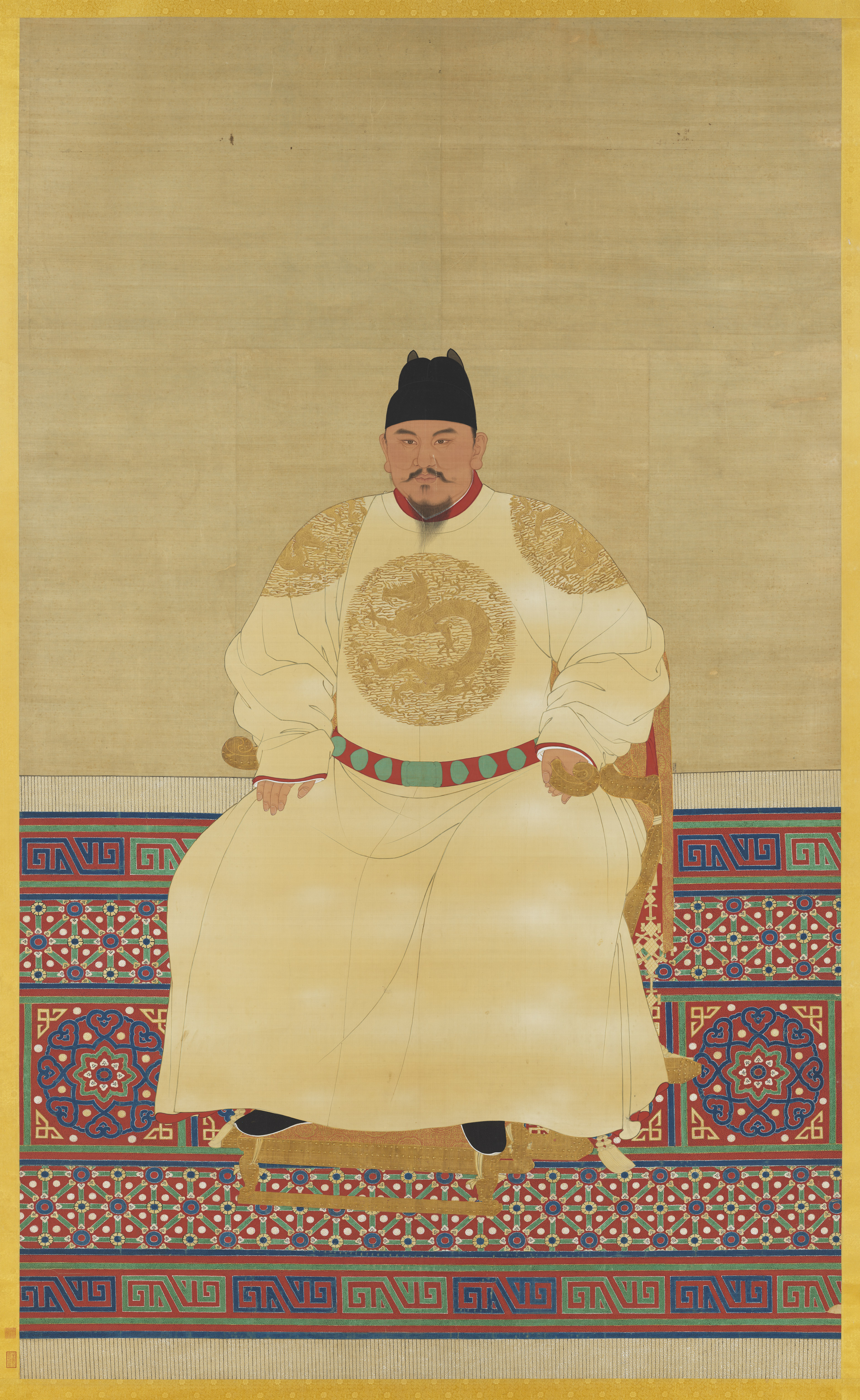
Portrait of the Hongwu Emperor, who led Chinese movement against Mongol Yuan dynasty

The first state of China was confirmed as the Shang dynasty (c. 1570 – c. 1045 BC). The Chinese concept of the world was largely a division between the civilized world and the barbarian world and there was little concept of the belief that Chinese interests were served by a powerful Chinese state. Commenter Lucian Pye has argued that the modern "nation state" is fundamentally different from a traditional empire, and argues that dynamics of the current People's Republic of China (PRC) – a concentration of power at a central point of authority – share an essential similarity with the Ming and Qing Empires.

As it emerged in the early 20th century, Chinese nationalism was modeled after Japanese nationalism, especially as it was viewed and interpreted by Sun Yat-sen. In 1894, Sun founded the Revive China Society, which was the first Chinese nationalist revolutionary society.

Chinese nationalism was rooted in the long historic tradition in which China was considered the center of the world, in which all other states were offshoots of China and owed some sort of deference to it. That sense of superiority underwent a series of terrible shocks in the 19th century, including large-scale internal revolts, and more grievously the systematic gaining and removal of special rights and privileges by foreign nations which proved their military superiority during the First and Second Opium Wars, based on modern technology that was lacking in China. It was a matter of humiliation one after another, the loss of faith in the Qing dynasty. By the 1890s, disaffected Chinese intellectuals began to develop "a new nationalist commitment to China as a nation-state in a world dominated by predatory imperialist nation states." Overall, their concern was not in preserving a traditional Chinese order but instead the construction of a strong state and society that could stand in a hostile international arena.

Unlike many nationalist projects in other countries, the trend among Chinese intellectuals was to regard tradition as unsuitable for China's survival and instead to view tradition as a source of China's problems. For the Qing dynasty, ethnicity was a troublesome issue. Some of the ethnic groups within the empire were identified according to language and culture, including the Manchus who originated in a non-Han Chinese population and ruled the dynasty. Most citizens had multiple identities, of which the locality was more important than the nation as a whole. Anyone who wanted to rise in government non-military service had to be immersed in Confucian classics, and pass the imperial examination. If accepted, they would be rotated around the country, so the bureaucrats did not identify with the locality. The depth of two-way understanding and trust developed by European political leaders and their followers did not exist.

China's defeat by Japan at the end of the First Sino-Japanese War (1894–1895) was fundamental to the development of the first generation of Chinese nationalists. The most dramatic watershed came in 1900, in the wake of the invasion, capture, and pillaging of the national capital by the Eight-Nation Alliance that punished China for the Boxer Rebellion. During the Late Qing reforms, the rise of the national education trend emphasizes instilling national values in education and inspiring patriotic sentiments. For example, the Chinese geography textbooks published during the period usually praised China's superior geographical conditions, and such texts generally came from the first chapters of the textbooks, which were convenient for guiding students to develop a love for their motherland when they first came into contact with China's geography. Chinese nationalists drew inspiration from Japan's victory in the Russo-Japanese War, which they broadly viewed as demonstrating the fallacy of a European-centric racial hierarchy.

The Second Sino-Japanese war was one of the most important events in the modern construction of Chinese nationalism. The Chinese experience in the war helped create an ideology based on the concept of "the people" as a political body in its own right, "a modern nation as opposed to a feudal empire."

Not only was this ideology perpetuated by the Second Sino-Japanese War, but it also later served as a tool to rebuild legitimacy for the Chinese Communist Party (CCP). Although the CCP initially gained support through nationalist resistance, its legitimacy declined after setbacks like the Great Leap Forward and the Cultural Revolution, which caused economic hardship and social unrest. To recover, the CCP increasingly relied on nationalism to shift the focus to national pride and unity. They accomplished this by implementing "patriotic education" campaigns, promoting a victimization narrative, and revising textbooks to emphasize conflicts with Japan and the West. These initiatives reframed the CCP as the "savior" of the nation, helping restore public support and reinforcing its political legitimacy.

== Ideological sources ==
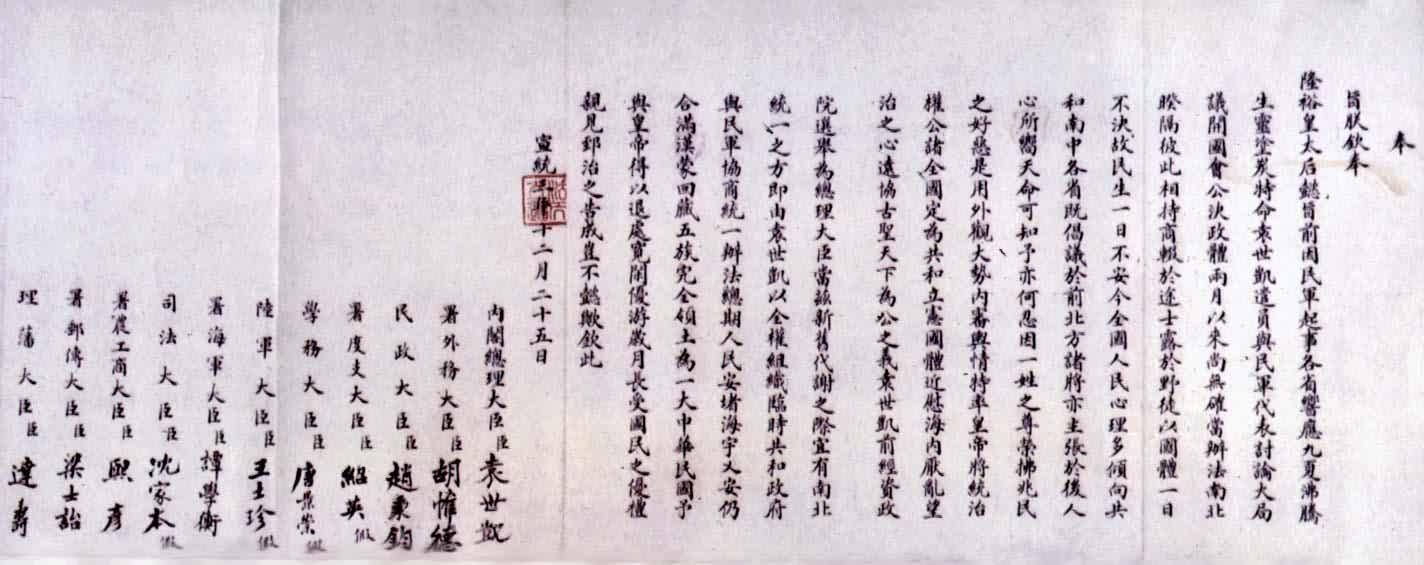
This abdication decree announced the fall of the Qing Dynasty and the succession of the Republic of China, marking the success of the 1911 Revolution

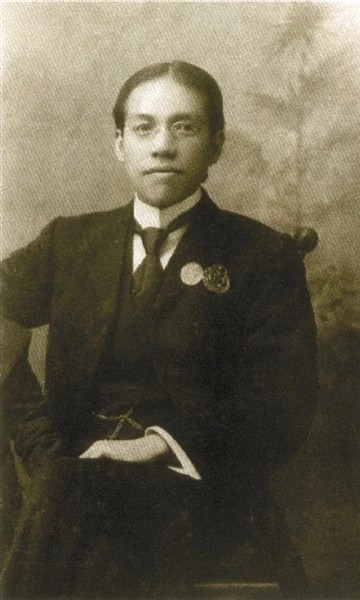
Liang Qichao, who greatly contributed to creating the foundation of modern Chinese nationalism

The discussion about modern Chinese nationalism has dominated many political and intellectual debates since the late nineteenth century. Political scientist Suisheng Zhao argues that nationalism in China is not monolithic because it exists in various forms, including political, liberal, ethnic, and state nationalism.

Chinese nationalism is shaped in part by the Western-derived Westphalian system. During the first half of the twentieth century, Chinese nationalism constituted a crucial part of many political ideologies, including anti-Manchuism, which was espoused during the 1911 Revolution, the anti-imperialist sentiment of the May Fourth Movement in 1919, and the Maoist thoughts that guided the Chinese Communist Revolution. The origin of modern Chinese nationalism can be traced back to the intellectual debate about the subjects of race and nation which occurred during the late nineteenth century. Shaped by the global discourse about Social Darwinism, reformers and intellectuals both held debates about how they should build a new Chinese national subject based on a proper racial order, particularly on Manchu-Han relations. After the collapse of the Qing regime and the founding of the Republic of China in 1912, concerns about domestic and international threats caused the role of racism to decline and during the 1910s, anti-imperialism became the new dominant ideology of Chinese nationalism. While intellectuals and elites advocated their distinctive thoughts about Chinese nationalism, political scientist Chalmers Johnson has pointed out that most of these ideas had very little to do with China's majority population—the Chinese peasantry. Thus, he proposes to supplement the ideology of the Chinese Communist Party in the discussion of Chinese nationalism, which he labels "peasant nationalism."

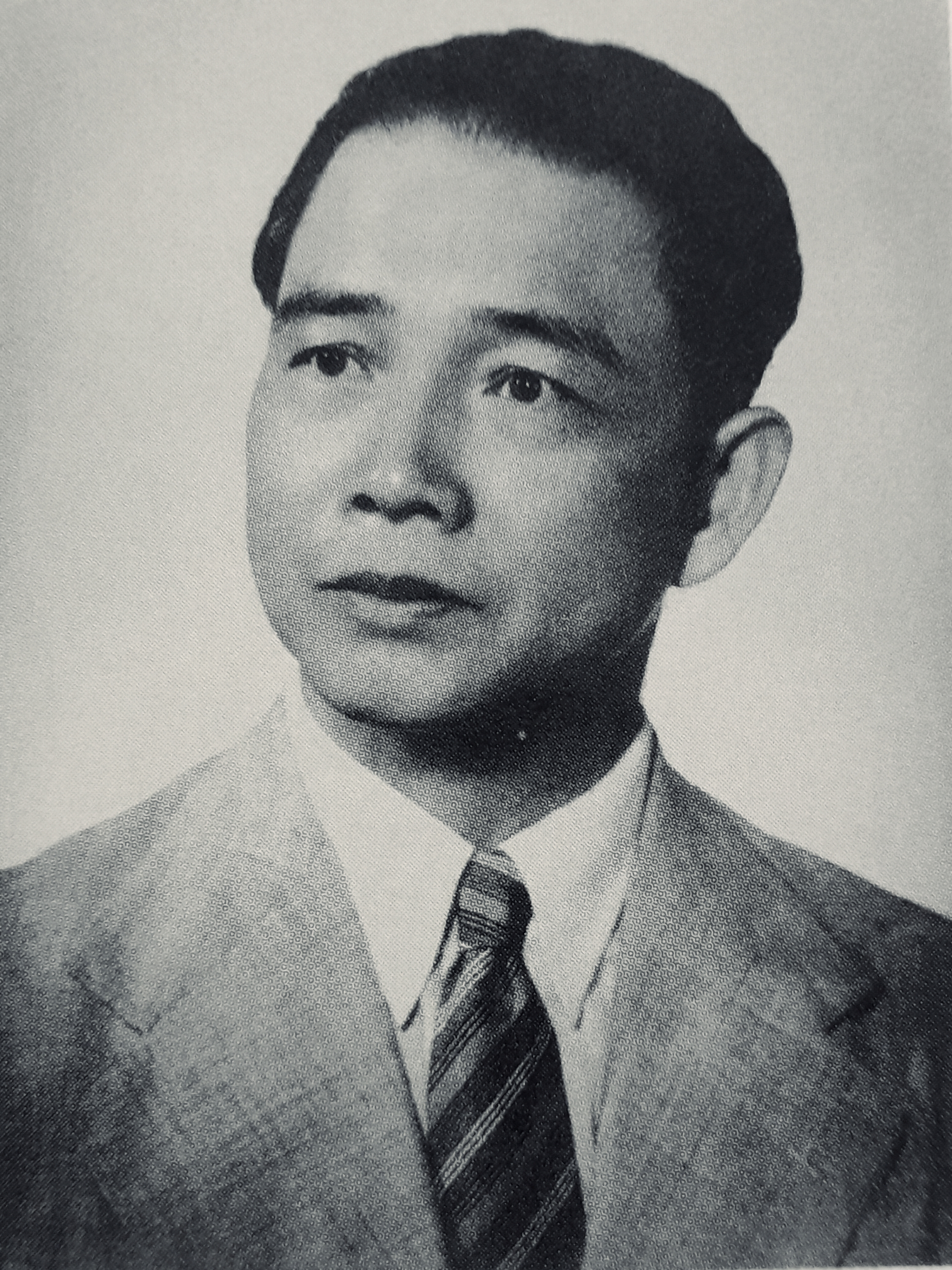
Wang Jingwei

In some revolutionary circles in the 19th century, the significance of the development of a Chinese national identity was the result of an attempt to negatively identify the Han people by turning them against the Qing dynasty, which was non-Chinese in their view. Under this initial view of Chinese nationalism, the Chinese identity was primarily associated with the majority Han ethnic group.

After Qing China's defeat at the end of the Sino-Japanese War of 1895, reformers and intellectuals debated about how to strengthen the nation, the discussion of which centered on the issue of race. Liang Qichao, a late Qing reformist who participated in the Hundred Days' Reform of 1898, contended that the boundary between Han and Manchu must be erased (ping Man-Han zhi jie). Liang was among the most prominent nationalists who viewed earlier conceptions of a Han-focused national identity as too restrictive. Liang attributed the decline of China to the Qing dynasty which was founded by the Manchus, who treated the Han as an "alien race" and imposed a racial hierarchy between the Han and the Manchus and ignored the threats which were posed by imperial powers. However Liang's critique of the Qing court and the Manchu-Han relations laid the foundation for anti-Manchuism, an ideology that early Republican and nationalist revolutionaries advocated in accordance with their efforts to overthrow the Qing dynasty and found a new Republic in China. More broadly, Liang's view was that modernity was "an age of struggle among nations for the survival of the fittest" and that therefore the Qing government should support industrialization and develop a Chinese people with strong work ethic, "a strong sense of nationalism, and a militaristic mentality."

In his writing "Revolutionary Army," Zou Rong, an active Chinese revolutionary at the turn of the twentieth century, demanded an educational revolution for the Han people who were suffering under the oppressive rule of the Manchus. He argued that China should be a nation of the orthodox Han Chinese and no alien race shall rule over them. According to Zou, the Han Chinese, as the descendants of the Yellow Emperor, must overthrow the Manchu rule to restore their legitimacy and rights. Wang Jingwei, a Chinese revolutionary who later became an important figure in the Kuomintang, also believed that the Manchus were an inferior race. Wang contended that a state consisting of a single race would be superior to those multiracial ones. Most of the Republican revolutionaries agreed that preserving the race was vital to the survival of the nation. Since the Han had asserted its dominant role in Chinese nationalism, the Manchus had to be either absorbed or eradicated. Historian Prasenjit Duara summarized this by stating that the Republican revolutionaries primarily drew on the international discourse of "racist evolutionism" to envision a "racially purified China."

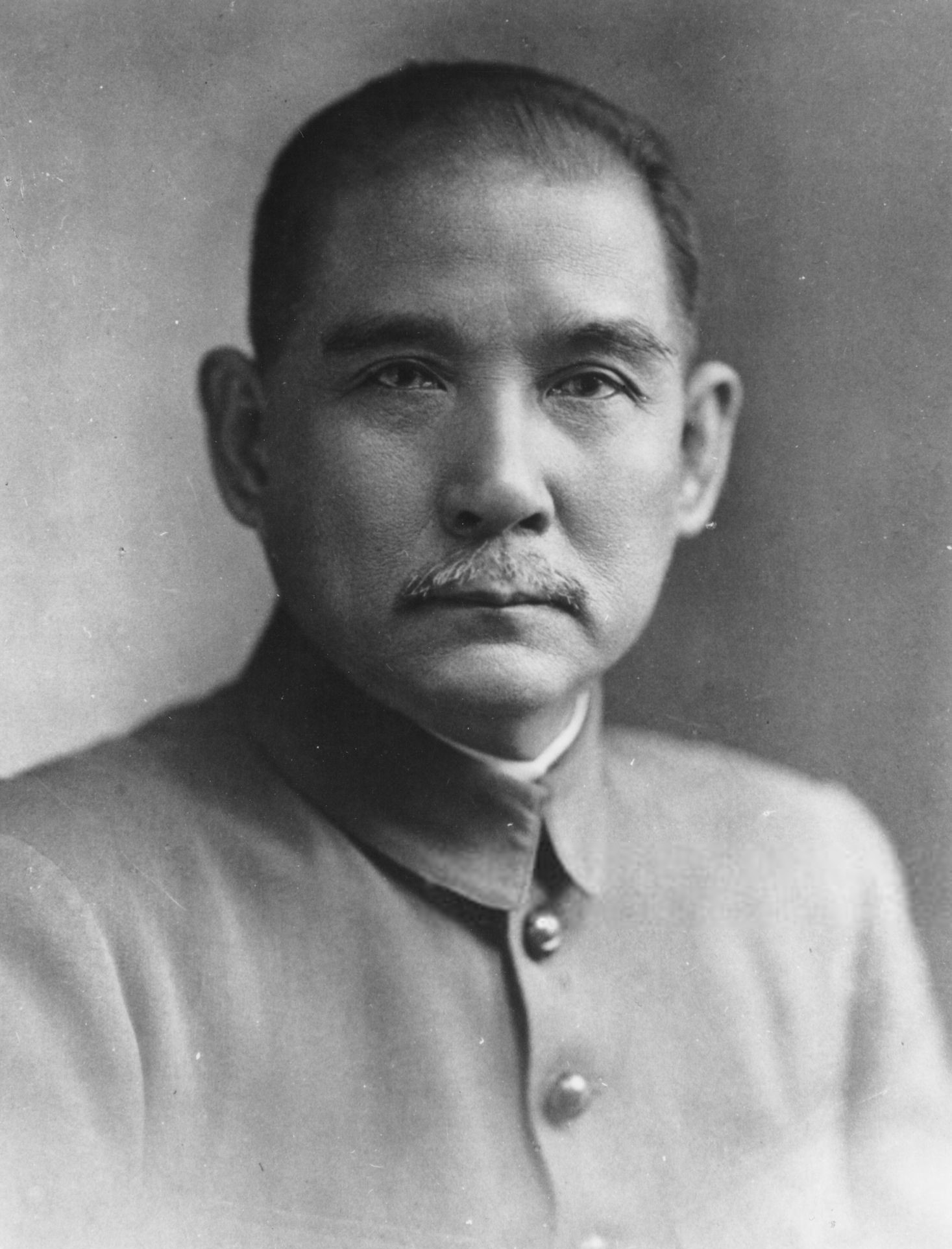
Sun Yat-sen, founder of the Kuomintang

After the 1911 Revolution, Sun Yat-sen established the Republic of China, the national flag of which contained five colors with each symbolizing a major racial ethnicity of China. This marked a shift from the earlier discourse about radical racism and the assimilation of the non-Han groups to a discourse about the political autonomy of the five races. The rhetorical move, as China historian Joseph Esherick points out, was based on practical concerns about imperial threats from the international environment and conflicts on the Chinese frontiers. While both Japan and Russia were encroaching China, the newly born republic also faced ethnic movements in Mongolia and Tibet which claimed themselves to be part of the Qing Empire rather than the Republic of China. Pressured by both domestic and international problems, the fragile Republican regime decided to maintain the borders of the Qing Empire to keep its territories intact. With the increasing threat from the imperialist powers in the 1910s, anti-imperialist sentiments started to grow and spread in China. An ideal of "a morally just universe," anti-imperialism made racism appear shameful and thus took over its dominant role in the conceptualization of Chinese nationalism. Yet racism never perished. Instead, it was embedded by other social realms, including the discourse of eugenics and racial hygiene.

The Treaty of Versailles in 1919 created outrage in China because the allied powers granted German-occupied territory in Shandong to Japan, instead of returning it to China. This increased a populist nationalist sentiment in the May Fourth Movement.

The Blue Shirts Society, a authoritarian nationalist paramilitary organization within the Kuomintang that modelled itself after Mussolini's blackshirts of the National Fascist Party, was anti-foreign and anti-communist, and it stated that its agenda was to expel foreign (Japanese and Western) imperialists from China, crush Communism, and eliminate feudalism. In addition to being anticommunist, some KMT members, like Chiang Kai-shek's right-hand man Dai Li were anti-American, and wanted to expel American influence. In addition, the close Sino-German relations at the time promoted close ties between the Nationalist Government and Nazi Germany. The New Life Movement was a government-led civic movement in 1930s China initiated by Chiang Kai-shek to promote cultural reform and Neo-Confucian social morality and to ultimately unite China under a centralized ideology following the emergence of ideological challenges to the status quo. The Movement attempted to counter threats of Western and Japanese imperialism through a resurrection of traditional Chinese morality, which it held to be superior to modern Western values. As such the Movement was based upon Confucianism, mixed with Christianity, nationalism and authoritarianism that have some similarities to fascism. It rejected individualism and liberalism, while also opposing socialism and communism. Some historians regard this movement as imitating Nazism and being a neo-nationalistic movement used to elevate Chiang's control of everyday lives. Frederic Wakeman suggested that the New Life Movement was "Confucian fascism".

In response to the Cultural Revolution, Chiang Kai-shek launched a Chinese Cultural Renaissance movement which followed in the steps of the New Life Movement, the movement promoted Confucian values.

In addition to anti-Manchuism and anti-imperialism, political scientist Chalmers Johnson has argued that the CCP's rise to power through its alliance with the peasantry should also be understood as "a species of nationalism." Johnson observes that social mobilization, a force that unites people to form a political community together, is the "primary tool" for conceptualizing nationalism. In the context of social mobilization, Chinese nationalism fully emerged only during the Second Sino-Japanese War (1937–1945), when the CCP mobilized the peasantry to fight against the Japanese invaders. Johnson contends that early nationalism of the Kuomintang was quite similar to the late nineteenth-century nationalism in Europe, as both referred to the search for their national identities and positions in the modern world by the intelligentsia. He argues that nationalism constructed by the intellectuals is not identical to nationalism based on mass mobilization, as the nationalist movements led by the Kuomintang, as well as the May Fourth Movement in 1919, were not mass movements because their participants were only a small proportion of the society where the peasants were simply absent. When the Second Sino-Japanese War broke out in 1937, the CCP began to mobilize the Chinese peasantry through mass propaganda of national salvation (Chinese: 救國; pinyin: Jiùguó) Johnson observed that the primary shift of the CCP's post-1937 propaganda was its focus on the discourse of national salvation and the temporary retreat of its communist agenda on class struggle and land redistribution. The wartime alliance of the Chinese peasantry and the CCP manifested how the nationalist ideology of the CCP, or the peasant nationalism, reinforced the desire of the Chinese to save and build a strong nation.

A map of the 1945 de jure borders of the Republic of China, used by Chinese nationalists as a map of "Greater China".

Irredentism and expansionism have also played a role in Chinese nationalism, declaring that China should regain its "lost territories" and form a Greater China. To this day, the Republic of China maintains its territorial claims since its inception in 1912. Its territorial claims were inherited from the Great Qing government as part of the Imperial Edict of the Abdication of the Qing Emperor.

In contemporary Chinese intellectual currents, Chinese nationalism is linked to postcolonial and postmodern discourses. In these frameworks, Chinese nationalism is viewed as playing a key role in forming the modern Chinese state and is deemed a progressive force.

== Ethnicity ==
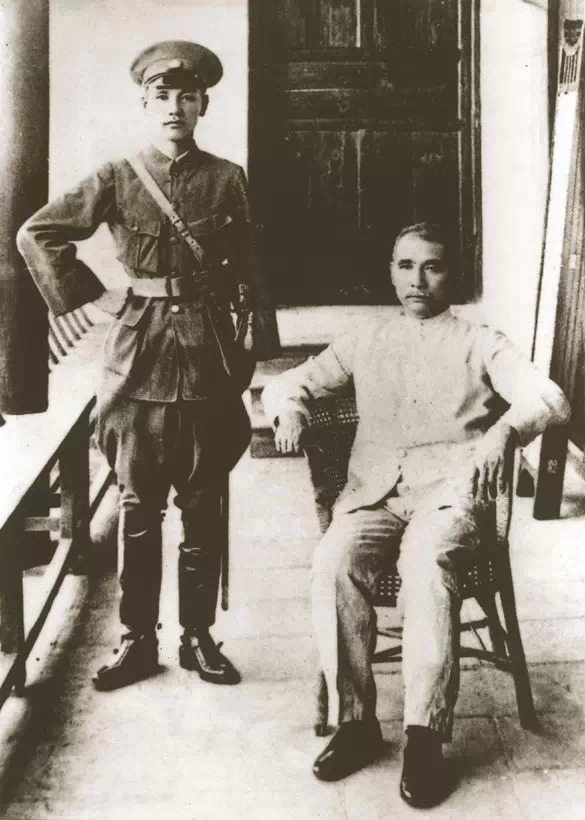
Chinese nationalist leaders Chiang Kai-shek (left) and Sun Yat-sen (right)

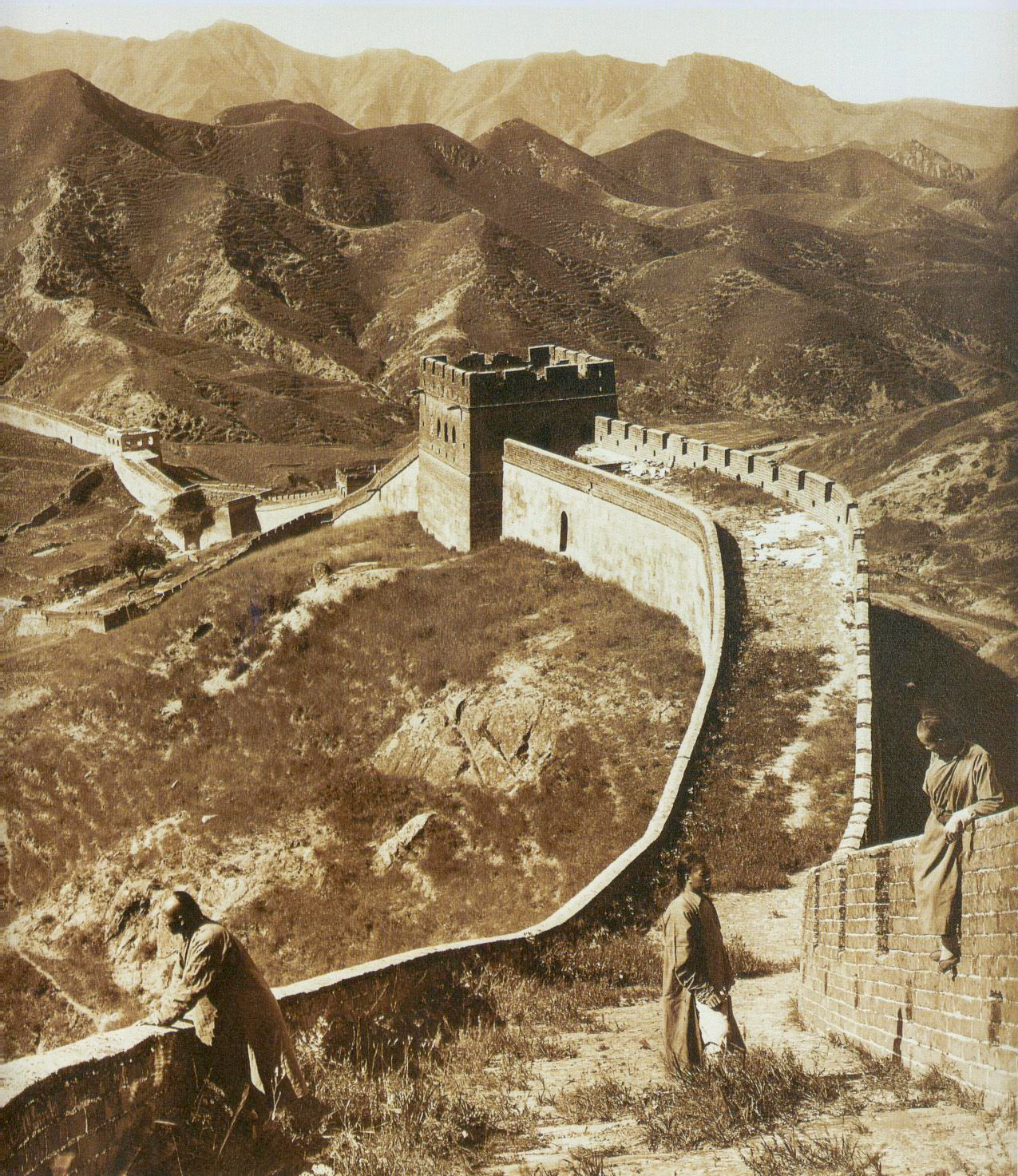
The Great Wall, a national symbol of China

Defining the relationship between ethnicity and the Chinese identity has been a very complex issue throughout Chinese history. In the 17th century, with the help of Ming Chinese rebels, the Manchus conquered China proper and set up the Qing dynasty. Over the next centuries, they would incorporate groups such as the Tibetans, the Mongols, and the Uyghurs into territories which they controlled. The Manchus were faced with the simultaneous task of maintaining loyalty among the people who they ruled and maintaining their distinct identity. The main method by which they accomplished control of the Chinese heartland was by portraying themselves as enlightened Confucian sages part of whose goal was to preserve and advance Chinese civilization. Over the course of centuries, the Manchus were gradually assimilated into Chinese culture and eventually, Manchus identified themselves as a people of China.

The Chinese nation has also been referred to as the descendants of Yan and Yellow Emperors, legendary rulers who are considered the historical ancestors of the Huaxia people, an ethnic group whose members were the ancestors of the Han Chinese.

The complexity of the relationship between ethnicity and Chinese identity was best exemplified during the Taiping Rebellion in which the rebels fiercely fought against the Manchus on the ground that they were barbarians and foreigners while at the same time, others fought just as fiercely on behalf of the Manchus on the ground that they were the preservers of traditional Chinese values.

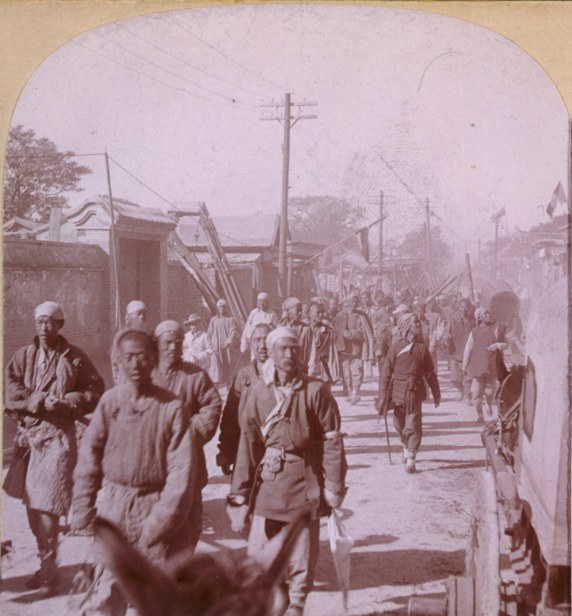
Soldiers of the Yihetuan.

The Yihetuan, also known as the Boxers, were a Chinese nationalist and pro-Qing monarchist secret society which instigated and led the Boxer Rebellion from 1899 to 1901. Their motivations were Anti-Christianism and resistance to Westernisation. At their peak, the Boxers were supported by some members of the Imperial Army. Their slogan was "Support the Qing, destroy the foreigners!".

In 1909, the Law of Nationality of Great Qing (Chinese: 大清國籍條例; pinyin: Dà qīng guójí tiáolì) was published by the Manchu government, which defined Chinese with the following rules: 1) born in China while his/her father is a Chinese; 2) born after his/her father's death while his/her father is a Chinese at his death; 3) his/her mother is a Chinese while his/her father's nationality is unclear or stateless.

In the 1920s and 1930s, the official Chinese nationalistic view was heavily influenced by modernism and Social Darwinism, and it included advocacy of the cultural assimilation of ethnic groups in the western and central provinces into the "culturally advanced" Han state, a policy which would enable them to become members of the Chinese nation in name as well as in fact. Furthermore, it was also influenced by the fate of multi-ethnic states such as Austria-Hungary and the Ottoman Empire. It also became a very powerful force during the Japanese occupation of Coastal China during the 1930s and 1940s and the atrocities committed then.

Influenced by the 1911 Revolution and the appearance of modern nationalist theories, "Zhonghua minzu" in the early Republic of China, referred to the Five Races Under One Union concept. This principle held that the five major ethnicities of China, the Han, Manchus, Mongols, Hui, and Tibetans, all belonged to a single Chinese identity. The government promoted Chinese nationalism for these five ethnic groups, but with the Han Chinese as the main ethnic group of "Zhonghua minzu" or China. This continued with Nationalist rule under Chiang Kai-shek and his Kuomintang in all China until the proclamation of the People's Republic of China in mainland China and the retreat of the Republic of China to Taiwan.

While it was initially rejected by Mao Zedong and his Chinese Communist Party, it was later accepted. The concept of "Chinese" which was developed during Mao's rule was that of a "huge Chinese family", or a political union which includes the Han Chinese and 55 other ethnic groups. Following the establishment of the People's Republic of China, the government extended the number of ethnicities comprising the Chinese nation to these 56.

Before Xi Jinping took power in 2012, the People's Republic of China's form of Chinese nationalism was strongly influenced by the Soviet Union's Korenizatsiya policy. The Chinese Communist Party also criticized the Kuomintang-led Republic of China's support of Han chauvinism. The official ideology of the People's Republic of China asserted that China is a multi-ethnic state, where the majority Han constitute one of many ethnic groups of China and each group's culture and language should be respected (akin to Soviet patriotism). The government also instituted policies of affirmative action, in general, and the ethnic policy of the People's Republic of China at the time was strongly influenced by the nature of its Marxist-Leninist state. Despite this official view, assimilationist attitudes remain deeply entrenched, and popular views and actual power relationships create a situation in which Chinese nationalism has in practice meant Han dominance of minority areas and peoples and assimilation of those groups. Since Xi Jinping took power, assimilation of non-Han ethnic groups has been overt and intensified, while preferential policies for ethnic minorities have shrunk.

During the 1960s and 1970s, Chinese nationalism within mainland China became mixed with the rhetoric of Marxism, and as a result, nationalistic rhetoric was largely subsumed into internationalist rhetoric. On the other hand, the primary focus of Chinese nationalism in Taiwan was the preservation of the ideals and lineage of Sun Yat-sen; the party which he founded, the Kuomintang (KMT); and anti-Communism. While the definition of Chinese nationalism differed in the Republic of China (ROC) and the PRC, the KMT and the CCP were both adamant in their claims on Chinese territories such as the Senkaku (Diaoyutai) Islands.

In the 1990s, the dissolution of the Soviet Union, rising economic standards and the lack of any other legitimizing ideology, has led to what most observers see as a resurgence of nationalism within mainland China.

=== Ethnic minorities ===
==== Chinese Muslims and Uyghurs ====
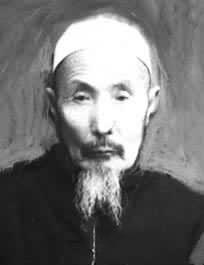
Hu Songshan, a Chinese Muslim Imam who was a Chinese nationalist.

Chinese Muslims have played an important role in Chinese nationalism. Chinese Muslims, known as Hui people, are a mixture of the descendants of foreign Muslims like Arabs and Persians, who mixed with Han Chinese who converted to Islam. Chinese Muslims can speak Chinese and practice Confucianism.

Hu Songshan, a Muslim Imam from Ningxia, was a Chinese nationalist and preached Chinese nationalism and the unity of all Chinese people and against foreign imperialism and other threats to China's sovereignty. He even ordered the Chinese Flag to be saluted during prayer, and that all Imams in Ningxia preach Chinese nationalism. Hu Songshan led the Ikhwan, the Chinese Muslim Brotherhood, which became a Chinese nationalist, patriotic organization, stressing education and independence of the individual. Hu Songhan also wrote a prayer in Arabic and Chinese, praying for Allah to support the Chinese Kuomintang government and defeat Japan. Hu Songshan also cited a Hadith (聖訓), a saying of the prophet Muhammad, which says "Loving the Motherland is equivalent to loving the Faith" (愛護祖國是屬於信仰的一部份). Hu Songshan harshly criticized those who were non-patriotic and those who taught anti-nationalist thinking, saying that they were fake Muslims.

Ma Qixi was a Muslim reformer and a leader of the Xidaotang, and he taught that Islam could be understood only by using Chinese culture such as Confucianism. He read classic Chinese texts and even took his cue from Laozi when he decided to go on Hajj to Mecca.

Ma Fuxiang, a Chinese Muslim general and Kuomintang member, was another Chinese nationalist. Ma Fuxiang preached unity of all Chinese people and even non-Han Chinese people such as Tibetans and Mongols to stay in China. He proclaimed that Mongolia and Tibet were part of the Republic of China, not independent countries. Ma Fuxiang was loyal to the Chinese government and crushed Muslim rebels when ordered to. Ma Fuxiang believed that modern education would help Hui Chinese build a better society and help China resist foreign imperialism and help build the nation. He was praised for his "guojia yizhi" (national consciousness) by non-Muslims. Ma Fuxiang also published many books, and wrote on Confucianism and Islam, having studied both the Quran and the Spring and Autumn Annals.

Ma Fuxiang had served under the Chinese Muslim general Dong Fuxiang and fought against the foreigners during the Boxer Rebellion. The Muslim unit he served in was noted for being anti-foreign, being involved in shooting a Westerner and a Japanese to death before the Boxer Rebellion broke out. It was reported that the Muslim troops were going to wipe out the foreigners to return a golden age for China, and the Muslims repeatedly attacked foreign churches, railways, and legations, before hostilities even started. The Muslim troops were armed with modern repeater rifles and artillery, and reportedly enthusiastic about going on the offensive and killing foreigners. Ma Fuxiang led an ambush against the foreigners at Langfang and inflicted many casualties, using a train to escape. Dong Fuxiang was a xenophobe and hated foreigners, wanting to drive them out of China.

Various Muslim organizations in China like the Islamic Association of China and the Chinese Muslim Association were sponsored by the Kuomintang and the Chinese Communist Party.

Chinese Muslim imams had synthesized Islam and Confucianism in the Han Kitab. They asserted that there was no contradiction between Confucianism and Islam, and no contradiction between being a Chinese national and a Muslim. Chinese Muslim students returning from study abroad, from places such as Al-Azhar University in Egypt, learned about nationalism and advocated Chinese nationalism at home. One Imam, Wang Jingzhai, who studied at Mecca, translated a Hadith, or saying of Muhammad, "Aiguo Aijiao": loving the country is equivalent to loving the faith. Chinese Muslims believed that their "Watan" (Arabic: وطن, lit. 'country; homeland') was the whole of the Republic of China, non-Muslims included.

General Bai Chongxi, the warlord of Guangxi, and a member of the Kuomintang, presented himself as the protector of Islam in China and harbored Muslim intellectuals fleeing from the Japanese invasion in Guangxi. General Bai preached Chinese nationalism and anti-imperialism. Chinese Muslims were sent to Saudi Arabia and Egypt to denounce the Japanese. Translations from Egyptian writings and the Quran were used to support propaganda in favour of a Jihad against Japan.

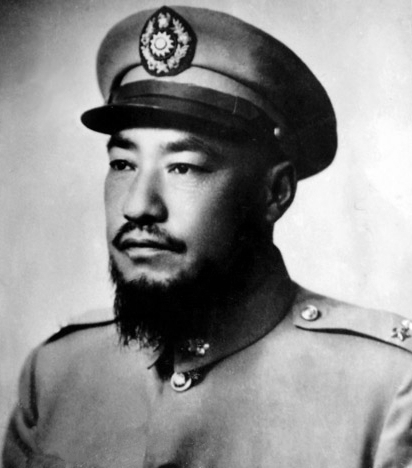
Ma Bufang, a Chinese Muslim general

Ma Bufang, a Chinese Muslim general who was part of the Kuomintang, supported Chinese nationalism and tolerance between the different Chinese ethnic groups. The Japanese tried to approach him to gain his support but were unsuccessful. Ma presented himself as a Chinese nationalist who fought against Western imperialism to the people of China to deflect criticism by opponents that his government was feudal and that it oppressed minorities like the Tibetans and Buddhist Mongols. He presented himself as a Chinese nationalist to his advantage to keep himself in power, as noted by the author Uradyn Erden Bulag.

In Xinjiang, the Chinese Muslim general Ma Hushan supported Chinese nationalism. He was chief of the 36th Division of the National Revolutionary Army. He spread anti-Soviet and anti-Japanese propaganda and instituted a colonial regime over the Uyghurs. Uyghur street names and signs were changed to Chinese, and the Chinese Muslim troops imported Chinese cooks and baths, rather than use Uyghur ones. The Chinese Muslims even forced the Uyghur carpet industry at Khotan to change its design to Chinese versions. Ma proclaimed his loyalty to Nanjing, denounced Sheng Shicai as a Soviet puppet, and fought against him in 1937.

The Tungans (Hui Chinese Muslims) also had anti-Japanese sentiment.

General Ma Hushan's brother Ma Zhongying denounced separatism in a speech at Id Kah Mosque and told the Uyghurs to be loyal to the Chinese government at Nanjing. The 36th division had crushed the Turkish Islamic Republic of East Turkestan, and the Chinese Muslim general Ma Zhancang beheaded the Uyghur emirs Abdullah Bughra and Nur Ahmad Jan Bughra. Ma Zhancang abolished the Sharia, the Islamic law, which was set up by the Uyghurs. He set up military rule instead, retained the former Chinese officials, and kept them in power. The Uyghurs had been promoting Islamism in their separatist government, but Ma Hushan eliminated religion from politics. Islam was barely mentioned or used in politics or life except as a vague spiritual focus for unified opposition against the Soviet Union.

The Uyghur warlord Yulbars Khan was pro-Chinese and supported the Republic of China. The Uyghur politician Masud Sabri served as the governor of Xinjiang Province from 1947 to 1949.

==== Tibetans ====
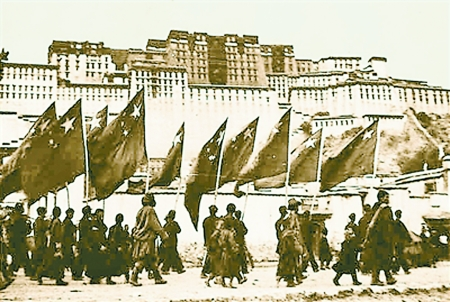
The People's Republic of China took over the capital Lhasa during its annexation by China in 1951

Pandatsang Rapga, a Tibetan politician, founded the Tibet Improvement Party with the goal of modernisation and integration of Tibet into the Republic of China.

The 9th Panchen Lama, Thubten Choekyi Nyima, was considered extremely "pro-Chinese" according to official Chinese sources.

==== Mongols ====
Many of the Chinese troops that occupied Mongolia in 1919 were Chahar Mongols; that has been a major cause for animosity between the Khalkhas and the Inner Mongols.

==== Manchus ====
During the late Qing dynasty, revolutionaries, especially Zou Rong, incited anti-Manchuism to overthrow the dynasty.

A controversial topic of Chinese history is the debate on the extent to which the Mongol-led Yuan dynasty and the Manchu-led Qing dynasty represented China as a nation because of the non-Han identity of the ruling dynasties.

== In Taiwan ==
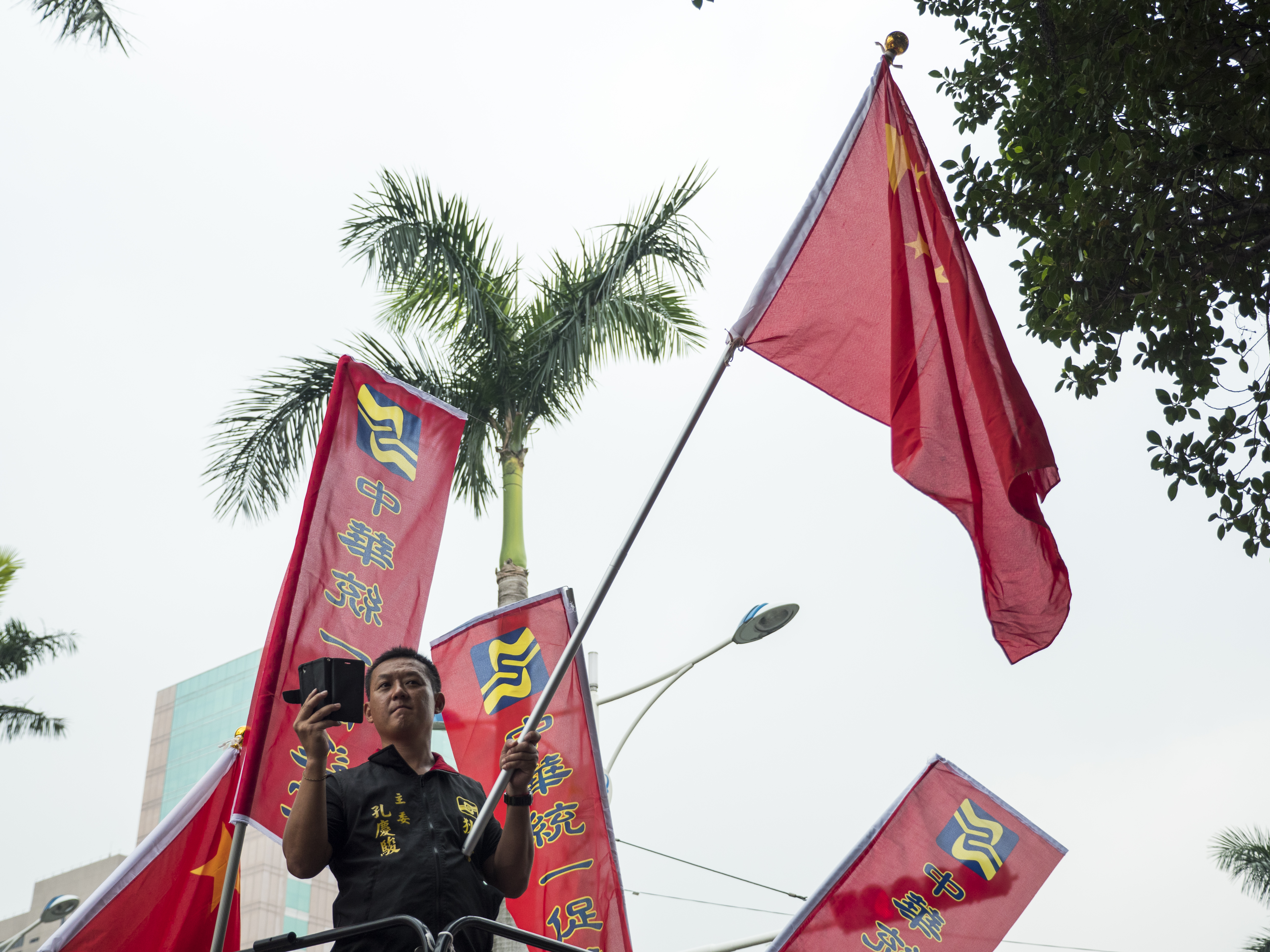
Rally organized by the Chinese Unification Promotion Party in Taiwan.

During the Taiwan under Japanese rule (1895–1945), Chinese nationalism was not a contrasting concept with Taiwanese nationalism, but rather groups advocating for "independence" from Japan sometimes put forward both ethnic Han "Chinese" and regional "Taiwanese" identities at the same time. Typically, Taiwanese People's Party programs were heavily inspired by Sun Yat-sen's Three Principles of the People, and utilized a Taiwanese nationalism as part of a broader Chinese nationalism. It also adopted Kuomintang-style socialism.

One common goal of current Chinese government is the unification of mainland China and Taiwan. It is the commonly-stated goal of both the People's Republic of China and the Republic of China (Taiwan) before 1992, but both sides differ sharply in the form of unification because of their differences in political ideology. Chinese nationalists on Taiwan can be divided between those who uphold the legitimacy of the Republic of China (i.e. the Pan-Blue Coalition) and those who support the People's Republic of China (i.e. the Pro-Beijing camp).

In Taiwan, there is a general consensus to support the status quo of Taiwan's de facto independence as a separate nation. However, the relationship between Chinese nationalism and Taiwan remains controversial, involving symbolic issues such as the use of the "Republic of China" as the official name of the government on Taiwan and the use of the word "China" in the name of government-owned corporations. There is little support in Taiwan for immediate unification. Overt support for formal independence is also muted since the PRC insists on military action if Taiwan makes such a formal declaration. The argument against unification is partly over culture and whether democratic Taiwanese should see themselves as Chinese or Taiwanese; and partly over mistrust of the authoritarian Chinese Communist Party (CCP), its human rights record, and its de-democratizing actions in Hong Kong (e.g. 2014–2015 Hong Kong electoral reform, which sparked the Umbrella Movement). Those misgivings are particularly prevalent among younger generations of Taiwanese, who generally consider themselves to have little or no connection to China.

Historically, Taiwan under Japanese rule had Chinese nationalist groups, such as the Taiwanese People's Party whose ideology utilised Chinese nationalism from the Three Principles of the People to resist Japanese colonialism and foment the re-annexation of Japanese Taiwan back to Chinese rule.

Chinese nationalists in both mainland China and Taiwan deem supporters of Taiwan independence to be hanjian (traitors). In 2015, Kuomintang legislators and then-incumbent President Ma Ying-jeou accused former ROC president and Taiwan independence supporter Lee Teng-hui, who had also served in the Imperial Japanese Army, of being a hanjian.

There are "far-right" Chinese nationalist groups in Taiwan that support immediate unification with China, through more radical means. Some radical Chinese nationalist groups in Taiwan include the Patriot Alliance Association founded in 1993 and the Chinese Unification Promotion Party founded by Taiwanese mafia leader Chang An-lo. The former has engaged in combating the influence of Falun Gong in Taiwan, while the latter has been accused of violence against Hong Kong opposition figures such as Denise Ho and Lam Wing-kee. The National Socialism Association, a neo-Nazi and Chinese ultranationalist organisation in Taiwan, follows a mixture of National Socialism and Chiangism. It called for a Chinese reunification under a new fascist ROC dictatorship and retaking of the mainland through military conquest.

== Nationalist symbology ==
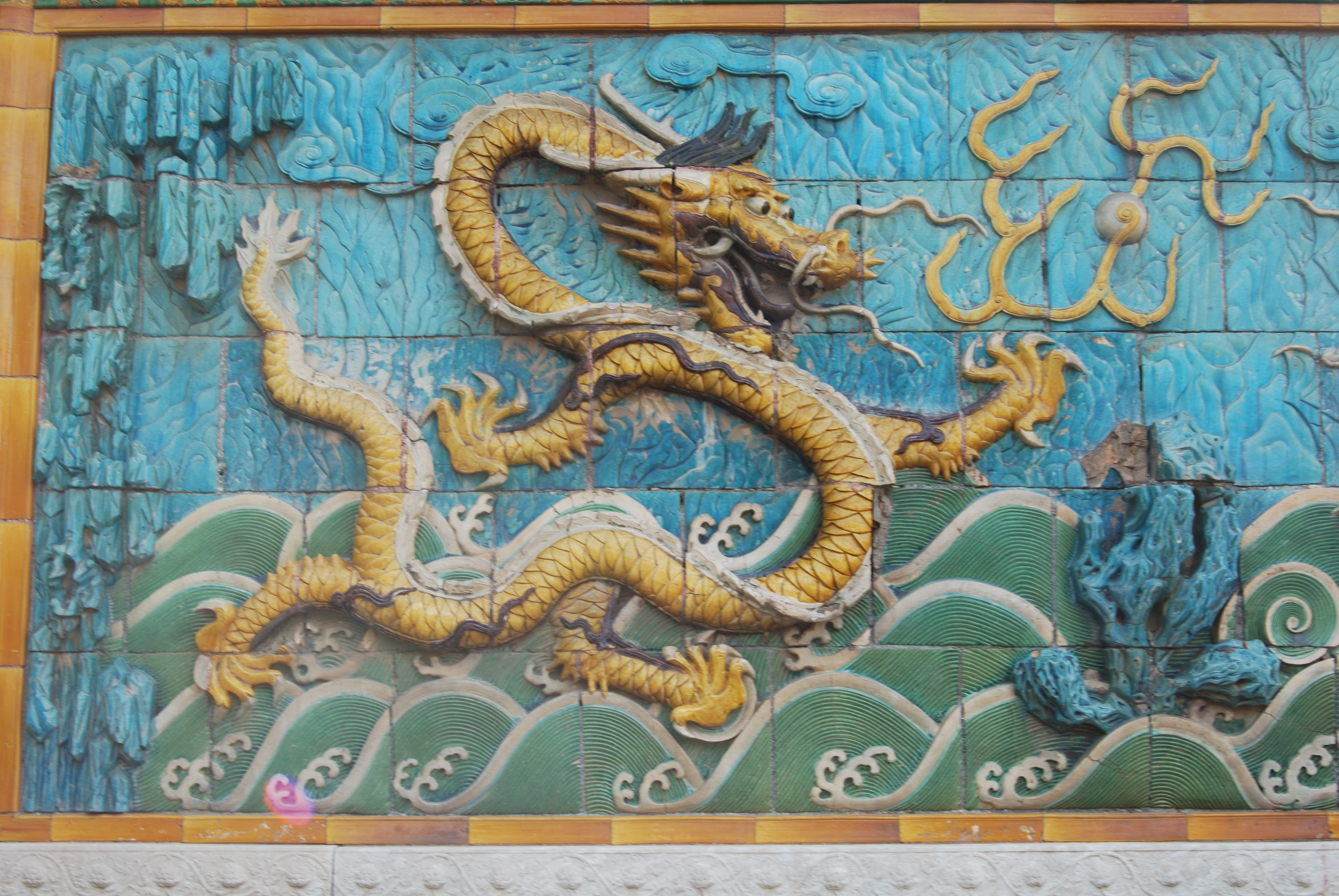
A Chinese dragon on the Nine-Dragon Wall at the Forbidden City in Beijing.

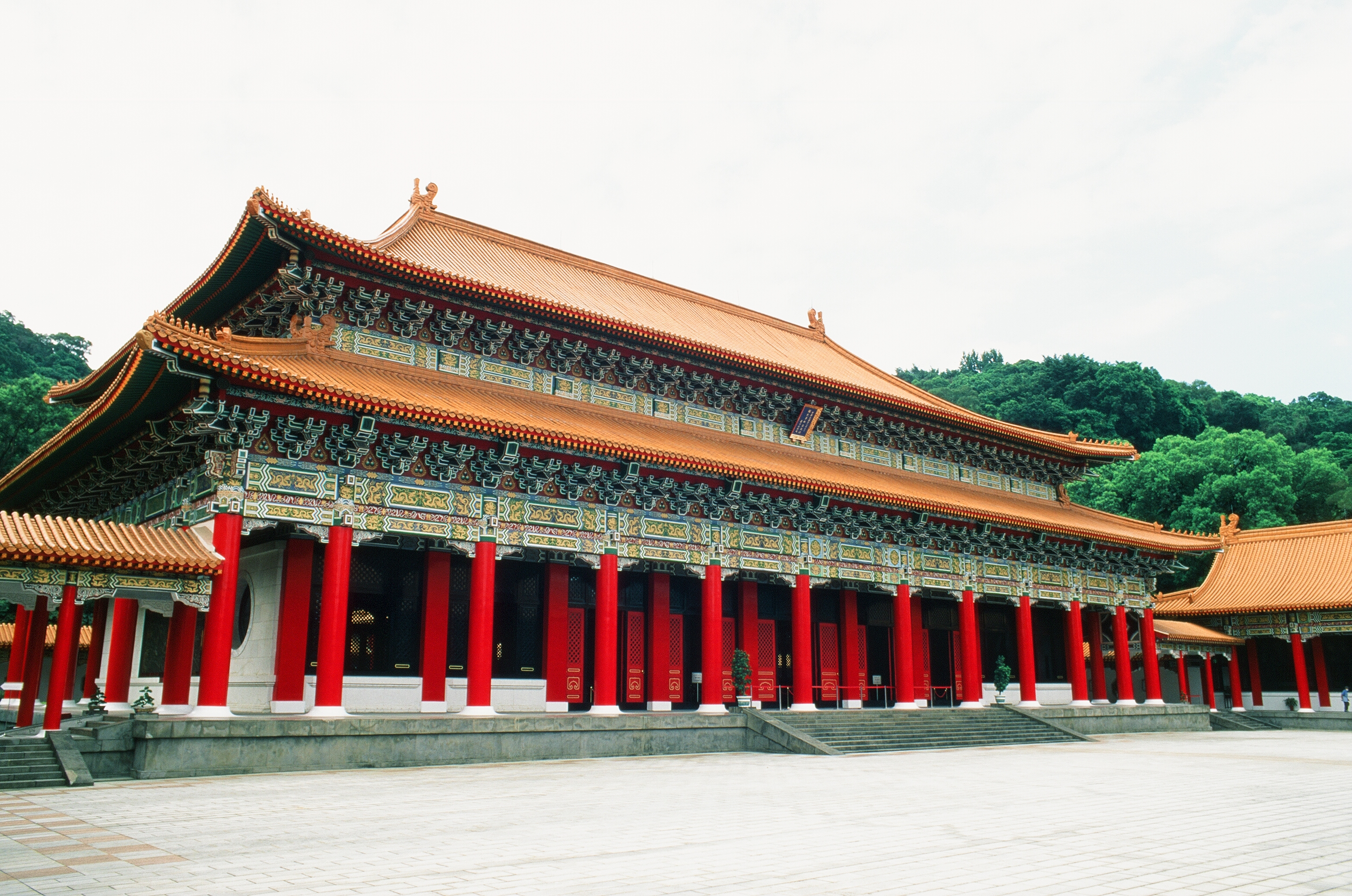
National Revolutionary Martyrs' Shrine in Taipei.

The plum blossom symbol in the Republic of China

In addition to the national symbols of China, the national symbols of the Republic of China, and the flags of China, there are many symbols opted for use by Chinese nationalists. Some of these include Chinese legendary or ancient figures such as the Yellow Emperor and the Fire Emperor, Yu the Great, Qin Shi Huang, or more modern figures such as Sun Yat-sen, Chiang Kai-shek, and Mao Zedong. At the turn of the 20th century, both conservative and progressive nationalists adopted the myth of the Yellow Emperor as a symbol of the Chinese nation.

Another symbol often used is the Chinese dragon as a personification for the Chinese nation.

Militaristic forms of Chinese nationalism have also embraced martyrs' shrines, which memorialize and praise martyrs (typically Chinese soldiers) who fought for China, such as in the Second Sino-Japanese War. Soldiers and other war heroes of China (both ROC and PRC) are enshrined at these shrines. The martyrs' shrines are the Chinese equivalent to the Japanese Gokoku shrines, such as Yasukuni Shrine.

Similar to the use of the chrysanthemum, which also has cultural significance in China, in Japan as the Imperial Seal of Japan, the plum blossom is also a national symbol of China, as was designated by the Legislative Yuan in the Republic of China on 21 July 1964. It was also proposed to be the national flower of the People's Republic of China. The Republic of China patriotic song The Plum Blossom revolves around its symbolism for China.

In the Republic of China, as the National Flower, the plum blossom symbolizes:

- Three buds and five petals – symbolises Three Principles of the People and the five branches of the government in accordance with the Constitution
- The plum blossom withstands the cold winter (it blossoms more in colder temperatures) – it symbolises the faithful, the resolute and the holy; it represents the national spirit of Republic of China nationals.
- The five petals of the flower – symbolises Five Races Under One Union; it also symbolises Five Cardinal Relationships (五伦; Wǔlún), Five Constants (五常; Wǔcháng) and Five Ethics (五教; Wǔjiào) according to Confucian philosophy, which was national philosophy of imperial China for two millennia until 1912, when the Qing Dynasty was overthrown and the Republic of China was established.
- The branches (枝橫), shadow (影斜), flexibility (曳疏), and cold resistance (傲霜) of the plum blossom also represent the four kinds of noble virtues, "originating and penetrating, advantageous and firm" mentioned in the I Ching (Book of Changes).

== Opposition ==
There are movements for regional secession from China and independence for Taiwan.

The Milk Tea Alliance formed by netizens from Hong Kong, Taiwan, and Thailand began as a reaction against Chinese nationalist commentators online.

Elements of Japanese nationalism are hostile to China. In World War II, the Empire of Japan conquered large swathes of Chinese territory, and many contemporary nationalists in Japan deny the events of the Nanking Massacre.

== Types of Chinese nationalism ==
Whether spontaneous or state-supported, narratives of Chinese nationalism often draw on ancient history, the century of humiliation, themes of national survival, or themes of revival.

=== Populist nationalism ===
Populist nationalism or popular nationalism (Chinese: 民粹民族主義 or simply 民族主義) is a comparatively late development in Chinese nationalism of the 1990s. It began to take recognizable shape after 1996, as a joint result of the evolving nationalist thinking of the early 1990s and the ongoing debates on modernity, postmodernism, postcolonialism, and their political implications-debates that have engaged many Chinese intellectuals since early 1995.

=== State nationalism ===
State nationalism
- Traditional Chinese: 國家主義
- Simplified Chinese: 国家主义
- Literal meaning: Statism
Transcriptions
Standard Mandarin
- Hanyu Pinyin: guójiā zhǔyì
- Bopomofo: ㄍㄨㄛˊ ㄐㄧㄚ ㄓㄨˇ ㄧˋ

Alternative Chinese name
- Traditional Chinese: 中國國家主義
- Simplified Chinese: 中国国家主义
- Literal meaning: Chinese statism
Transcriptions
Standard Mandarin
- Hanyu Pinyin: Zhōngguó guójiā zhǔyì
- Bopomofo: ㄓㄨㄥ ㄍㄨㄛˊ ㄍㄨㄛˊ ㄐㄧㄚ ㄓㄨˇ ㄧˋ

State nationalism, state-led nationalism or simply "statism" is nationalism from above, in contrast to popular nationalism. State nationalism was strongly advocated by incumbent political elites in both the regimes of the Kuomintang (KMT) and the Chinese Communist Party (CCP); past KMT or present CCP-led state nationalism advocates Chinese nationalism and equates 'nation'/'state' (國家) and 'party' (黨) to build a one-party system. Chinese state nationalism is also considered an authoritarian form of civic nationalism.

State nationalism has not made the PRC's international behaviour particularly aggressive or inflexible, according to most observers, but rather cautious and opportunistic. Academic Frances Yaping Wang states that "[i]f we liken nationalism to a pet dragon under the control of state authorities in China, we could say that the state keeps it alive and occasionally provokes it, as long as it does not breathe fire. However, when it does and oversteps its bounds occasionally, the state master reins it in to ensure the flames do not harm them." Academic Suisheng Zhao writes that the rise of "state-led pragmatic nationalism" in 1990s China was an instrumental response to the dissolution of the Soviet Union.

A feature of Chinese state nationalism in the PRC is that it is CCP-centred; it regards the party as an embodiment of the nation's will and the nation as a means rather than an end in itself. Accordingly, its primary objective is 'stability' for the party-state, even though it is keen to maintain national identity, national unity and national autonomy.

A group of Chinese "statist" legal scholars is influencing the authoritarian policies of the Chinese government, which, influenced by the ultraconservative and Nazi German legal theorist Carl Schmitt, values "state authority". The statists are also related to the Chinese government's reduction of autonomy over Hong Kong.

Hong Kong and Taiwanese nationalists who are critical of Chinese nationalism are especially critical of Chinese state nationalism.

=== Ethnic nationalism ===
Ethnic nationalism (Chinese: 族群民族主義 or 族群主義) is divided into two forms in China; based on the dominant ethnic-centered "Han nationalism" (or Han chauvinism) and ethnic minorities based "local ethnic nationalism". The Chinese Communist Party (CCP) opposes singular ethnic nationalism and encourages multi-ethnic nationalism under the overarching concept of the Zhonghua minzu. At the same time, the CCP portrays itself as the custodian of a conservative, Han-centric vision of "China's outstanding traditional culture".

Under Chinese nationalism, there has been a smaller subset of Han-centric ethnonationalism that has been on the rise in recent years, referred to as the "Huang Han movement" (Chinese: 皇漢), literally meaning "Imperial Han". Similar to Yamato nationalism in Japan, which places the Yamato as the nucleus of Japanese civilisation, the Huang Han movement places the Han as the nucleus of Chinese civilisation. The Huang Han movement is closely tied to, and often expressed visually in public through the Hanfu movement seeking to revive traditional Chinese clothing from pre-Qing China, as Chinese clothing underwent heavy Manchu influence during the Qing dynasty, shaping the perception of foreigners on traditional Chinese clothing. That being said, the mainstream Hanfu movement is used as a form of cultural expression and nationalism, while it is used by Huang Han nationalists to express themselves visually through the way they dress.

The Huang Han nationalist ideology is built around the "1644 Historical Perspective" (Chinese: 1644史觀), a belief that Chinese civilization was disrupted in 1644 when the Manchu Qing state conquered the Han-ruled Ming state. The Qing is viewed as an illegitimate and as conquering foreign dynasty by Huang Han nationalists. Although Huang Han nationalists are broadly aligned with the views of the Chinese government and mainstream Chinese nationalism, they have periodically clashed with mainstream nationalists as well as been cracked down on by the Chinese government. The lead actor of the 2015 film Wolf Warrior, Wu Jing, often seen as a personality of Chinese nationalism and whose film is the source of the modern "wolf warrior diplomacy" label (referring to confrontational Chinese diplomatic rhetoric), has been repeatedly subject to online attacks by Han nationalists due to his Manchu heritage. Chinese state media has spoken out against the "1644 Historical Perspective" on the grounds that it supposedly disrupts ethnic harmony between the ethnicities of China.

Since the mid-1990s, the CCP has utilized Peking Man as an instrument of its racial nationalist discourse. The Chinese government has also pursued ethno-nationalist policies aimed at appealing to overseas Chinese.

=== Northern and Southern ===
In 1995, American scholar Edward Friedman contended that there is a northern governmental, political, bureaucratic Chinese nationalism that is at odds with a southern, commercial Chinese nationalism.

=== Ultranationalism ===
Ultranationalism (极端民族主义; 極端民族主義) was born out of Chiang Kai-shek Thought and the pro-Chiang Blue Shirts Society during the Nationalist government. Led by Chiang Kai-shek's Kuomintang, China had friendly diplomatic relations with Nazi Germany, until the Second Sino-Japanese War when Germany eventually favoured Japan diplomatically.

== Modern times ==
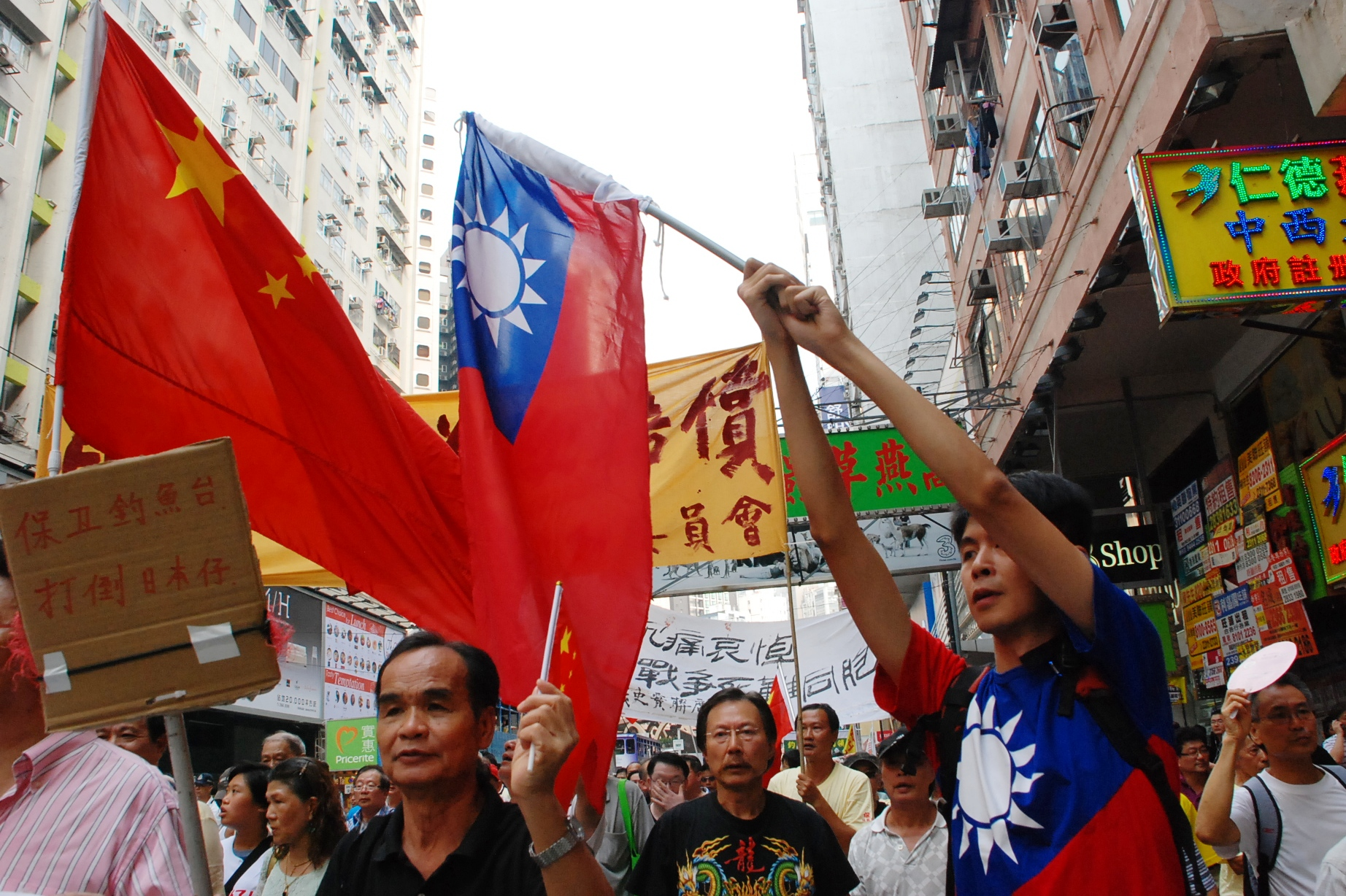
2012 Chinese anti-Japan protest in Hong Kong, with protesters waving the flags of the PRC and ROC

During the Cold War era, American strategies to contain the spread of communism fueled nationalist sentiment in China, including as a result of the Korean War, the Taiwan Strait Crisis, the PRC's exclusion from the United Nations, and the U.S. embargo of China.

The end of the Cold War has seen the revival throughout the world of nationalist sentiments and aspirations, nationalism is seen as increasing the legitimacy of Chinese Communist Party rule. It has been pursued in a more pragmatic and flexible manner compared to policies during the Cultural Revolution. One remarkable phenomenon in the post-Cold War upsurge of Chinese nationalism is that Chinese intellectuals became one of the driving forces. Many well-educated people-social scientists, humanities scholars, writers, and other professionals have given voice to and even become articulators for rising nationalistic discourse in the 1990s. Some commentators have proposed that "positive nationalism" could be an important unifying factor for the country as it has been for other countries.

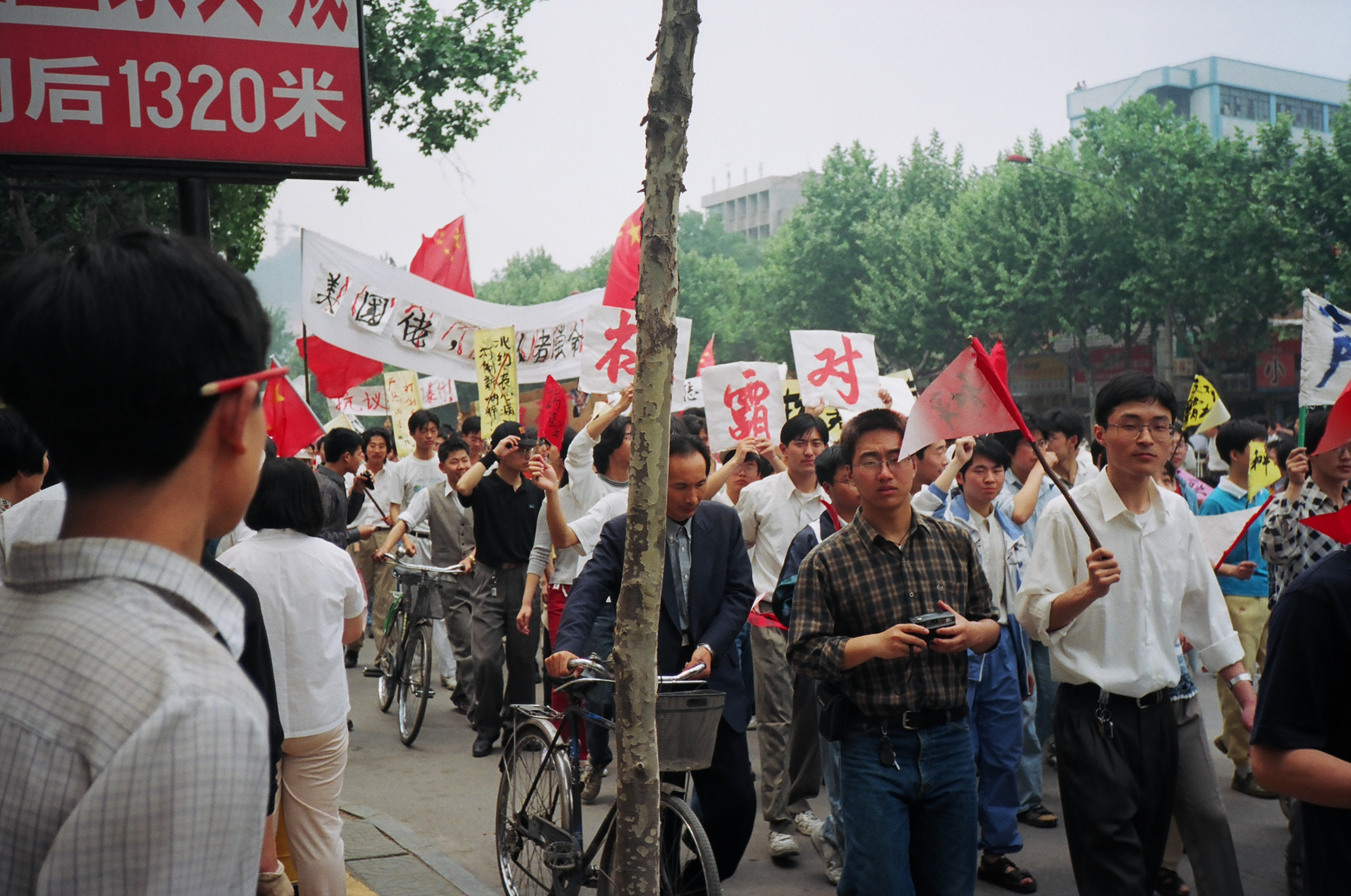
Anti-American protests in Nanjing following the U.S. bombing of the Chinese embassy in Belgrade, 1999

On 7 May 1999, during the NATO bombing of Yugoslavia, the United States bombed the Chinese embassy in Belgrade, killing three Chinese citizens. The US claimed that the bombing was an accident caused by the use of outdated maps, but few Chinese accepted this explanation. The incident caused widespread anger, and following the attack Chinese officials described the bombing as a "barbarian act" and a "war crime", while Chinese students in Europe and America demonstrated against 'NATO fascism'. In China, thousands were involved in protest marches in Beijing and other provincial capitals. Some protesters threw gas bombs and rocks at the diplomatic missions of the United States and other NATO countries, while in Chengdu the American Consul's residence was firebombed, deepening anti-Western and anti-American sentiment in China. China, along with Russia, had already supported Slobodan Milošević and the Federal Republic of Yugoslavia during the Kosovo War, and opposed NATO bombings of Yugoslavia.

The 1995 book China Can Say No, itself based on the 1989 essay The Japan That Can Say No by Shintaro Ishihara, was a benchmark for 1990s nationalist sentiment. Nationalist online forums including Strong China Forum and Iron Blood became popular forums for expression of nationalist sentiment on the internet. The internet has since continued to increase in significance as a forum for Chinese nationalism.

In the 21st century, notable spurs of grassroots Chinese nationalism grew from what the Chinese public saw as the marginalization of their country from Japan and the Western world. One such event occurred in the Hainan Island incident of April 1, 2001, in which a United States US EP-3 surveillance aircraft collided mid-air with a Chinese Shenyang J-8 jet fighter over the South China Sea. China sought a formal apology, and CCP General Secretary Jiang Zemin accepted United States Secretary of State Colin Powell's expression of "very sorry" as sufficient. The incident nonetheless created negative feelings towards the United States by the Chinese public and increased public feelings of Chinese nationalism.

The Japanese history textbook controversies, as well as Prime Minister Junichiro Koizumi's visits to the Yasukuni Shrine was the source of considerable anger on Chinese blogs. In addition, the protests following the 2008 Tibetan unrest of the Olympic torch has gathered strong opposition within the Chinese community inside China and abroad. Almost every Tibetan protest on the Olympic torch route was met with a considerable pro-China protest. Because the 2008 Summer Olympics were a major source of national pride, anti-Olympics sentiments are often seen as anti-Chinese sentiments inside China. Moreover, the Sichuan earthquake in 2008 sparked a high sense of nationalism from the Chinese at home and abroad. The central government's quick response to the disaster was instrumental in galvanizing general support from the population amidst harsh criticism directed towards China's handling of the Lhasa riots only two months earlier. In 2005, anti-Japanese demonstrations were held throughout Asia as a result of events such as the Japanese history textbook controversies. In 2012, people across mainland China, Hong Kong, and Taiwan held anti-Japanese protests because of the escalating Senkaku Islands dispute.

Nationalism was witnessed at the 2008 Olympic torch relay where pro-Olympic protests were held by overseas Chinese in response to disruptions by anti-China activists in Paris and London. At least 5,000 Chinese Americans including immigrants from mainland China, Hong Kong, Taiwan and Southeast Asia also protested outside CNN's Hollywood offices after CNN commentator Jack Cafferty described Chinese products as "junk" and the Chinese as "goons" and "thugs" during a segment about China's relationship with America. When the Olympic torch passed through Paris, a pro-Tibetan independence protestor attempted to snatch it from a young handicapped Chinese athlete who clung to it. The images were widely televised and led to an internet rumor that accused French supermarket company Carrefour of funding Tibetan independence groups. Protests and calls for boycott resulted and ultimately subsided, in part because of efforts by French officials to apologize for the Paris torch attack.

A 2013 survey of Chinese adults found that respondents who sourced their information about the dispute from traditional mass media, which are more subject to state regulation, were less supportive of the idea that China should adopt hardline policies in the South China Sea territorial disputes. The researchers who conducted the survey concluded that China's state-media coverage of the dispute was "more of a dampener than a driver of nationalistic policy preference."

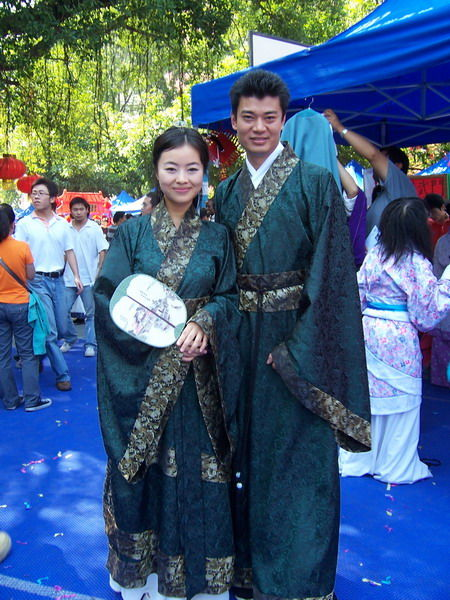
Two hanfu promoters at the Chinese Cultural Festival in Guangzhou

Another example of modern nationalism in China is the hanfu movement, which is a Chinese movement in the early 21st century that seeks the revival of Chinese traditional clothing. There has been an entire culture and economy built around this movement with Xi'An alone having over 3000 HanFu clothing rental shops. In 2025 the online orders for HanFu had spiked 662% compared to a year prior, showing a rising popularity of Han nationalism and the Hanfu movement amongst the younger generation in China.

The China–United States trade war also fueled nationalist sentiment among both CCP leadership and the general public. The external pressure of the trade war allowed Xi Jinping to point to the United States' actions as a reason for China's economic slowdown. The Chinese public responded. The academic Suisheng Zhao summarizes, "Proud of their accomplishments through hard work, tremendous sacrifices, dogged determination, and well-crafted policies, many Chinese are fed up with US criticisms that China's rise is because it did not play by rules, violated international commitments, and tilted the playing field to advantage Chinese firms."

Credit Suisse has determined through a 2018 survey that young Chinese consumers are turning to local brands as a result of growing nationalism. Local brands like Lenovo have also received backlash from some online Chinese for being unpatriotic.

On 1 July 2021, Xi Jinping delivered a nationalistic speech at Tiananmen Square in connection with the celebration of the 100th Anniversary of the Chinese Communist Party. Xi said, "The Chinese people will never allow foreign forces to bully, oppress, or enslave us," and "whoever nurses delusions of doing that will crack their heads and spill blood on the Great Wall of steel built from the flesh and blood of 1.4 billion Chinese people." (Note: Chinese: 中国人民从来没有欺负、压迫、奴役过其他国家人民，过去没有，现在没有，将来也不会有。同时，中国人民也绝不允许任何外来势力欺负、压迫、奴役我们，谁妄想这样干，必将在14亿多中国人民用血肉筑成的钢铁长城面前碰得头破血流！)

In 2021, Hannah Bailey, a researcher of Chinese internet censorship at the University of Oxford's Internet Institute, noted a shift in China's approach toward deriving legitimacy from nationalism, compared to the earlier approach based on its economic performance.

=== Internet activism ===
Nationalism on the internet is varied, with different groupings approaching the issues from various perspectives. Publishing in 2025, journalist Shuyu Zhang writes that this "new patriotism" includes groups like "overseas-educated students who deromanticize and subsequently distance themselves from Western ideals; 'patriots' who have faith in the China model and pride in a rising China; populists who see China as a victim of Western hegemony; and, lately, 'fan girls' who adopt 'fan club culture' in their patriotism" such as Little Pink.

In the 1990s, nationalists among the Chinese public were primarily connected through the internet. Forums for online nationalist discourses in China have included SonicBBS (now defunct) and Dragon Sky (lkong.com).

In 2005, twenty-two million Chinese netizens signed an internet petition in opposition to Japan's efforts to join the United Nations Security Council.

In response to protests during the 2008 Olympic Torch Relay, the Chinese blogosphere became filled with nationalistic material, many of which highlighted perceived biases and inaccuracies in the Western media such as photos of clashes between police and Tibetan independence protestors that took place in Nepal and India but were captioned to seem as if the events happened in China. The student-founded website Anti-CNN claimed that news channels such as CNN and BBC pushed false narratives about and reported only selectively on the 2008 Tibetan unrest.

Chinese hackers have claimed to have attacked the CNN website numerous times, through the use of DDoS attacks. Similarly, the Yasukuni Shrine website was hacked by Chinese hackers during late 2004, and another time on 24 December 2008.

Nationalists began developing a reputation for cross-platform online "expeditions" through their response to perceptions of Taiwanese independence sentiment in 2015–2016. "Expeditions" are self-organized and intense waves of cross-platform hostile communication towards individuals or groups with different political stances.

During the 2019–2020 Hong Kong protests, in response to protestors doxing police officers and people unsupportive of the protests, some Chinese nationalists in Hong Kong responded by doxing protestors. A game was also created, called Everyone Hit the Traitors, in which players could beat up protestors and their financial and political backers, such as Joshua Wong, Martin Lee, and Jimmy Lai. The game was made in response to another game, Liberate Hong Kong, where players play as protestors fighting the police.

After the COVID-19 pandemic, online nationalist sentiment increased, in part due to the Chinese public's view that the country had handled the pandemic successfully. Academic Guobin Yang writes that COVID-era nationalism in China (like wolf warrior diplomacy), should be understood "in the context of an already emerging culture of cybernationalist and global populism."

During the Russo-Ukrainian War (in particular the Russian invasion of Ukraine), nationalistic netizens disseminated pro-Russian sentiments and posted pro-Russian posts across the Chinese internet. Online representations of Russian women across the Chinese internet have been described as gendered nationalism or nationalistic sexism. Chinese nationalists and Russian nationalists share common anti-Western sentiments.

In 2024, the term "low-level red" entered official discourse, which describes content intended to praise the CCP or the government but which is deemed as having the opposite effect because it is superficial, ill-conceived, or not genuine. Internet users may also use the phrase more generally to criticize what they view as cheap displays of nationalism or pro-CCP sentiment.

=== Xi Jinping and the "Chinese Dream" ===
As Xi Jinping solidified his control after 2012, became the general secretary of the Chinese Communist Party, the CCP has used the phrase "Chinese Dream", to describe his overarching plans for China. Xi first used the phrase during a high-profile visit to the National Museum of China on 29 November 2012, where he and his Standing Committee colleagues were attending a "national revival" (民族复兴; more commonly translated as "national rejuvenation", to differentiate from national awakening) exhibition. Since then, the phrase has become the signature political slogan of the Xi era. In the public media, the Chinese Dream and nationalism are interwoven. In diplomacy, the Chinese dream and nationalism have been closely linked to the Belt and Road Initiative. Peter Ferdinand argues that it thus becomes a dream about a future in which China "will have recovered its rightful place."
