= Debate on the Chineseness of the Yuan and Qing dynasties =

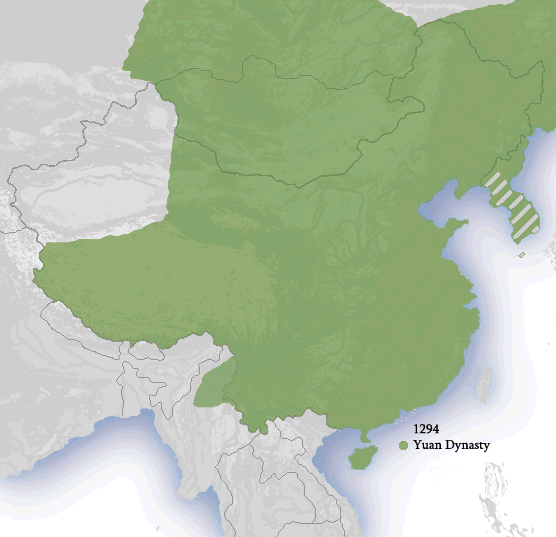
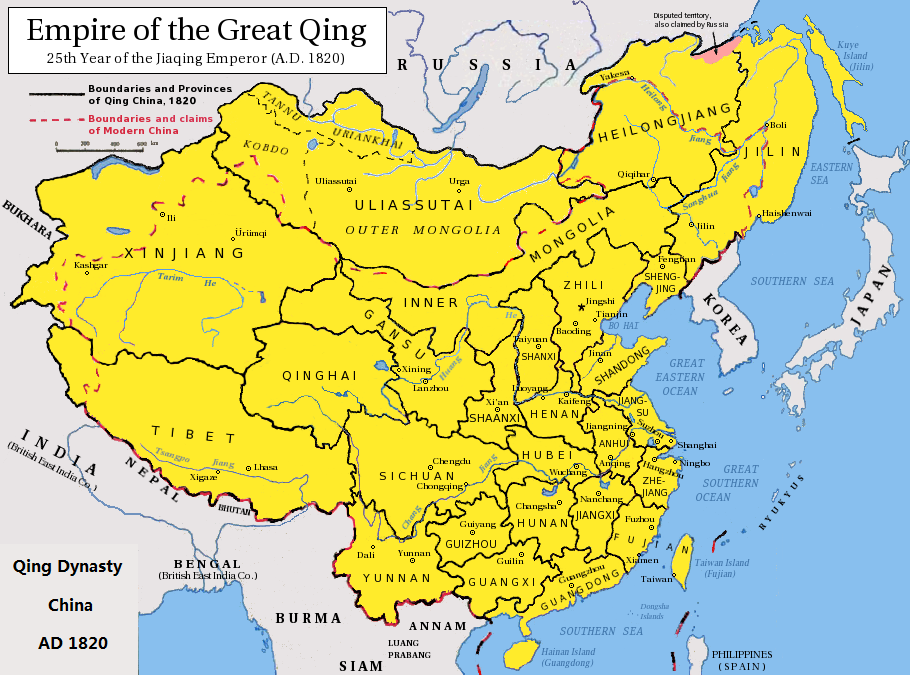
The maximum territorial extent of the Yuan dynasty (top) and the Qing dynasty (bottom).

The debate on the "Chineseness" of the Yuan and Qing dynasties is concerned with whether the Mongol-led Yuan dynasty and the Manchu-led Qing dynasty can be considered "Chinese dynasties", and whether they were representative of "China" during their respective historical periods. The debate, although historiographical in nature, has political implications. Mainstream academia and successive governments of China, including the imperial governments of the Yuan and Qing dynasties, have maintained the view that they were "Chinese" and representative of "China". The debate stemmed from differing opinions on whether regimes founded by ethnic minorities could be representative of "China", where the Han people was and remains the majority.

== Background ==
=== Origin and development ===
The debate emerged following the Meiji Restoration in Japan. In their attempt to rationalize the debate, some Japanese scholars deliberately conflated the concepts of "China" and "China proper", in the process diminishing the scope of the former. The position that the Yuan and Qing dynasties were "non-Chinese" was later adopted by some late-Qing anti-Manchu revolutionaries who had lived in Japan. Zhang Binglin, for instance, in a work titled On the Chinese Republic (中華民國解), proposed that a potential Chinese republican state to be founded in the event of a Qing collapse should only comprise regions influenced by Han culture, and that non-Han regions were outside of "China".

Furthermore, to serve Japanese political agenda, some Japanese academics and politicians like Yano Jinichi and Ishiwara Kanji made a distinction between "China" and the "Qing dynasty"; and separated Manchuria, Inner Mongolia, and Outer Mongolia from the territorial scope of "China" in their rhetoric to justify the Continental Policy and the Japanese invasion of China.

=== Political significance ===
Whereas there were many regimes in Chinese history that were ruled by non-Han ethnicities, the Yuan and Qing dynasties were the only two that ultimately achieved the unification of China proper. The Qing dynasty, in particular, is noted for having laid the foundation for the modern-day territories of China. Both the People's Republic of China and the Republic of China base their constitutional territorial claims on those of the Qing dynasty, in accordance with the succession of states theory. Denying the "Chineseness" of the Yuan and Qing dynasties thus threatens the territorial integrity of contemporary China. To protect Chinese national and traditional historiographical interests, Chinese historians and governments have rejected the opinion that the Yuan and Qing dynasties were "non-Chinese".

== Opposing positions ==
=== Yuan and Qing as "non-Chinese" dynasties ===
Theory on the non-Chineseness of the Yuan and Qing dynasties
- Traditional Chinese: 元清非中國論
- Simplified Chinese: 元清非中国论
- Literal meaning: Theory on the non-Chineseness of the Yuan and Qing
Transcriptions
Standard Mandarin
- Hanyu Pinyin: Yuán Qīng fēi Zhōngguó lùn

Alternative Chinese name
- Traditional Chinese: 滿蒙非中國論
- Simplified Chinese: 满蒙非中国论
- Literal meaning: Theory on the non-Chineseness of the Manchus and Mongols
Transcriptions
Standard Mandarin
- Hanyu Pinyin: Mǎn Měng fēi Zhōngguó lùn

Proponents of the view that the Yuan and Qing dynasties were "non-Chinese" or "foreign" generally equate "Chinese people" with the Han ethnicity, and "China" with the Han-dominated region of China proper. Emphasis is often given to the fact that both regimes and those who founded them did not originate from the Central Plains, the cradle of Han civilization and the heartland of the Han people. Furthermore, the rulers were ethnic In addition, whom the dominant Han people traditionally considered "barbarians", according to the Hua–Yi dichotomy. Thus, during these periods "China" should be perceived as a "colony" of the Mongols and Manchus respectively. By extension, the lands controlled by the Yuan and Qing dynasties, particularly those inhabited by significant non-Han populations, should not be regarded as historical Chinese territories.

Currently, the position is supported by the Central Tibetan Administration, Uyghur separatists, Mongolian nationalists, the extreme part of Han Chinese nationalists, some Western scholars, most of the anti-Chinese movements, and far-right Japanese historians.

Some scholars prefer to view the Yuan and Qing dynasties differently. While the Yuan dynasty was officially named "Great Yuan" (大元), in the Mongolian language, "Dai Ön", a borrowing from the Chinese name, was often used in conjunction with "Yeqe Mongɣul Ulus" ("Great Mongol State"), which resulted in the form "Dai Ön Yeqe Mongɣul Ulus" (大元大蒙古國; "Great Yuan–Great Mongol State") or Dai Ön qemeqü Yeqe Mongɣol Ulus ("Great Mongol State called Great Yuan"). Scholars arguing that the Yuan dynasty was "non-Chinese" point to the use of the term "Yeqe Mongɣul Ulus" as indicative of the "non-Chinese" self-conception of the Yuan rulers. On the other hand, while the Qing dynasty was officially named "Great Qing" (大清), its rulers expanded the definition of Zhongguo (China) and used the term to refer to the entire empire. Traditional Tibetan records also appeared to view the two dynasties differently. While Tibet had been controlled by both the Yuan and Qing dynasties, the Yuan rulers were seen as exclusively Mongol by some Tibetan subjects, but Tibetan subjects traditionally perceived the Qing monarchs as "Chinese" and referred to its rulers using the title "Emperor of China" or "Chinese Emperor" (rgya nag gong ma). For example, in the Treaty of Thapathali of 1856 both Tibetans and Nepalese agreed to "regard the Chinese Emperor as heretofore with respect, in accordance with what has been written".

=== Yuan and Qing as "Chinese" dynasties ===
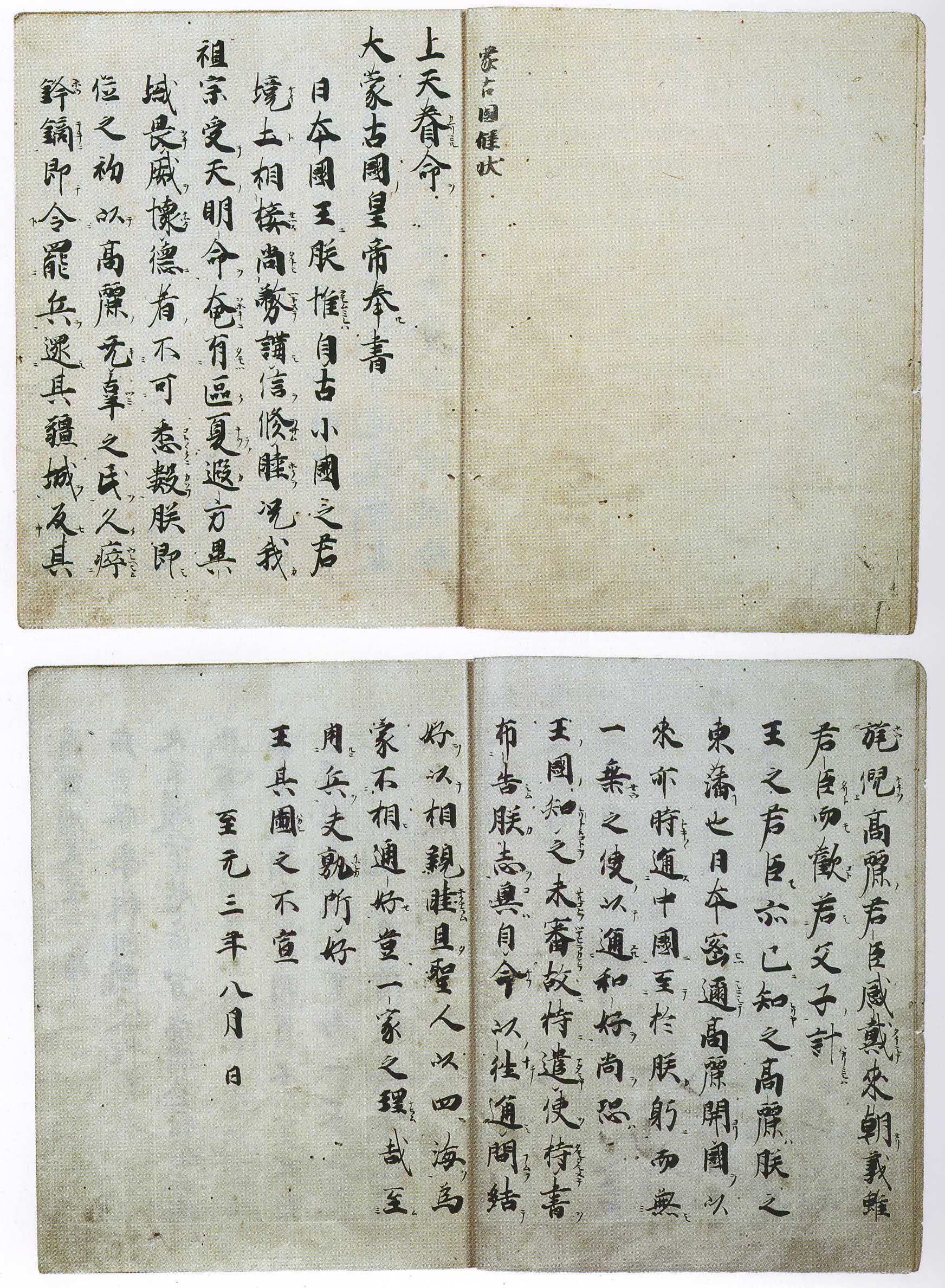
The Ultimatum from the Mongol State by the Emperor Shizu of Yuan designating the Mongol Empire as "China".

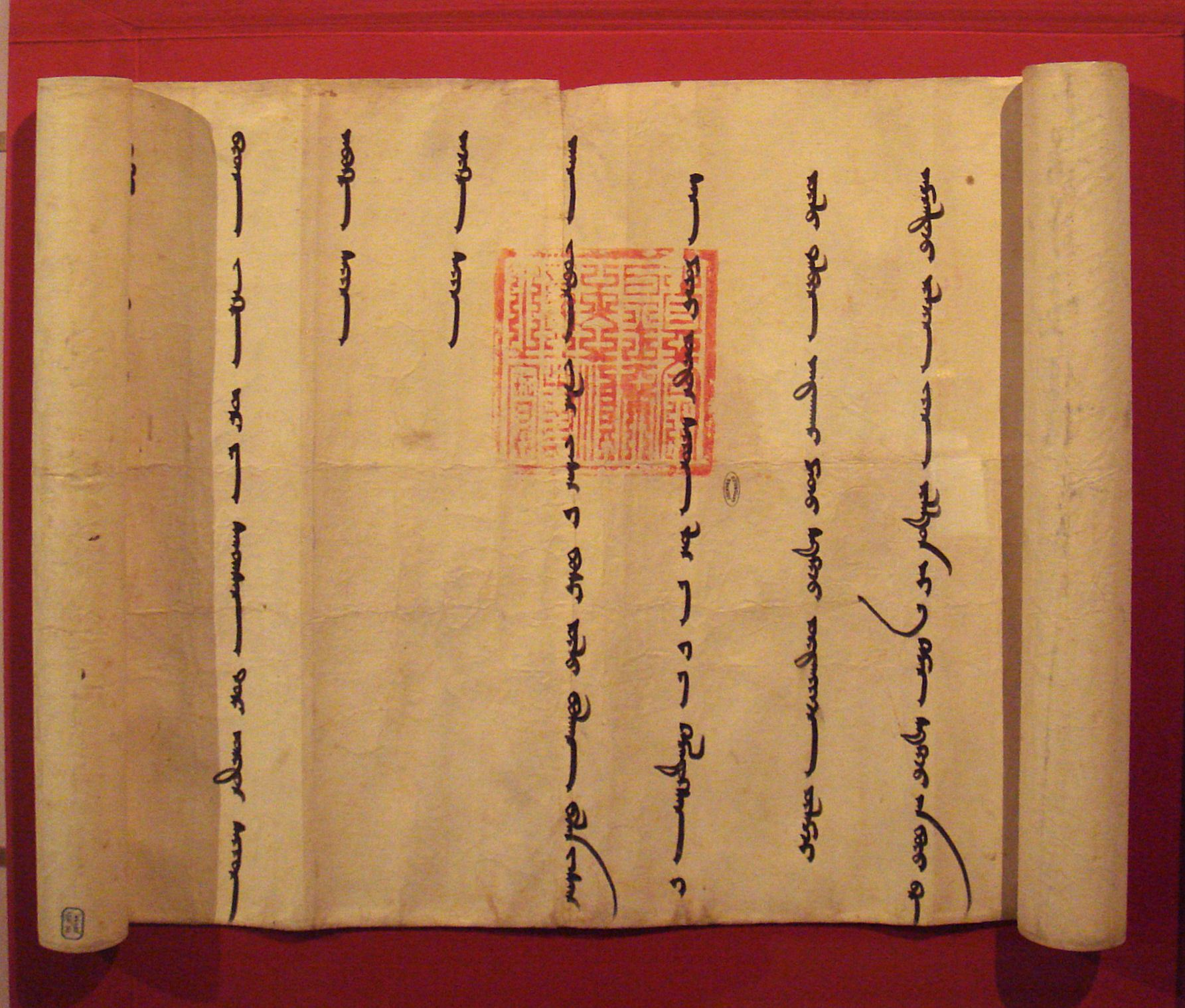
Öljaitü's letter to Philip IV of France bearing the Chinese seal describing the Yuan dynasty as possessing the Mandate of Heaven.

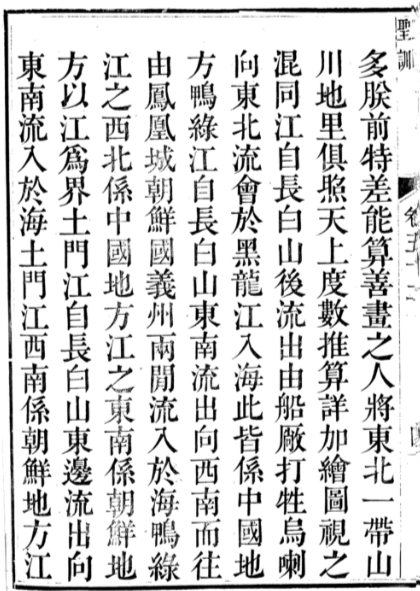
Excerpt from the Veritable Records of the Shengzu of Qing detailing the Kangxi Emperor's proclamation that Manchuria was Chinese territory.

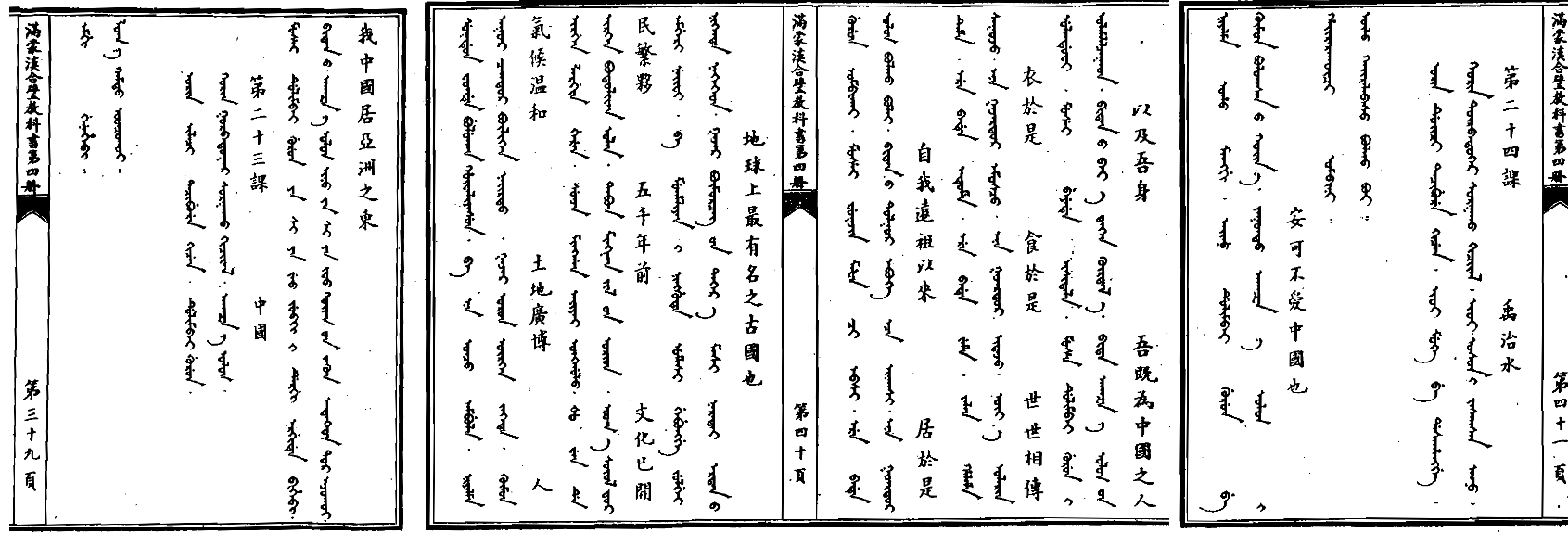
Excerpt from the Manchu–Mongolian–Chinese Interlinear Trilingual Textbook equating the Qing dynasty with "China".

Scholars who uphold the view that both dynasties were "Chinese" find fault with the opposing group's narrow conception of "China" and "Chinese" in cultural, ethnic, and political terms. These scholars posit that "China" and "Chinese" should be best understood as multicultural and multiethnic concepts that transcend the ideological boundaries of contemporary ethnic nationalism. Liang Qichao, for instance, argued that "macro-nationalism" (大民族主義) with its emphasis on a multicultural and multiethnic China could best explain the historical trajectories of China, as opposed to "micro-nationalism" (小民族主義) that foregrounded the Han people at the expense of ethnic minorities. These scholars also criticize the opposing group for retroactively applying modern-day ideologies and constructs such as ethnic nationalism to historical peoples and regimes, resulting in distorted narratives.

The imperial governments of the Yuan and Qing dynasties maintained the view that their regimes were orthodox dynasties of China. In the Ultimatum from the Mongol State issued to the Emperor Kameyama of Japan in 1266, Kublai (Emperor Shizu of Yuan) referred to the Mongol Empire using the term Zhongguo. In 1271, Kublai issued the Edict on the Proclamation of the Dynastic Name, which formally claimed succession from prior Chinese regimes, from the Three Sovereigns and Five Emperors to the Tang dynasty, for the entire Mongol-ruled realm and equated the Mongol Empire with the Yuan dynasty. The edict of enthronement of Temür (Emperor Chengzong of Yuan) proclaimed that Temüjin (Genghis Khan) received the Mandate of Heaven and went on to "establish China (Quxia)"—a traditional Chinese expression referring to the founding of a Chinese dynasty. As evident from the Chinese seal bestowed by Temür to Öljaitü of the Ilkhanate, seen in a letter by Öljaitü to Philip IV of France dated 1305, the Yuan dynasty officially saw itself as possessing the Mandate of Heaven in the traditional Chinese style. Released in 1307 by Khayishan (Emperor Wuzong of Yuan), the edict establishing the Zhida era began with a statement celebrating the Yuan dynasty's "unification of China (Huaxia)". During the reign of Toghon Temür (Emperor Huizong of Yuan), he commissioned the History of Liao, the History of Song, and the History of Jin—a policy in line with Chinese historiographical tradition which reflected the Yuan dynasty's self-conception as a legitimate successor state to the earlier Liao, Song, and Jin dynasties. The History of Jin, in particular, defined Genghis Khan as a Chinese monarch, in the same vein as Liu Bang (Emperor Gao of Han) and Li Shimin (Emperor Taizong of Tang). The Southern Song dynasty, before its eventual conquest by the Yuan dynasty, regarded the Yuan dynasty as the "northern dynasty" of a divided China. Zhu Yuanzhang (Hongwu Emperor), who led a peasant rebellion against and eventually overthrew the Yuan dynasty, accepted the Yuan dynasty as an orthodox Chinese dynasty and ordered the compilation of the History of Yuan to reflect this view. He considered his Ming dynasty to be the legitimate successor of the Yuan dynasty.

Similarly, emperors of the Qing dynasty officially equated their empire with "China" and adopted "Dulimbai Gurun", Manchu for "Zhongguo", as a name for the state. The Qing dynasty was formally conceived as a multiethnic empire and its emperors openly rejected the idea that "Chinese" and "China" only referred to the Han people and the lands that they populated, respectively. In 1711, Xuanye (Kangxi Emperor) publicly proclaimed that the Manchu homeland of Manchuria was part of the "land of China (Zhongguo)". The Records of Great Righteousness Resolving Confusion issued by Yinzhen (Yongzheng Emperor) ridiculed and objected to narratives that depicted the Qing dynasty as "non-Chinese" and "foreign". In official Qing parlance, "Chinese languages" (Dulimbai gurun-i bithe) included Mandarin, Manchu, and Mongolian; while "Chinese people" referred to all subjects of the Qing dynasty, regardless of their ethnicity. When the Qing dynasty annexed Dzungaria in 1759, it was officially proclaimed that the region was "absorbed into China (Dulimbai Gurun)" in a Manchu-language memorial. In addition, terms such as "China", the "Chinese Empire", and the "Empire of China" were used as synonyms for the Qing dynasty in international treaties. For example, the Manchu-language version of the Convention of Kyakhta signed in 1768 with the Russian Empire referred to subjects of the Qing dynasty as "people from the Central Kingdom (Dulimbai Gurun)". Likewise, the Manchu–Mongolian–Chinese Interlinear Trilingual Textbook published by the Qing imperial government also referred to the Qing dynasty as "China" (Zhongguo) and claimed the empire as part of the 5000-year-old Chinese civilization. Like its Yuan predecessor, the Qing dynasty also composed the History of Ming to reflect its position as the orthodox successor to the Ming dynasty. A manifestation of the Qing dynasty's self-conception as a legitimate dynasty of China, Qing emperors periodically carried out imperial worships at the Temple of Monarchs of Successive Dynasties in Beijing, where the spiritual tablets of earlier Chinese rulers and officials of both Han and non-Han ethnic origins, including those of the Mongol Empire and Yuan dynasty, were situated. In deciding the list of worshipped individuals, Hongli (Qianlong Emperor) promoted the idea that the "succession of Chinese (Zhonghua) monarchs" should be understood as an "unbroken lineage reminiscent of a thread", regardless of the ethnicity of the rulers. In 1912, in the name of Puyi (Xuantong Emperor), the Empress Dowager Longyu issued the Imperial Edict of the Abdication of the Qing Emperor, which provided the legal basis for the Republic of China to inherit all Qing territories and be considered as the sole rightful successor to the Qing dynasty, while simultaneously reaffirming that both the Manchus and Mongols belonged to the Chinese nation.

The view that both dynasties were "non-Chinese" is rejected by mainstream academia, as well as the governments of the People's Republic of China and the Republic of China. The Historical Atlas of China, one of the most authoritative works on Chinese historical geography, considered both dynasties to be "Chinese" alongside other polities ruled by non-Han ethnicities. As part of their efforts to maintain Chinese historiographical tradition and make known the official position regarding the nature of the Yuan and Qing dynasties, the Republic of China has published the New History of Yuan, the Draft History of Qing, and the History of Qing; whereas the People's Republic of China has also commissioned its version of the History of Qing.

== See also ==
- Chinese historiography
- Han nationalism
- Han chauvinism
- Conquest dynasty
- New Qing History
- Chinese nationalism
- Five Races Under One Union
- Zhonghua minzu
- Civilization state
- Sinicization
- Ethnic groups in Chinese history
- Names of the Yuan dynasty
- Names of the Qing dynasty
- Legacy of the Qing dynasty
- Northern Yuan
- Later Jin (1616–1636)
- Tibetan sovereignty debate
- Little China (ideology)
