= National symbols of Taiwan =

Taiwan has been ruled by various regimes throughout its history. Since 1945, the island has been ruled by the Republic of China (ROC).

The ROC was the government of mainland China from 1912 to 1949, when this government fled to Taiwan during the Chinese Civil War, and the country today is commonly called Taiwan. The ROC controlled majority parts of China until 1949, but today only controls Taiwan, Penghu, Kinmen, Matsu and nearby smaller islands. However, due to ROC’s past history as the internationally recognized representative of China, plus its current claims over all of China as its territory, some of its official symbols can still be used to represent China under certain contexts.

== Symbols of the Republic of China ==
Symbol	Image	Description
National flag	National flag of the ROC	The flag of the Republic of China was adopted in 1928 and is also known as "Blue Sky, White Sun, and a Wholly Red Earth". It was first used as the flag of Sun Yat-sen's government-in-exile in Tokyo. The flag has not been used in the mainland, except in some museums and historical places, since the ROC government's relocation to Taiwan and the establishment of the People's Republic of China. Because the Taiwanese flag's canton contains the flag of the Kuomintang Party of the Pan-Blue Coalition, supporters of the pro-independence Pan-Green Coalition do not use it.
National flag	The Chinese Taipei Olympic flag	Since the International Olympic Committee recognized the People's Republic of China's Olympic Committee, Taiwan has been barred from using its own flag in the Olympic Games due to requests from the PRC. Instead, it is called Chinese Taipei and uses the Chinese Taipei flag. The flag is white with a blue-white-red bordered plum blossom, inside which the Taiwan's national emblem sits above the Olympic symbol.
National emblem	Blue Sky with a White Sun	The National Emblem was adopted in 1947. Its design is derived from the Blue Sky with a White Sun emblem of the Kuomintang; the only difference between the Taiwan's national emblem and the KMT's is the blue margin outside the points of the star. As this resembles the emblem of the KMT it is disliked by pro-independence factions in Taiwan.
National anthem	"National Anthem of the Republic of China"	The national anthem was adopted informally in 1937 and formally in 1943. The anthem is also known as the San Min-chui (the Three Principles of the People) and was derived from Sun Yat-sen's speech at the inaugural ceremony of the Whampoa Military Academy. It discuses how the nation can achieve stability through the Three Principles. The "National Flag Anthem" was adopted in 1937. The Flag Anthem is also called the "National Banner Song" and is sung when the national flag is raised. Because the Taiwan is barred from using both the Taiwanese flag and anthem in the Olympics under Chinese pressure, the Flag Anthem is used in place of the anthem. The "National Flag Anthem" was heard for the first time in the Olympics when Taiwan (as Chinese Taipei) won a gold medal in the 2004 Summer Olympics.
National Seal	"Seal of the Republic of China" "Seal of Honor"	The Seal of the Republic of China is a governmental seal used for purposes of state. The Seal of Honor is a governmental seal used for purposes of honoring.
Founder of the nation	Sun Yat-sen	Sun Yat-sen (1866–1925) became the first president of the ROC in 1912. He proposed the Three Principles of the People and the Three Phases of National Reconstruction, which served as the foundation of the Northern Expedition. He is highly honored in both Taiwan and China: in Taiwan, presidents take oath in front of Sun's portrait, which is also displayed during National Day celebrations in both Taiwan and China.
Currency	New Taiwan Dollar	
National animal	Formosan black bear (unofficial)	
National bird	Taiwan blue magpie Mikado pheasant	
National tree	Camphor (unofficial)	
National fish	Formosan landlocked salmon	
National flower	Plum blossom	The national flower was officially designated as the plum blossom by the Executive Yuan of the Republic of China on July 21, 1964. The plum blossom, known as the meihua, is symbol for resilience and perseverance in the face of adversity, because plum blossoms often bloom most vibrantly even amidst the harsh winter snow. The triple grouping of stamens represents Dr. Sun Yat-sen's Three Principles of the People, while the five petals symbolize the five branches of the government: Executive Yuan, Legislative Yuan, Judicial Yuan, Examination Yuan and Control Yuan. Unlike other living symbols, the plum blossom is not native to Taiwan.
National year designation/calendar	Minguo calendar	The year 1912 (the first year of the Republic of China following the Xinhai Revolution the previous year) marks the beginning of the Republican (min-guo) calendar. The calendar follows the traditional pattern of the reign year of Chinese emperors, also called the Chinese era name. Once a new government is inaugurated in China, the year resets to 1, i.e. the first year of that era. The year 2025 is the 114th year of the Republican era, so it is min guo 114 nian. Some legislators have suggested abolishing this dating system.
National Founding Day	January 1 ( New Year's Day )	On January 1, 1912 (the first year of the Republic of China), Sun Yat-sen took office as the Provisional President of the Republic of China . He declared the establishment of the Provisional Government of the Republic of China a national anniversary day, and held a flag-raising ceremony in front of the Presidential Palace every year.
National Day	National Day of the Republic of China : October 10	On October 10, 1911, the revolutionaries of the Xinhai Revolution launched the Wuchang Uprising . The Provisional Government of the Republic of China later passed a resolution of the Provisional Senate on September 28, 1912, designating it as the "National Day of the Republic of China."
National Festival	Central Spring and Autumn Festival	The National Revolutionary Martyrs' Shrine is the venue for the central national memorial ceremony. Every year on March 29 and September 3, the President of the Republic of China presides over the ceremony, and the Vice President and the heads of the five branches of government attend the ceremony. It is also a representative place for visiting state guests to pay tribute to the martyrs.

== See also ==
- National symbols of China
- Proposed flags of Taiwan
- Taiwan the Formosa, a proposed national anthem for Taiwan
