= National symbols of China =

This is the current list of the national symbols of China. The People's Republic of China (PRC) controls all of mainland China, while the Republic of China (ROC) controls Taiwan and nearby islands. See National symbols of Taiwan. Both countries used to claim to be the legitimate government of all of China, with Taiwan informally dropping territorial claims in the early nineties.

== Symbols of the People’s Republic of China ==
Symbol		Image	Description
National flag			The national flag of the People's Republic of China was designed by Zeng Liansong. It has a red field charged with five golden stars in the canton. The color red represents the Chinese Communist Revolution, the four smaller stars represent the four social classes in Chinese society, and the largest star represents Chinese unity led by the Chinese Communist Party (CCP). One corner of each of the four smaller stars points towards the center of the bigger star, representing the principle that unity should go around the center. This flag is flown in the mainland, Hong Kong, and Macau.
National emblem			The National Emblem of China includes the Tiananmen Gate, where Mao declared the foundation of the People's Republic of China, in a red circle. Above the Gate are five stars; the largest represents the CCP, while the four smaller stars represent the four social classes. The emblem's outer border contains sheaves of wheat and rice, representing Chinese agricultural workers. At the bottom center is a cog-wheel, representing Chinese industrial workers. The red ribbon represents the unification of the Chinese people.
National Landmark	Great Wall of China		The Great Wall of China is a series of fortified walls stretching across the historical northern borders of China to protect against nomadic tribes of the Eurasian Steppe. It was first built in the 7th century BC, and slowly expanded over time until the Ming Dynasty.
National anthem	"March of the Volunteers"		The national anthem of China is the "March of the Volunteers". Its lyrics were composed by poet and playwright Tian Han in 1934, during the Japanese invasion of Manchuria, and its music was composed by Nie Er.
Founder of the nation	Mao Zedong		Mao Zedong (1893–1976) established the PRC on October 1, 1949, which remains a national holiday. His portrait is displayed on the entrance of Tiananmen Square.
Founder of the nation	Qin Shi-huang		Qin Shi-huang (literally, "First Emperor of Qin") (259 BC - 210 BC) was the founder of the Qin dynasty and then, after the Qin conquered the other Warring States and unified all of China, the first emperor of a unified China. He is widely considered to be the founder of China as a country.
National currency	Renminbi		The renminbi is the official currency of the People's Republic of China. The yuan is its basic unit.
National animal	Giant panda		The national animal of China is the giant panda (Ailuropoda melanolueca), a bear native to south-central China.
National animal	Chinese dragon		The Chinese dragon, or Loong, is one of four auspicious legendary creatures appearing in Chinese mythology and folklore. The dragon has many animal-like body parts, including wolf's head, stag's antlers, hare's eyes, bull's ears, serpent's torso, carp's squama, tiger's limbs and eagle's talons. Theories claim that Loong was a combination of totems of many tribes created to unite them under one banner.
National bird	Red-crowned crane		The red-crowned crane or Manchurian crane (Grus japonensis) is a large East Asian crane and among the rarest cranes in the world. It is found in Siberia (eastern Russia), northeastern China, and the Mongol Daguur Strictly Protected Area in northeastern Mongolia.
National bird	Golden pheasant (unofficial)		The golden pheasant (Chrysolophus pictus) is a game bird of the family Phasianidae. Although it is native to western China, feral populations have been established in the United Kingdom, Canada, the United States, Mexico, Colombia, Peru, Bolivia, Chile, Argentina, Uruguay, the Falkland Islands, Germany, Belgium, the Netherlands, France, Ireland, Australia and New Zealand.
National fruit	Fuzzy kiwifruit		The fuzzy kiwifruit is the national fruit of China. It has fuzzy, dull brown skin and tangy, bright green flesh.
National tree	Ginkgo		Ginkgo (Ginkgo biloba) is the only living species in the division Ginkgophyta, all others being extinct.
National Instrument	Guqin		The guqin (古琴) is a plucked seven-string Chinese musical instrument. It has been played since ancient times, and has traditionally been favoured by scholars and literati as an instrument of great subtlety and refinement.
National sport	Table tennis		Table tennis has been declared by Chairman Mao as a Chinese national sport.
National dish	Peking duck		China's globally recognized national dish is the Peking duck.
National Poet	Li Bai		Li Bai, also known as Li Bo, courtesy name Taibai, art name Qinglian Jushi, was a Chinese poet, acclaimed from his own time to the present as a brilliant and romantic figure who took traditional poetic forms to new heights.
National Philosopher	Confucius		Confucius was a Chinese philosopher and politician of the Spring and Autumn period who is traditionally considered the paragon of Chinese sages. Confucius's teachings and philosophy underpin East Asian culture and society, remaining influential across China and East Asia to this day.
National Calendar	Chinese calendar		The traditional Chinese calendar was developed between 771 and 476 BCE, during the Spring and Autumn period of the Eastern Zhou dynasty.
National Clothing	Cheongsam		Cheongsam and sometimes referred as the mandarin gown, is a Chinese dress worn by women which takes inspiration from the qizhuang, the ethnic clothing of the Manchu people.
National Clothing	Hanfu		Hanfu is the traditional styles of clothing worn by the Han Chinese.
National Drink	Baijiu		Baijiu is a Chinese colourless liquor typically coming in between 35% and 60% alcohol by volume (ABV).
National flower	Paeonia lactiflora		Paeonia lactiflora (Chinese peony, Chinese herbaceous peony, or common garden peony) is a species of herbaceous perennial flowering plant in the family Paeoniaceae, native to central and eastern Asia from eastern Tibet across northern China to eastern Siberia.

== Big Four in China ==
四大	Big Four	List	Reference
四大发明	Big Four Invention	Paper, Compass, Gunpowder, Woodblock printing	Four Great Inventions
四書	Four Books	Great Learning, Doctrine of the Mean, Analects and Mencius	Four Books
四大奇書	Four Great Classical Novels	Water Margin, Romance of the Three Kingdoms, Dream of the Red Chamber and Journey to the West	Classic Chinese Novels
四大美女	Four Great Beauties	Xi Shi, Wang Zhaojun, Diaochan, and Yang Yuhuan	Four Beauties
四大才藝	Four arts	Stringed instrument Guqin, strategy game of Go, Chinese calligraphy, Chinese painting	Four arts
四君子	Four Gentlemen in Painting	Plum blossom, Orchid, Bamboo, and Chrysanthemum	Four Gentlemen
四季名花	Flowers of the Four Seasons	Orchid, Lotus, Chrysanthemum, and Plum blossom	Flowers of the Four Seasons
文房四寶	Four Treasures of the Study	Brush, Ink, Paper, Inkstone	Four Treasures of the Study
四大国粹	Four national treasures	Martial arts, Traditional Chinese medicine, Peking Opera, and Chinese Calligraphy	
四象	Four Guardian	Azure Dragon, Vermilion Bird, White Tiger, and Black Tortoise	Four Symbols
四大神獸	Four Holy Beasts	Azure Dragon, Vermilion Bird, Qilin, and Black Tortoise	Four Holy Beasts
四大名绣	Four Great Chinese embroidery	Suzhou embroidery, Hunan embroidery, Guangdong embroidery and Sichuan embroidery	Chinese embroidery
四大古都	Four Great Ancient Capitals	Beijing, Xi’an, Luoyang, Nanjing	Historical capitals of China
四大名楼	Four Great Towers of China	Yellow Crane Tower, Pavilion of Prince Teng, Yueyang Tower, Penglai Pagoda	Four Great Towers of China
四大名山	Four Great Mountains of Buddhism	Mount Wutai, Mount Emei, Mount Jiuhua, Mount Putuo	Sacred Mountains of China
四大节日	Four Great Traditional Chinese Festivals	Spring Festival (Chinese New Year), the Dragon Boat Festival, the Mid-Autumn Festival and the Qingming Festival	List of observances set by the Chinese calendar
四大名園	Four Great Gardens	Humble Administrator's Garden, Summer Palace, Chengde Mountain Resort, Lingering Garden	中国四大名园
四大民俗	Four Great folklore	The Butterfly Lovers, The Legend of the White Snake, Lady Meng Jiang and The Cowherd and the Weaver Girl	Chinese folklore
四大名剧	Four Great Plays	Romance of the Western Chamber, The Peony Pavilion, The Peach Blossom Fan, The Palace of Eternal Youth	四大名剧
四大菜系	Four Great Traditions of Chinese Cuisine	Chuan (Sichuan), Lu (Shandong), Yue (Guangdong), Huaiyang (Jiangsu)	Four Great Traditions
四大石窟	Four Great Grottoes	Maijishan Grottoes, Mogao Caves, Longmen Grottoes, Yungang Grottoes	

== See also ==
- National symbols of Taiwan
- National flower of China
- National bird of China
