= Liberate Hong Kong (video game) =

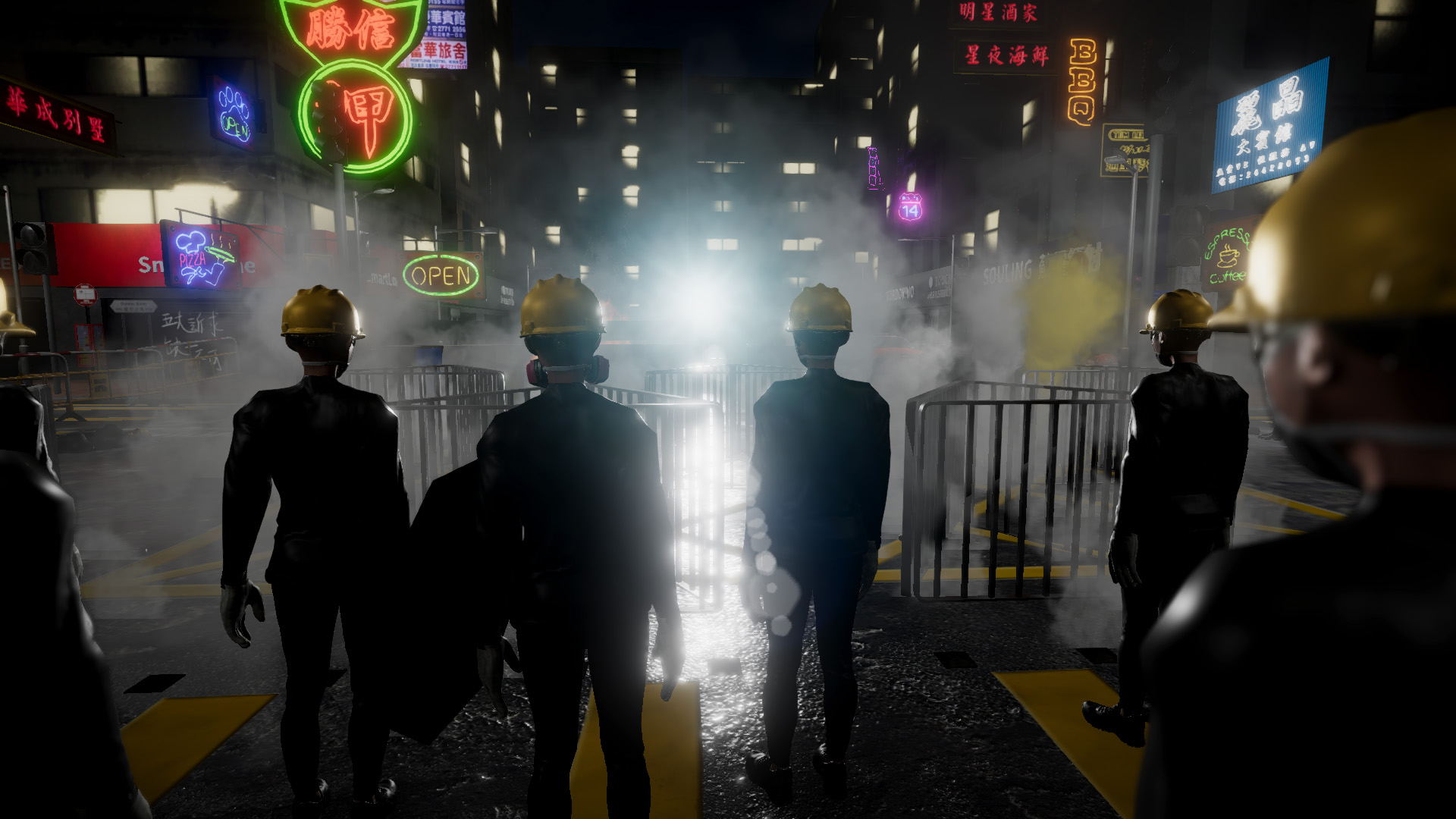
- Developer: Hong Kong Protesters 2019
- Engine: Unity
- Platforms: Microsoft Windows, macOS
- Release: November 20, 2019
- Genre: Simulation
- Mode: Single-player

Liberate Hong Kong is a simulation video game developed by Hong Kong-based activists during the 2019–2020 Hong Kong protests. The game simulates a protest environment in Hong Kong, and the protagonist is an unarmed and unnamed protester.

The game was released for Microsoft Windows and Mac OS in November 2019, and supports virtual reality devices such as Oculus Rift and HTC Vive.

== Gameplay ==
Played from first-person perspective, police attack the protesters with a variety of weapons, but the protesters, being completely unarmed, cannot return fire. Playing as one of the protesters, the player must dodge police attacks and keep protesting without getting arrested. The game does not end until the player gets arrested or shot by the police.

== Development ==
Liberate Hong Kong was developed by a group of activists in under a week and takes approximately 10 minutes to play. The developers recorded chants heard and spray-painted text seen on the streets of Hong Kong.

== Reception ==
South China Morning Post's Abacus described that the developers see it as part of the protest movement while then game has limited gameplay elements. Agence France-Presse analyzed that the player cannot engage in violent actions, instead discarding incoming projectiles like tear gas rounds. It was livestreamed by Hearthstone streamer Blitzchung, the subject of the Blitzchung controversy in October 2019. In December 2019, the developers wrote an open letter to game distribution service Steam, accusing the storefront of censoring the game.

In China, an anti-protestor game called Everyone Hit the Traitors was made in response, in which players could beat up protestors and their financial and political backers, such as Joshua Wong, Martin Lee, and Jimmy Lai.
