= Golden age (metaphor) =

Period when great tasks were accomplished

A golden age is a period considered the peak in the history of a country or people, a time period when the greatest achievements were made. The term originated from early Greek and Roman poets, who used it to refer to a time when mankind lived in a better time and was pure (see Golden Age).

The ancient Greek poet Hesiod introduced the term in his Works and Days, when referring to the period when the "Golden Race" of man lived. This was part of fivefold division of Ages of Man, starting with the Golden age, then the Silver Age, the Bronze Age, the Age of Heroes (including the Trojan War), and finally, the current Iron Age. The concept was further refined by Ovid, in his Metamorphoses, into the four "metal ages" (golden, silver, bronze, and iron).

== The Golden age in Classic literature ==
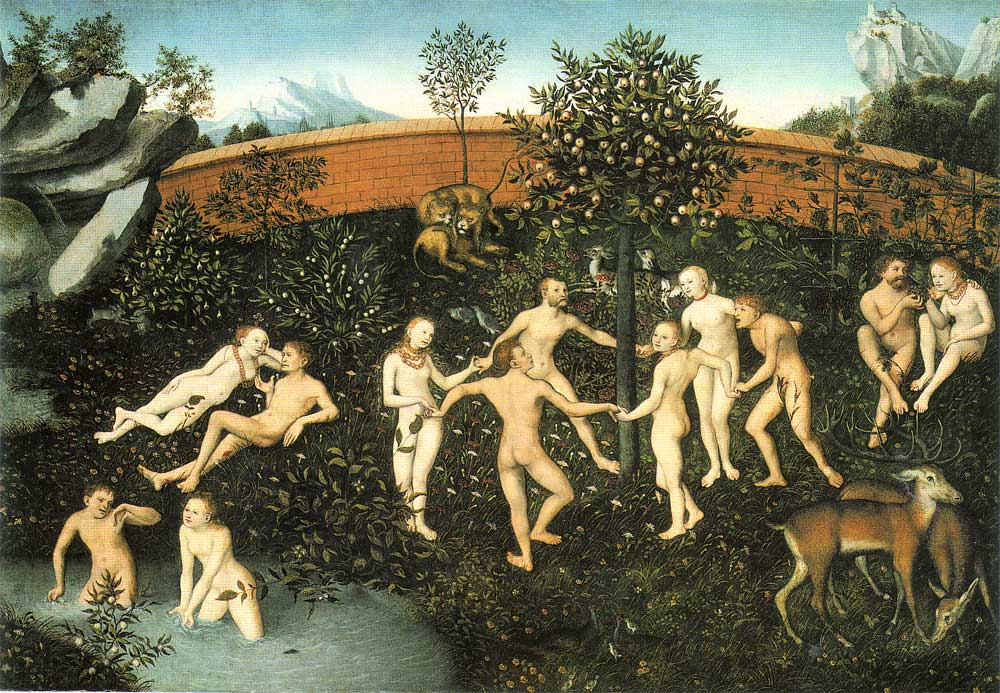
The Golden Age by Lucas Cranach the Elder, 1530

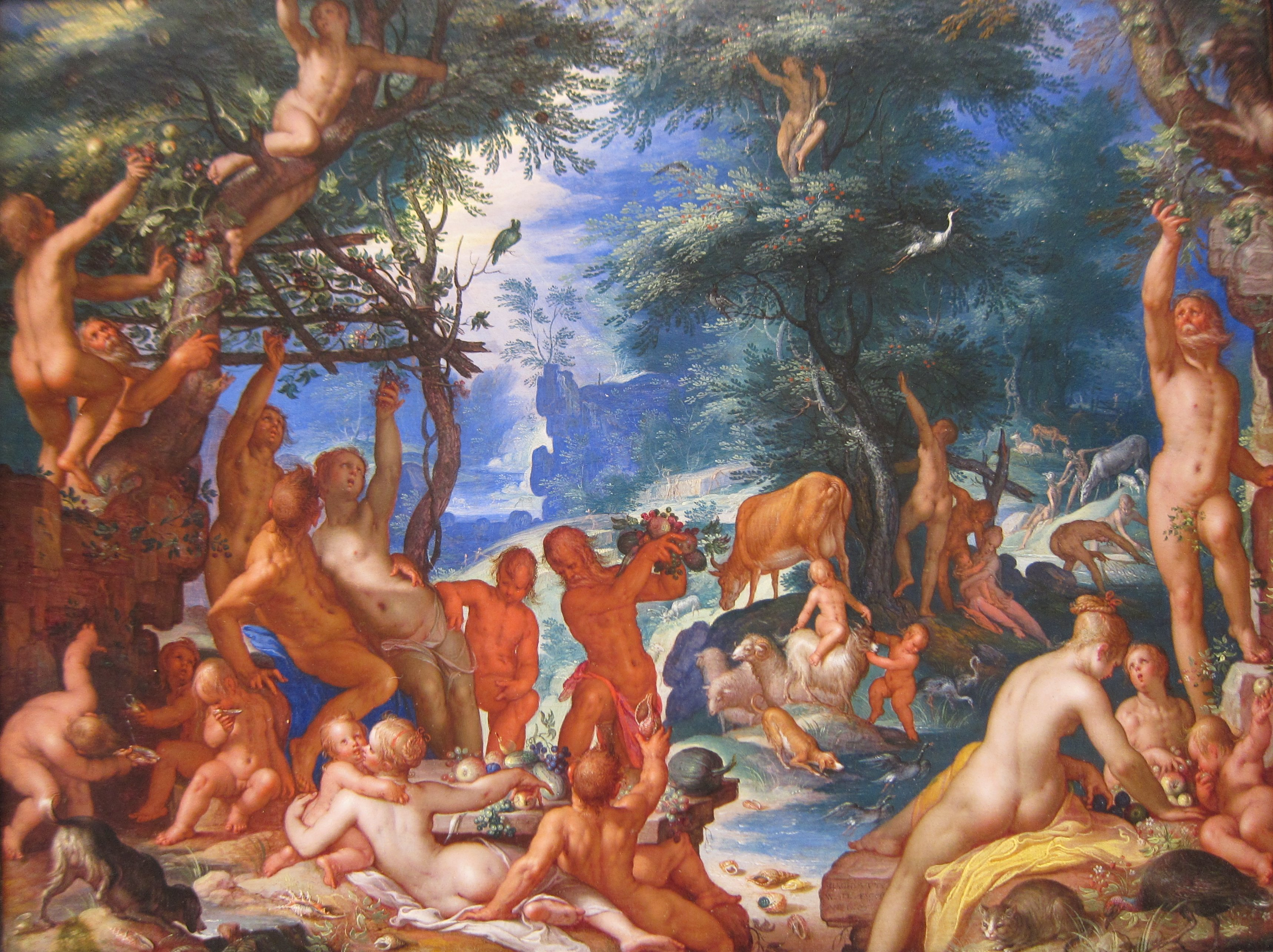
The Golden Age by Joachim Wtewael, 1605

The Golden age as described by Hesiod was an age where all humans were created directly by the Olympian gods. They lived long lives in peace and harmony, and were oblivious of death. The "Golden race" were however mortals, but would die peacefully and in their sleep unmarked by sickness and age. Ovid emphasizes the justice and peace that defined the Golden Age. He described it as a time before man learned the art of navigation, and as a pre-agricultural society. The idea of a Golden age lingered in literature and historical understanding throughout the Greek and Roman periods. It was partly replaced by the Christian Six Ages of the World based on the biblical chronology in the early Middle Ages.

== Evolution from period to metaphor ==
The term "Golden age" has always had a metaphoric element. A few centuries after Hesiod, Plato pointed out that the "Golden race" were not made from gold as such, but that the term should be understood metaphorically. The classical idea of the "metal ages" as actual historical periods held sway throughout the Greek and Roman periods. While supplemented by St. Augustine's "Six Ages of the World", the classical ideas were never entirely eradicated, and it resurfaced to form the basis of division of time in early archaeology.

At the birth of modern archaeology in the 18th century, the "Golden age" was associated with a pre-agricultural society. However, already in the 16th century, the term "Golden age" was replaced by "Stone Age" in the three-age system. Still, Rousseau used the term for a loosely defined historical period characterized by the "State of nature" as late as the late 18th century. While the concept of an Iron and Bronze Age are still used by historians and archaeologists, the "Golden age" of Hesiod was a purely mythical period, and has come to signify any period in history where the state of affairs for a specific phenomenon appear to have been on their height, better than in the periods preceding it and following the "Golden Age". It is sometimes still employed for the hunter-gatherer tribal societies of the Mesolithic, but only as a metaphor.

== Golden Age in society timeline ==
A society's Golden Age marks that period in its history having a heightened output of art, science, literature, and philosophy.

=== Africa ===
- The fourteenth and fifteenth centuries have been described as a golden age of trans-Saharan trade.

=== Asia ===
- Golden Ages of India (The "Golden Age of India" is typically referred to the flourishing period of the Gupta Empire).
  - Gupta Empire during which Indians made remarkable achievements in mathematics, science, culture, religion, philosophy, and astronomy.
- Golden Ages of China (The "Chinese Golden Age" is used to refer to the period of the Tang and Song Dynasties from 618 to 1279, which saw an economic revolution).
  - Han dynasty, especially the Rule of Wen and Jing, the Zhao-Xuan Resurgence, and the Rule of Ming and Zhang, marked by significant economic prosperity, geopolitical prominence and expansion of overland trade routes into the Western Regions, such as the Silk Road.
  - Tang dynasty, especially the Zhenguan and Kaiyuan era, marked by significant advancements in technology and medicine, arts, poetry and civil service selection system, as well as numerous military successes in Northeast Asia, Inner Asia, Tibetan Plateau and Southeast Asia.
  - Song dynasty, particularly the Northern Song dynasty, where China was the economic superpower of the world, becoming the first nation in history to issue standardized paper money, and had significant advancements in culture, lyric poetry and science and technology.
  - Ming dynasty, notably under the three generations of Yongle, Hongxi and Xuande Emperors (the latter two collectively known as the Reign of Ren and Xuan), which saw the construction of the Forbidden City, the sponsorship of treasure voyages and establishment of maritime trade networks, as well as advancements in culture, literature and poetry, arts, music, and military successes against the Northern Yuan, Hồ Vietnam and Azuchi–Momoyama Japan.
  - Qing dynasty (specifically early High Qing) where China became the world's largest economy and most populous nation. Furthermore, the Qing dynasty is the fourth largest empire in history.
- Islamic Golden Age in which Islamic scientific achievements spanned a wide range of subject areas including medicine, mathematics, astronomy, agriculture, physics, economics, engineering and optics.
- Golden age of Myanmar from the 1050s and 1060s under King Anawrahta until the Mongol invasions of the 1280s during the Pagan dynasty where significant advancements were made in architectural engineering.
- Golden age of Khmer civilization during the 12th and 13th centuries, when Angkor Wat was constructed, medieval Cambodia was at its territorial peak, and Hindu-Buddhist culture flourished in mainland Southeast Asia.
- Golden Age in Indonesian history from about 1293 to around 1500 when the Hindu–Buddhist Majapahit kingdom in eastern Java, under Gajah Mada, extended its influence to much of southern Malay Peninsula, Borneo, Sumatra, and Bali.

=== Europe ===
- Athenian Golden Age presided by Pericles.
- Byzantine Empire under the Macedonian dynasty (867–1056), has been dubbed the "Golden Age" of Byzantium.
- Georgian Golden Age, the period of prosperity and cultural flourishing in the Kingdom of Georgia in the 11th, 12th, and early 13th centuries, especially under Queen Tamar the Great.
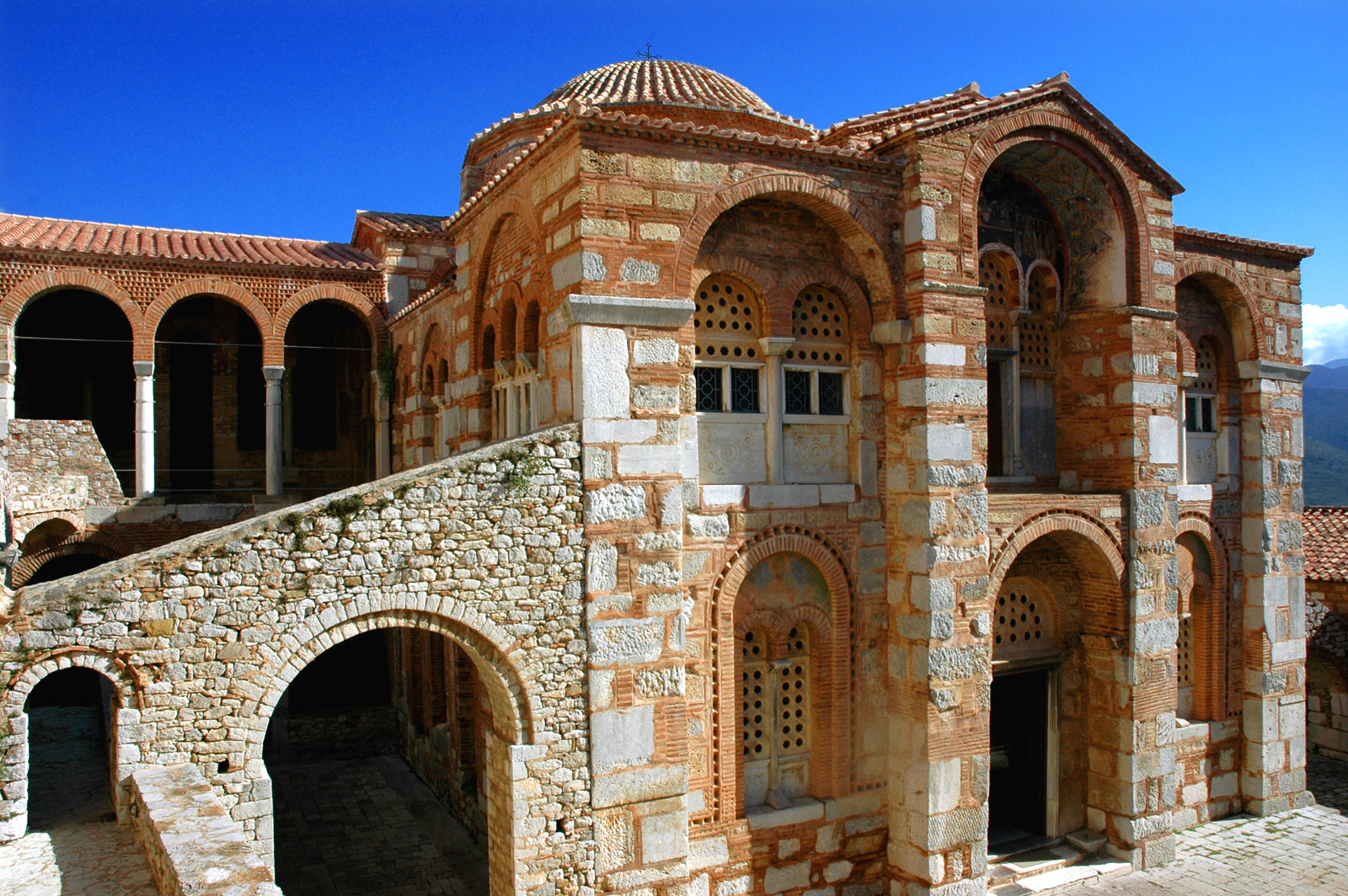
  The Macedonian era is often cited as the Golden Age of Byzantium.
- Golden Age of Bulgaria, a golden age in Bulgaria during the First Bulgarian Empire period.
- Golden age of Jewish culture in the Iberian Peninsula, the period between 900 and 1100. Jews held high positions alongside with philosophy, medicine, and Hebrew poetry prospering. Sometimes categorized as part of the larger Islamic Golden Age, because of the event's timeframe and geography.
- Kievan Rus' underwent a golden age during the 10th century.
- Polish Golden Age, from the 14th century to the end of 17th century. Polish culture blossomed alongside the Polish Renassiance.
- Portuguese Golden Age, 15th century – 1580. Possibly the European power of the time most proficient in sailing. (Note: See also: Portuguese Renaissance)
- The Spanish Golden Age (siglo de oro) corresponds to the reign of the Catholic Monarchs and of the Habsburgs between 1492 and 1659, a period marked by a powerful Spanish Empire and by the flourishing of the arts.
- The High Renaissance of the 16th century is often described as the "golden age" of the culture and art of Renaissance Italy.
- Golden age of Belarusian history, 1500s–1570s, especially in the 1550s–1570s.
- The history of Malta under the Order of Saint John (1530–1798) is generally considered as a "golden age" of architecture, the arts, health and education, especially between the late 1560s and the early 1770s.
- Dutch Golden Age, 17th century, approximately 1588–1672.
  - Golden Age of Dutch Painting, spanning the 17th century.
- The Belle Époque is considered France's golden age as it was a time when culture, science, and living standards reached their peak.
- The Elizabethan era (the reign of Elizabeth I, 1558–1603) has been described as England's golden age.
- Danish Golden Age, first half of the 19th century.
- Golden Age of Russian Poetry, first half of the 19th century, with Russian poets Pushkin, Lermontov, Tyutchev, and others.
- The Golden Twenties (goldene zwanziger) in Germany during the 1920s.

=== North America ===
- The Golden Age of Piracy took place primarily within the Caribbean, 1650–1730.
- Golden Age of Capitalism, a period of rapid growth in the economies of the west, and Japan, from 1945 to 1970. Also used for the Gilded Age of the late 19th century.

== Culture and technology ==
A golden age is often ascribed to the years immediately following a technological innovation that allows new forms of expression and new ideas. Examples include:

- Golden age of Latin literature, the period in Latin literature between Cicero and Ovid.
- Golden age of Christian monasticism, 8th–12th centuries, its peak being 11th century to early-mid 12th century. Understood to be a golden age in the European continent of strictly religious matters, and not in comparison to other golden ages of the era.
- Golden age of Valencian literature, 15th century.
- Golden age of chocolate, 1850–1900
- Golden age of illustration, 1880s–1910s
- Golden age of board games, 1880s–1920s or 2000-present
- The Golden Age of the Piano, roughly the end of the 19th century and beginning of the 20th
- The Golden Age of Radio, 1920s–1940s
- The Golden Age of American animation, between 1928 (sound) and the 1960s (television).
- The Golden Age of Hollywood, which lasted from the end of the silent era in American cinema in the late 1920s to the 1960s
- The Golden Age of Argentine cinema, from the 1930s to the 1950s
- Golden Age of Television (referring to U.S. television circa 1950s) when television was still a fairly recent invention. Programs such as Kraft Television Theatre, Playhouse 90, and later Alfred Hitchcock Presents and The Twilight Zone brought a level of writing to American commercial television that would rarely be seen in the next several decades.
- Golden age of Gameshows, late 50s to early 60s
- Golden Age of Muscle Cars, 1964–1972.
- Golden Age of Pornography, refers to a 15-year period (around 1969–1984) in commercial American pornography, which spread internationally, in which sexually-explicit films gained positive attention from mainstream cinemas, movie critics, and the general public. It began with release of the 1969 film Blue Movie directed by Andy Warhol, and the 1970 film Mona produced by Bill Osco. Those were the first adult erotic films, depicting explicit sex, to receive wide theatrical release in the United States. During that period, pornographic films emerged from underground studios, and became a full-scale industry with aspirations to become part of mainstream cinema.
- Golden age of arcade video games, late 1970s–1980s
- The 1980s professional wrestling boom is referred the "Golden Age" or "Golden Era" of pro wrestling.
- Golden Era of Spanish Software, 1983–1992
- The Golden Age of radio-controlled buggies, 1983–1992. A period when model companies shifted towards practical electric-powered buggies, leading to numerous companies (including toy manufacturers) entering the market and helping it to become the dominant class.
- Golden age of hip hop, mid 1980s–mid 1990s a period when hip-hop music was arguably at its creative and artistic peak
- Golden age of Manga, 1980s–1990s
- Second Golden Age of Television, 1999–2023, a period of high-quality and often scripted American television programming that started with The Sopranos, The Wire, Breaking Bad, and Mad Men (among others) and ended with the 2023 Hollywood labor disputes and streaming wars
- Golden age of race queens had enjoyed two eras; the first was the swimsuit clad race queen bubble of the late 1980s to late 1990s and the miniskirted second golden age of race queen of the 2000s, when the influx of models came with the ability to draw the same as or bigger popularity than some of the drivers competing in the events.

At least one technology had its "Golden Age" in its latter years:

- The Golden Age of Sail, 16th-19th centuries.

A cultural "golden age" can feature in the construction of a national myth.

== Genres ==
Technology and creativity spawn new genres or new surges in the production of literature and the arts. The onset (or dominance or heyday) of a new genre/movement, in popular parlance, becomes its "Golden Age". For example:

- Golden age of Swordplay, period of sword skills from the 16th to the 18th centuries
- Golden Age of Broadway, the period from about 1943 to 1968 that brought musicals like Oklahoma! (1943); Kiss Me, Kate (1948); West Side Story (1957); The Sound of Music (1959); and Hello, Dolly! (1964) to the Broadway stage
- Golden Age of British dance bands, 1920s–1930s
- Golden Age of the British whodunit, early 20th-century
- Golden Age of Comic Books, period between roughly 1938 and 1945, though exact definitions vary
- Golden Age of Mexican cinema, beginning in 1935 and ending in the late 1950s
- Golden Age of Science Fiction, period from the late 1930s through the 1950s
- Golden Age of the Western period of movies from the 1930s–1960s
- Golden Age of Disney Animation, the period from 1937 to 1942, that brought the films Snow White and the Seven Dwarfs (1937); Pinocchio (1940), Fantasia (1940), Dumbo (1941), and Bambi (1942)
- Golden Age of Detective Fiction, an era of detective fiction between World Wars I and II, epitomised by Agatha Christie
- Golden age of the Italian horror movie (c. 1957–1979)
- Golden age of Japanese cinema, 1950s
- The golden age of fast food buffets, 1980s to the early 1990s
- Golden Age of romantic comedies, 1990s
- Golden age of Japanese horror, 1999 to 2005
- The golden age of console RPGs, 1990s to early 2000s

== Science ==
- Golden age of cosmology (1992–present)
- Golden age of general relativity, upon its entering the mainstream of theoretical physics, 1960–1975.
- Golden age of physics (19th century) with modern physics (quantum mechanics and the theory of relativity)

== Senior citizens ==
Some companies use "Golden Age" as a marketing euphemism for "senior citizen", itself a euphemism for "old person".

- Golden Age Passport, a National Park Service pass for citizens who are 62 or older.

== Sport ==
- The golden age of alpinism (1854–1865), during which many major Alpine peaks saw their first ascents.
- The Golden Age of cricket (1890–1914)
- Golden age of baseball (1920–1960)
- Golden age of American soccer (1921–1931)
- Golden age of land speed record (1920s–1939)
- Golden age of Grand Prix racing (1934–1939)
- Golden Age of Roller Skating (1937–1959)
- Golden age of Bowling (1940s–1970s)
- Golden Age of American Football (1950s–1960s)
- Golden Age of Trans-Am Series (1968–1972)
- Golden age of NASCAR (1972–2003)
- Golden age of rallying (1983–1986), when loosened design rules produced powerful cars and a peak of popularity.
- Golden age of touring car racing (1993–1999)
- Golden Age of Bodybuilding (1960-1983)

== See also ==
- Bronze Age (disambiguation)
- Gilded Age – Era of US history from the 1870s to the late 1890s
- Heroic Age (disambiguation)
- Silver age (disambiguation)
- Utopia – Imaginary community with desirable qualities
