= Golden ages of China =

Prosperous eras in the history of China

Throughout Chinese history, China had multiple periods of golden age. In Chinese historiography, golden ages on a large scale are known as shèngshì (盛世, lit. Prosperous Era), while golden ages on a smaller scale are termed as zhìshì (治世, lit. Well-Governed Era).

== List of Chinese golden ages ==
This is a list of the golden ages in the history of China, sorted by dynasty.

Golden age	Presided by	Period	Description
Shang dynasty
Resurgence of Pan Geng 盤庚中興	Pan Geng	1300–1292 BCE	Social stability following the relocation of the Shang capital to Yin.
Rule of Wu Ding 武丁之治	Wu Ding	1250–1190 BCE	Peak of the Shang dynasty.
Zhou dynasty
Rule of Cheng and Kang 成康之治	King Cheng of Zhou King Kang of Zhou	1043–1005 BCE	Quelling of the Rebellion of the Three Guards and institution of the fengjian system.
Resurgence of King Xuan 宣王中興	King Xuan of Zhou	828–797 BCE	Recovery of the society following the tyrannical rule of the King Li of Zhou.
Han dynasty
Rule of Wen and Jing 文景之治	Emperor Wen of Han Emperor Jing of Han	180–141 BCE	Economic prosperity, reduction of vassal autonomy after Rebellion of the Seven States, laid logistic foundation for the subsequent war against the Xiongnu.
Golden Age of the Emperor Wu of Han 漢武盛世	Emperor Wu of Han	141–87 BCE	Centralization of imperial power and rise of Confucian doctrines, pacification of the Xiongnu, expansion of influence and contacts into the Western Regions, Korean Peninsula, Lingnan region and northern Vietnam, establishment of the early Silk Road.
Rule of Zhao and Xuan 昭宣之治	Emperor Zhao of Han Emperor Xuan of Han	87–49 BCE	Social stabilization and economic recovery following the Han–Xiongnu War, and establishment of the Protectorate of the Western Regions. Peak of the Western Han.
Guangwu Restoration 光武中興	Emperor Guangwu of Han	25–57 CE	Restoration of the Han dynasty following a 16-year interregnum by the usurping Xin dynasty.
Rule of Ming and Zhang 明章之治	Emperor Ming of Han Emperor Zhang of Han	57–88 CE	Submission of the Southern Xiongnu.
Prosperity of Yongyuan 永元之隆	Emperor He of Han	92–105 CE	Destruction of the Northern Xiongnu. Peak of the Eastern Han.
Jin dynasty
Reign of Taikang 太康之治	Emperor Wu of Jin	280–289 CE	Reunification of China following the conquest of the Eastern Wu, and economic recovery.
Liu Song
Reign of Yuanjia 元嘉之治	Emperor Wen of Liu Song	424–450 CE	Peace and stability as a result of good governance and reforms.
Northern Wei
Reforms of Xiaowen 孝文改革	Emperor Xiaowen of Northern Wei	471–499 CE	Political and cultural development following the policy of Sinicization.
Southern Qi
Reign of Yongming 永明之治	Emperor Wu of Southern Qi	482–493 CE	Establishment of peaceful relations with the Northern Wei, promotion of domestic education, and good management of the bureaucracy.
Liang dynasty
Reign of Tianjian 天監之治	Emperor Wu of Liang	464–549 CE	Peace and stability.
Chen dynasty
Reign of Tianjia 天嘉之治	Emperor Wen of Chen	559–566 CE	Economic recovery and prosperity following the rebellion of Hou Jing.
Sui dynasty
Reign of Kaihuang 開皇之治	Emperor Wen of Sui	581–604 CE	Establishment of the Sui dynasty. Political stability and economic prosperity.
Tang dynasty
Reign of Wude 武德之治	Emperor Gaozu of Tang	618–626 CE	Establishment of the Tang dynasty. Political stability and economic prosperity.
Reign of Zhenguan 貞觀之治	Emperor Taizong of Tang	626–649 CE	Good governance, development of culture and production, and strengthening of territorial boundaries.
Reign of Yonghui 永徽之治	Emperor Gaozong of Tang	649–683 CE	Continuation of policies introduced by the Emperor Taizong of Tang. Territorial height of the Tang dynasty.
Reign of Kaiyuan 開元盛世	Emperor Xuanzong of Tang	712–741 CE	Peak of the Tang dynasty.
Yuanhe Resurgence 元和中興	Emperor Xianzong of Tang	805–820 CE	Stability following the An Lushan Rebellion.
Huichang Resurgence 會昌中興	Emperor Wuzong of Tang	840–846 CE	Increase in government revenue, and consolidation of imperial influence.
Reign of Dazhong 大中之治	Emperor Xuanzong of Tang	846–859 CE	Domestic stability, and restoration of control over the Guiyi Circuit.
Wu Zhou
Continuation of the Order of Zhenguan 貞觀遺風	Wu Zhao	690–705 CE	Continuation of the policies introduced during the Reign of Zhenguan.
Song dynasty
Reign of Jianlong 建隆之治	Emperor Taizu of Song	960–976 CE	Establishment of the Song dynasty, and conquest of the remaining Ten Kingdoms with the exception of the Northern Han.
Reign of Xianping 咸平之治	Emperor Zhenzong of Song	997–1022 CE	Conclusion of the Chanyuan Treaty which heralded the start of a century-long peace with the Liao dynasty.
Prosperous Rule of the Emperor Renzong of Song 仁宗盛治	Emperor Renzong of Song	1022–1063 CE	Peak of the Song dynasty.
Reign of Qianchun 乾淳之治	Emperor Xiaozong of Song	1162–1189 CE	Conclusion of the Longxing Peace Accord which heralded the start of a 40-year-long peace with the Jin dynasty.
Liao dynasty
Resurgence of the Emperor Jingzong of Liao 景宗中興	Emperor Jingzong of Liao	969–982 CE	Stability and prosperity following the policy of Sinicization.
Reign of Taiping 太平之治	Emperor Shengzong of Liao	1021–1031 CE	Peak of the Liao dynasty.
Western Xia
Rule of Chong and Ren 崇仁之治	Emperor Chongzong of Western Xia Emperor Renzong of Western Xia	1086–1193 CE	Peak of the Western Xia.
Jin dynasty
Prosperous Age of Dading 大定盛世	Emperor Shizong of Jin	1161–1189 CE	Conclusion of the Longxing Peace Accord which heralded the start of a 40-year-long peace with the Song dynasty, increase in government revenue, and good governance.
Reign of Mingchang 明昌之治	Emperor Zhangzong of Jin	1189–1208 CE	Peak of the Jin dynasty; the Jin dynasty was the most powerful and prosperous state in East Asia during the time.
Yuan dynasty
Prosperous Age of Zhiyuan 至元盛世	Emperor Shizu of Yuan	1271–1294 CE	Unification of China under the Yuan dynasty, and political and economic reforms.
Prosperous Age of Dade 大德盛世	Emperor Chengzong of Yuan	1295–1307 CE	Domestic stability, reduction of taxation, economic growth, and institutionalization of Confucianism in the government.
Ming dynasty
Reign of Hongwu 洪武之治	Hongwu Emperor	1368–1398 CE	Establishment of the Ming dynasty.
Prosperous Age of Yongle 永樂盛世	Yongle Emperor	1402–1424 CE	Military campaigns against the Mongols, establishment of Chinese rule in Vietnam, and commissioning of six large-scale maritime expeditions.
Reign of Ren and Xuan 仁宣之治	Hongxi Emperor Xuande Emperor	1424–1435 CE	Peak of the Ming dynasty.
New Order of Chenghua 成化新風	Chenghua Emperor	1464–1487 CE	Good governance, liberal political policies, economic prosperity, and domestic stability.
Hongzhi Resurgence 弘治中興	Hongzhi Emperor	1487–1505 CE	Economic prosperity, and domestic stability.
New Governance of Longqing 隆慶新政	Longqing Emperor	1567–1572 CE	Normalization of relations with foreign adversaries, and introduction of a series of new domestic policies.
Wanli Resurgence 萬曆中興	Wanli Emperor	1573–1582 CE	Implementation of reforms led by Zhang Juzheng, domestic stability, and increase in government revenue.
Qing dynasty
High Qing era 康雍乾盛世	Kangxi Emperor Yongzheng Emperor Qianlong Emperor	1662–1799 CE	Peak of the Qing dynasty.

== See also ==
- Chinese Century
- History of China
- Pax Sinica
- Tributary system of China
