= Age of Bronze =

Age of Bronze may refer to:

- Age of Bronze (comics), a comics series by Eric Shanower
- One of the Ages of Man, according to classical mythology
- Bronze Age, an archaeological era
- The Age of Bronze, an 1823 poem by Lord Byron
- A sculpture by Auguste Rodin
- A children's novel in the series Pirates of the Caribbean: Jack Sparrow

== See also ==
- Copper Age
- Age (disambiguation)
- Bronze (disambiguation)
- Bronze Age (disambiguation)
