= History of general relativity =

Origins of Einstein's gravitation theory

General relativity is a theory of gravitation that was developed by Albert Einstein between 1907 and 1915, with contributions by many others after 1915. According to general relativity, the observed gravitational attraction between masses results from the warping of space and time by those masses.

Before the advent of general relativity, Newton's law of universal gravitation had been accepted for more than two hundred years as a valid description of the gravitational force between masses, even though Newton himself did not regard the theory as the final word on the nature of gravity. Within a century of Newton's formulation, careful astronomical observation revealed unexplainable differences between the theory and the observations. Under Newton's model, gravity was the result of an attractive force between massive objects. Although even Newton was bothered by the unknown nature of that force, the basic framework was extremely successful at describing motion.

However, experiments and observations show that Einstein's description accounts for several effects that are unexplained by Newton's law, such as minute anomalies in the orbits of Mercury and other planets. General relativity also predicts novel effects of gravity, such as gravitational waves, gravitational lensing and an effect of gravity on time known as gravitational time dilation. Many of these predictions have been confirmed by experiment or observation, while others are the subject of ongoing research.

General relativity has developed into an essential tool in modern astrophysics. It provides the foundation for the current understanding of black holes, regions of space where gravitational attraction is so strong that not even light can escape. Their strong gravity is thought to be responsible for the intense radiation emitted by certain types of astronomical objects (such as active galactic nuclei or microquasars). General relativity is also part of the framework of the standard Big Bang model of cosmology.

== Creation of general relativity ==
=== Early investigations ===
The first relativistic theory of gravity was proposed by Henri Poincaré in 1905. He published a Lorentz invariant theory on four-dimensional spacetime, where gravity is transmitted by gravitational waves that travel at the speed of light.

As Einstein later said, the reason for the development of general relativity was the preference of inertial motion within special relativity, while a theory which from the outset prefers no particular state of motion appeared more satisfactory to him. So, while still working at the patent office in 1907, Einstein had what he would call his "happiest thought". He realized that the principle of relativity could be extended to gravitational fields.

Consequently, in 1907 he wrote an article, published in 1908, on acceleration under special relativity. In that article, he argued that free fall is really inertial motion, and that for a freefalling observer the rules of special relativity must apply. This argument is called the equivalence principle. In the same article, Einstein also predicted the phenomenon of gravitational time dilation.

In 1911, Einstein published another article expanding on the 1907 article. There, he considered the case of a uniformly accelerated box not in a gravitational field, and noted that it would be indistinguishable from a box sitting still in an unchanging gravitational field. He used special relativity to show that clocks at the top of a box accelerating upward would run faster than clocks at the bottom. He concluded that the rate at which time passes depends on the position in a gravitational field, and that the difference in rate is proportional to the gravitational potential to a first approximation.

The article also predicted the deflection of light by massive bodies, such as Jupiter or the Sun. Although the approximation was crude, it allowed him to calculate that the deflection is nonzero. Einstein urged astronomers to attempt direct observation of light deflection of fixed stars near the Sun during solar eclipses when they would be visible. German astronomer Erwin Finlay-Freundlich publicized Einstein's challenge to scientists around the world.

In October 1911, Freundlich contacted astronomer Charles D. Perrine in Berlin to inquire as to the suitability of examining existing solar eclipse photographs to prove Einstein's prediction of light deflection. Perrine, the director of the Argentine National Observatory at Cordoba, had participated in four solar eclipse expeditions while at the Lick Observatory, in 1900, 1901, 1905, and 1908. "...he had become, in the opinion of the director of the Lick Observatory, W. W. Campbell, an observer without peer in the field of solar eclipses." He did not believe existing eclipse photos would be useful in proving Einstein's claim. In 1912 Freundlich asked if Perrine would include observation of light deflection as part of his program for the solar eclipse of October 10, 1912, in Brazil. W. W. Campbell, director of the Lick Observatory, loaned Perrine a long-focus, narrow-field camera lense, called an intramercurial lense. Perrine and the Cordoba team were the only eclipse expedition to construct specialized equipment dedicated to observing light deflection. However, all the expeditions experienced heavy rain which prevented any observations. Nevertheless, Perrine was the first astronomer to make a dedicated attempt to observe light deflection to test Einstein's prediction.

Two years later, the three observatory directors, Perrine, Freundlich, and Campbell included light deflection in their expeditions to the Russian Empire for the solar eclipse of August 21, 1914. However, due to clouds and the outbreak of World War I, no results were possible. However, Perrine was able to take the first photographs in an attempt to verify Einstein's prediction of light deflection. A light cloud cover prevented determining accurate star positions.

In hindsight, the occluding weather and lack of results in 1912 and 1914 favored Einstein. If clear photographs and measurable results had been possible, Einstein's 1911 prediction might have been proven wrong. The amount of deflection that he calculated in 1911 was too small (0.83 seconds of arc) by a factor of two because the approximation he used does not work well for things moving at near the speed of light. When Einstein completed the full theory of general relativity in 1915, he rectified this error and predicted the correct amount of light deflection caused by the Sun (1.75 seconds of arc). Eddington and Dyson in 1919 and W. W. Campbell in 1922 were able to compare their results to Einstein's corrected prediction.

Another of Einstein's notable thought experiments about the nature of the gravitational field is that of a rotating disk (a variant of the Ehrenfest paradox). He imagined an observer performing experiments on a rotating turntable. He noted that such an observer would find the ratio of the circumference of a circle to its radius greater than $2\pi$ expected from Euclidean geometry. The reason is that the radius of a circle would be measured with an uncontracted ruler, but, according to special relativity, the circumference would seem to be longer because the ruler would be contracted. Since Einstein believed that the laws of physics were local, described by local fields, he concluded from this that spacetime could be locally curved. This led him to study Riemannian geometry, and to formulate general relativity in this language.

=== Developing general relativity ===
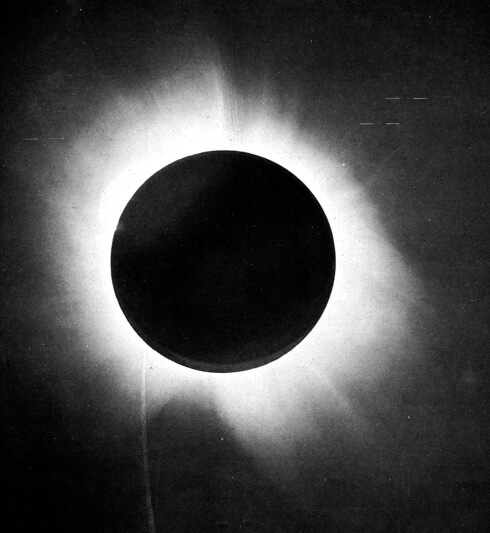
Eddington's photograph of a solar eclipse, which confirmed Einstein's theory that light "bends".

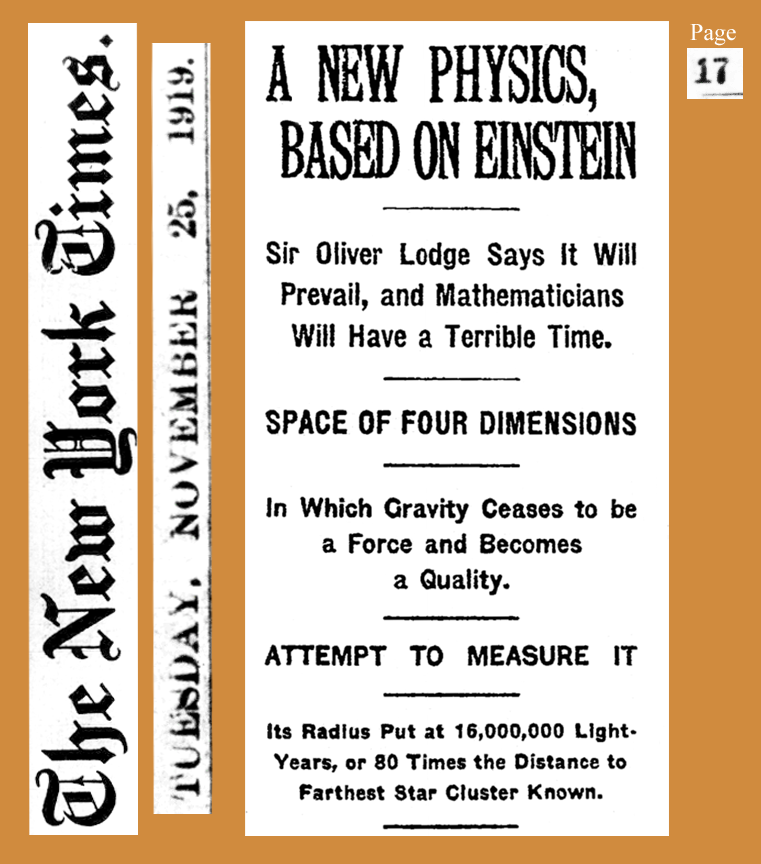
The New York Times reported confirmation of "the Einstein theory" (specifically, the bending of light by gravitation) based on 29 May 1919 eclipse observations in Principe (Africa) and Sobral (Brazil), after the findings were presented on 6 November 1919 to a joint meeting in London of the Royal Society and the Royal Astronomical Society. (Full text)

In 1912, Einstein returned to Switzerland to accept a professorship at his alma mater, ETH Zurich. Once back in Zurich, he immediately visited his old ETH classmate Marcel Grossmann, now a professor of mathematics, who introduced him to Riemannian geometry and, more generally, to differential geometry. On the recommendation of Italian mathematician Tullio Levi-Civita, Einstein began exploring the usefulness of general covariance (essentially the use of tensors) for his gravitational theory. For a while, Einstein thought that there were problems with the approach, but he later returned to it and, by late 1915, had published his general theory of relativity in the form in which it is used today. This theory explains gravitation as the distortion of the structure of spacetime by matter, affecting the inertial motion of other matter.

During World War I, the work of Central Powers scientists was available only to Central Powers academics, for national security reasons. Some of Einstein's work did reach the United Kingdom and the United States through the efforts of the Austrian Paul Ehrenfest and physicists in the Netherlands, especially 1902 Nobel Prize-winner Hendrik Lorentz and Willem de Sitter of Leiden University. After the war, Einstein maintained his relationship with Leiden University, accepting a contract as an Extraordinary Professor; for ten years, from 1920 to 1930, he travelled to the Netherlands regularly to lecture.

In 1917, several astronomers accepted Einstein's 1911 challenge from Prague. The Mount Wilson Observatory in California, United States, published a solar spectroscopic analysis that showed no gravitational redshift. In 1918, the Lick Observatory, also in California, announced that it too had disproved Einstein's prediction, although its findings were not published.

However, in May 1919, a team led by the British astronomer Arthur Stanley Eddington claimed to have confirmed Einstein's prediction of gravitational deflection of starlight by the sun while photographing a solar eclipse with dual expeditions in Sobral, northern Brazil, and Príncipe, a west African island. Nobel laureate Max Born praised general relativity as the "greatest feat of human thinking about nature"; fellow laureate Paul Dirac was quoted saying it was "probably the greatest scientific discovery ever made".

There have been claims that scrutiny of the specific photographs taken on the Eddington expedition showed the experimental uncertainty to be comparable to the magnitude of the effect Eddington claimed to have demonstrated, and that a 1962 British expedition concluded that the method was inherently unreliable. The deflection of light during a solar eclipse was confirmed by later, more accurate observations. Some resented the newcomer's fame, notably some nationalistic German physicists, who later started the Deutsche Physik (German Physics) movement.

=== General covariance and the hole argument ===
By 1912, Einstein was actively seeking a theory in which gravitation was explained as a geometric phenomenon. At the urging of Tullio Levi-Civita, Einstein began by exploring the use of general covariance (which is essentially the use of curvature tensors) to create a gravitational theory. However, in 1913 Einstein abandoned that approach, arguing that it is inconsistent based on the "hole argument". In 1914 and much of 1915, Einstein was trying to create field equations based on another approach. When that approach was proven to be inconsistent, Einstein revisited the concept of general covariance and discovered that the hole argument was flawed.

=== The development of the Einstein field equations ===
When Einstein realized that general covariance was tenable, he quickly completed the development of the field equations that are named after him. However, he made a now-famous mistake. The field equations he published in October 1915 were

$$R_{\mu\nu} = \kappa T_{\mu\nu}\,$$

where $R_{\mu\nu}$ is the Ricci tensor, $T_{\mu\nu}$ the energy–momentum tensor and $\kappa$ is Einstein gravitational constant. This predicted the non-Newtonian perihelion precession of Mercury, and so had Einstein very excited. However, it was soon realized that they were inconsistent with the local conservation of energy–momentum unless the universe had a constant density of mass–energy–momentum. In other words, air, rock and even a vacuum should all have the same density. This inconsistency with observation sent Einstein back to the drawing board and, on 25 November 1915, Einstein presented the updated Einstein field equations to the Prussian Academy of Sciences:

$$R_{\mu\nu} - \tfrac12 R g_{\mu\nu} = \kappa T_{\mu\nu}$$,

where $R$ is the Ricci scalar and $g_{\mu\nu}$ the metric tensor. With the publication of the field equations, the issue became one of solving them for various cases and interpreting the solutions. This and experimental verification have dominated general relativity research ever since.

=== Einstein and Hilbert ===
In the last year of Einstein's work on general relativity he met with and corresponded with the German mathematician David Hilbert. Hilbert had been working on a unified field theory based on the ideas of Gustav Mie; he derived the theory of general relativity from an elegant variational principle almost simultaneously with Einstein's discovery of the theory. The timing of the correspondence and publications has led to a number of in depth historical analyses.

=== Sir Arthur Eddington ===
In the early years after Einstein's theory was published, Sir Arthur Eddington lent his considerable prestige in the British scientific establishment in an effort to champion the work of this German scientist. Because the theory was so complex and abstruse (even today it is popularly considered the pinnacle of scientific thinking; in the early years it was even more so), it was rumored that only three people in the world understood it. There was an illuminating, though probably apocryphal, anecdote about this. As related by Ludwik Silberstein, during one of Eddington's lectures he asked "Professor Eddington, you must be one of three persons in the world who understands general relativity." Eddington paused, unable to answer. Silberstein continued "Don't be modest, Eddington!" Finally, Eddington replied "On the contrary, I'm trying to think who the third person is."

== Solutions ==
=== The Schwarzschild solution ===
Since the field equations are non-linear, Einstein assumed that they were unsolvable. However, Karl Schwarzschild discovered in 1915 and published in 1916 an exact solution for the case of a spherically symmetric spacetime surrounding a massive object in spherical coordinates. This is now known as the Schwarzschild solution. Since then, many other exact solutions have been found.

=== The expanding universe and the cosmological constant ===
In 1922, Alexander Friedmann found a solution in which the universe may expand or contract, and later Georges Lemaître derived a solution for an expanding universe. However, Einstein believed that the universe was static, and since a static cosmology was not supported by the general relativistic field equations, he added a cosmological constant $\Lambda$ to the field equations, which became:

$$R_{\mu\nu} - \tfrac12 R g_{\mu\nu} + \Lambda g_{\mu\nu} = \kappa T_{\mu\nu}$$.

This permitted the creation of steady-state solutions, but they were unstable: the slightest perturbation of a static state would result in the universe expanding or contracting. In 1929, Edwin Hubble found evidence for the universe expanding. This resulted in Einstein dropping the cosmological constant, referring to it as "the biggest blunder in my career". At the time, it was an ad hoc hypothesis to add in the cosmological constant, as it was only intended to justify one result (a static universe).

=== More exact solutions ===
Progress in solving the field equations and understanding the solutions has been ongoing. The solution for a spherically symmetric charged object was discovered by Reissner and later rediscovered by Nordström, and is called the Reissner–Nordström solution. The black hole aspect of the Schwarzschild solution was very controversial, and Einstein did not believe that singularities could be real. However, in 1957 (two years after Einstein's death), Martin Kruskal published a proof that black holes are called for by the Schwarzschild solution. Additionally, the solution for a rotating massive object was obtained by Roy Kerr in the 1960s and is called the Kerr solution. The Kerr–Newman solution for a rotating, charged massive object was published a few years later.

== Testing the theory ==
The first piece of evidence in support of general relativity came from its correct prediction of the anomalous rate of precession of Mercury's orbit. Subsequently, Arthur Stanley Eddington's 1919 expedition confirmed Einstein's prediction of the deflection of light by the Sun during the total solar eclipse of 29 May 1919, which helped to cement the status of general relativity as a viable theory. Since then, many observations have shown agreement with the predictions of general relativity. These include studies of binary pulsars, observations of radio signals passing the limb of the Sun, and even the global positioning system.

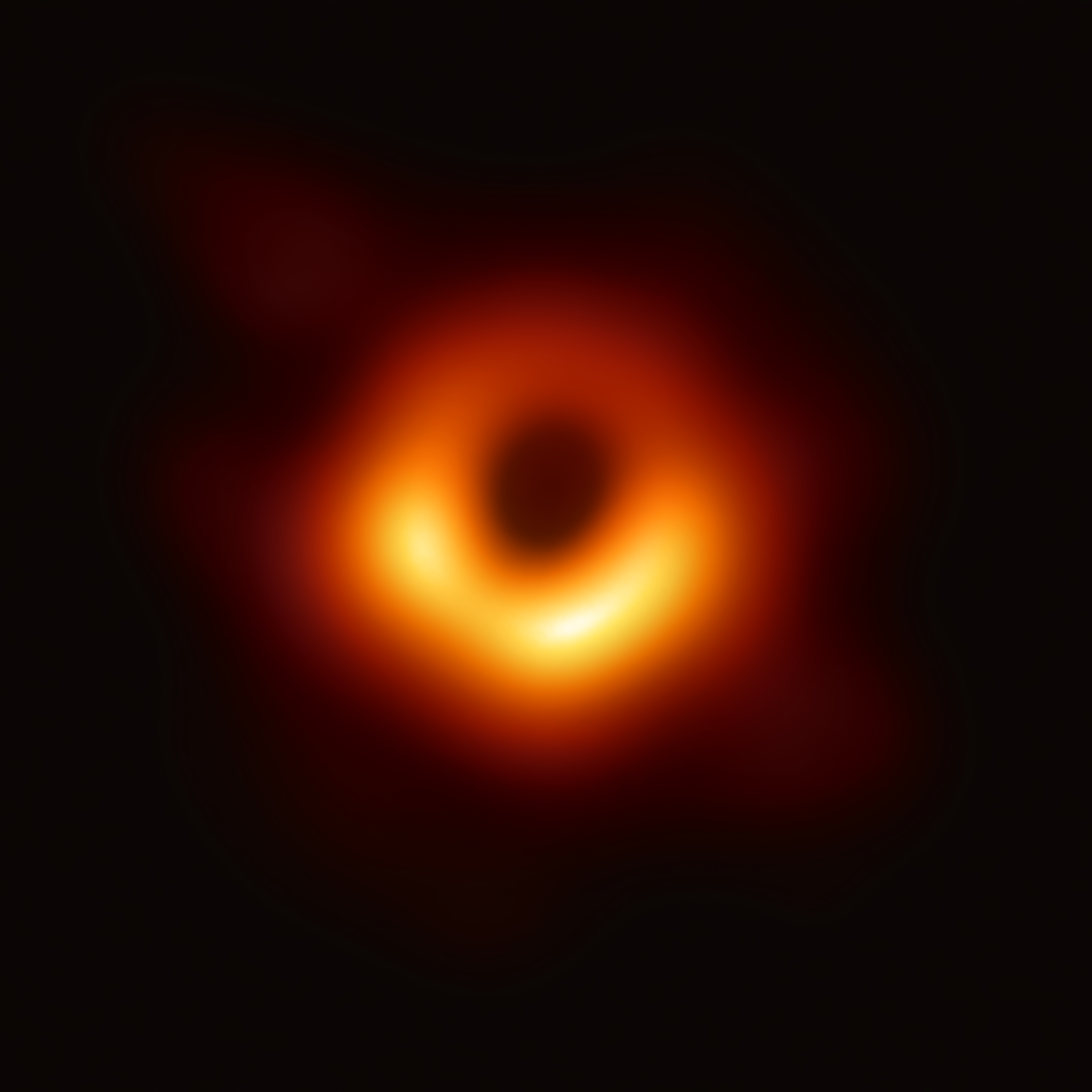
First image of the event horizon of a black hole (M87*) captured by the Event Horizon Telescope

The theory predicts gravitational waves, which are ripples in the curvature of spacetime that propagate as waves, travelling outward from the source. The first observation of gravitational waves, which came from the merger of two black holes, was made on 14 September 2015 by the Advanced LIGO team, corroborating another prediction of the theory 100 years after it was published.

The first image of a black hole, the supermassive one at the center of galaxy Messier 87, was published by the Event Horizon Telescope Collaboration on 10 April 2019.

== Alternative theories ==
There have been various attempts to find modifications to general relativity. The most famous of these are the Brans–Dicke theory (also known as scalar–tensor theory), and Rosen's bimetric theory. Both of these theories proposed changes to the field equations of general relativity, and both suffer from these changes permitting the presence of bipolar gravitational radiation. As a result, Rosen's original theory has been refuted by observations of binary pulsars. As for Brans–Dicke (which has a tunable parameter ω such that ω = ∞ is the same as general relativity), the amount by which it can differ from general relativity has been severely constrained by these observations. Many other alternatives to general relativity have also been ruled out by analyses of the neutron-star merger GW170817.

In addition, general relativity is inconsistent with quantum mechanics, the physical theory that describes the wave–particle duality of matter, and quantum mechanics does not currently describe gravitational attraction at relevant (microscopic) scales. There is a great deal of speculation in the physics community as to the modifications that might be needed to both general relativity and quantum mechanics in order to unite them consistently. The speculative theory that unites general relativity and quantum mechanics is usually called quantum gravity, prominent examples of which include string theory and loop quantum gravity.

== Golden age ==
Kip Thorne identifies the "golden age of black hole research" as the period roughly from 1960 to 1975, during which the study of general relativity, which had previously been regarded as something of a curiosity, entered the mainstream of theoretical physics. During this period, many of the concepts and terms which continue to inspire the imaginations of gravitation researchers and the general public were introduced, including black holes and gravitational singularities. At the same time, in a closely related development, the study of physical cosmology entered the mainstream and the Big Bang became well established.

Fulvio Melia refers frequently to the "golden age of relativity" in his book Cracking the Einstein Code. Andrzej Trautman hosted a relativity conference in Warsaw in 1962 to which Melia refers:

General relativity moved very successfully from that meeting in Warsaw, hot on the heels of the Pound–Rebka experiment, and entered its golden age of discovery that lasted into the mid-1970s.

Roy Kerr, protagonist of the book, contributed an Afterword, saying of the book: "It is a remarkable piece of writing capturing beautifully the period we now refer to as the golden age of relativity."

== See also ==
- List of contributors to general relativity
- Golden age of cosmology
- Golden age of physics
- Mach's principle
- Timeline of gravitational physics and relativity
- W. K. Clifford#Premonition of relativity
