= Bodybuilding in the United States =

Bodybuilding in the United States of America
- Highest governing body: IFBB Professional League
- Nicknames: US BB, USA, BB, A BB

Characteristics
- Contact: No
- Team members: No teams
- Mixed-sex: No
- Type: Indoor
- Equipment: Bikinis & thongs
- Venue: Auditorium

Presence
- Country or region: United States of America
- Olympic: No
- World Championships: 1978–2017, 2020
- Paralympic: No
- World Games: 1981, 1985, 1989, 1993, 2001, 2005 & 2009

Bodybuilding in the United States traces its early history to the 1860s when it was based on the east coast. By the 1940s, it had arrived in Hawaii. In the same period, the country was involved with the early internationalization of the sport. The sport had a golden age during the 1960s and 1970s when much of the activity was taking place on the west coast. Bodybuilding for women began to take off during the 1970s. A number of changes took place in the 1980s.

== History ==
Gymnasiums began to be built in the United States during the 1860s, with most of the first ones based on the east coast. The spread of the tradition of physical conditioning was helped during this era because of the concept of muscular Christianity. In 1944, the sport made its way to Hawaii. By 1948, a resident of San Francisco moved to Oahu and opened a gym, one of the few at the time that catered to the specific needs of bodybuilders. The gym, Mit-Miks Health Studio, became one of the most influential centers for the sport in the state.

During the 1940s and 1950s, Chuck Sipes and Bill Pearl were two of the most entertaining bodybuilders in the United States. Their influence began to wane during the 1950s though as other competitors came on the scene. The United States was one of the two founding members of the International Federation of Bodybuilders, which was created by Ben and Joe Weider in 1946. A Mr. Hawaii competition was being held in 1950. A Mr. America contest was being held by 1953. By 1955, there was a national magazine for the sport.

The golden era of bodybuilding on the United States's west coast took place in the 1960s and 1970s, with much of the most active scene occurring in California. A fair amount of this activity took place at Golds Gym in Santa Monica, which was the home base for a number of competitors during this era including Arnold Schwarzenegger.

Bodybuilding for women began to take off during the 1970s at a time when culturally there was a tension between governmental attempts to control women's bodies, and women trying to exert control using their own physicality. Bodybuilding was seen by some women as form of recognition of their physical strength. During this period, bodybuilding judges in the United States were debating the standards to which women should be judged in competition and if they should be using the masculine ideal.

In 1971, Jim Morris became the first openly gay IFBB professional bodybuilder. In 1973 he became the first openly gay bodybuilder to win AAU Mr. America overall, most muscular, best arms, and best chest titles.

In 1979, the Hawaiian Islands Body Building Championships were held for the first time, and assisted in renewing interest in the sport in Hawaii. During the 1980s, the sport underwent a number of changes in the United States and internationally as it sought to appear more of a sport. This included changing the names of several competitions held in the United States. In 1982, Chris Dickerson became the first African American to win the Mr. America contest.

In 1990, the Hawaiian Islands Body Building Championships included a women's competition for the first time. The 1992 edition of the Ms. Olympia contest was held in Chicago, Illinois with 20 competitors, including at least one from the United States.

== Governance ==
The United States has a national organization: the NPC that is recognized by the IFBB Pro League as the national federation, representing the country's bodybuilding community.

== Pictures ==
Amateur

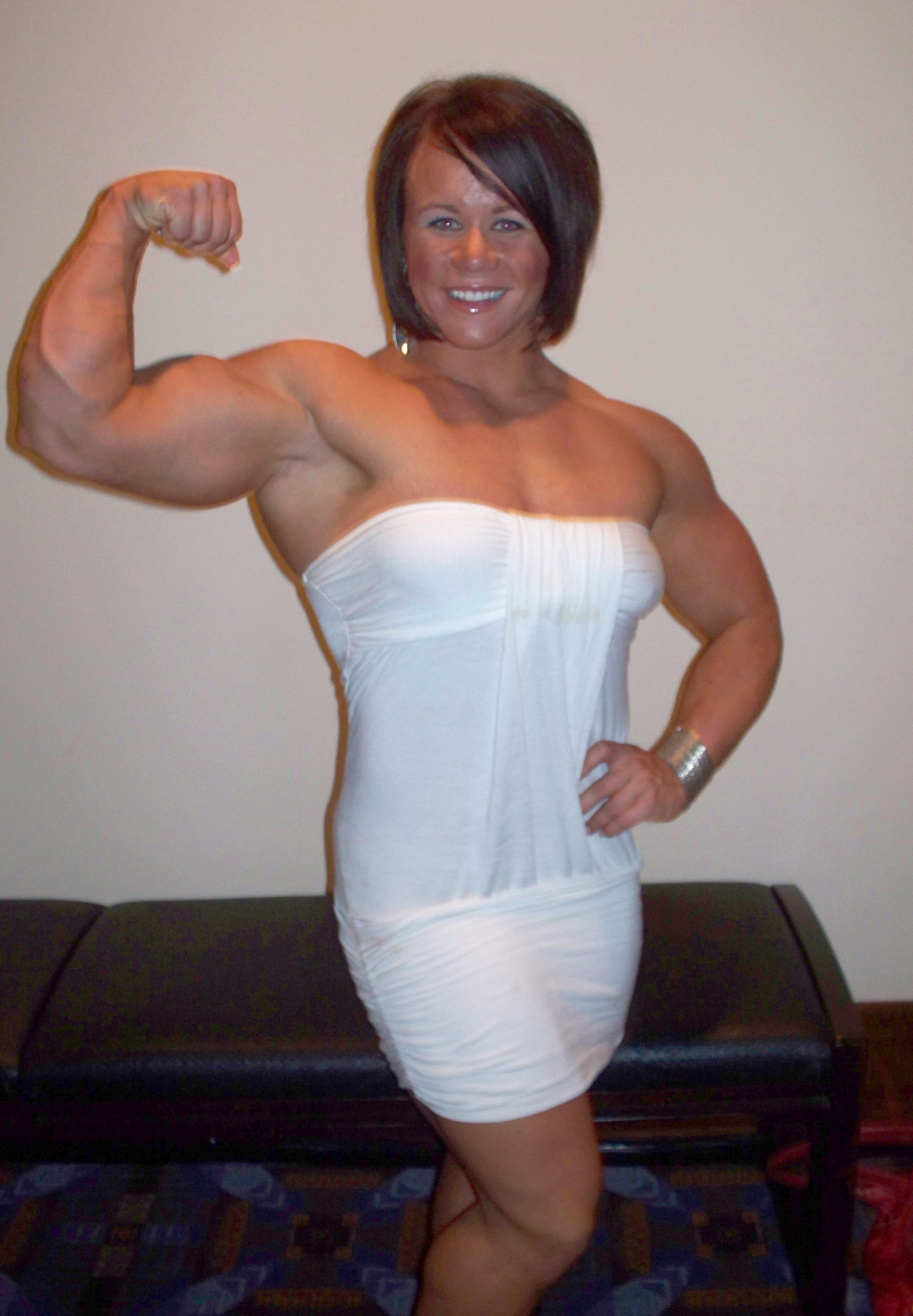
Aleesha Young doing a front right bicep pose at the 2008 NPC Jr. Nationals

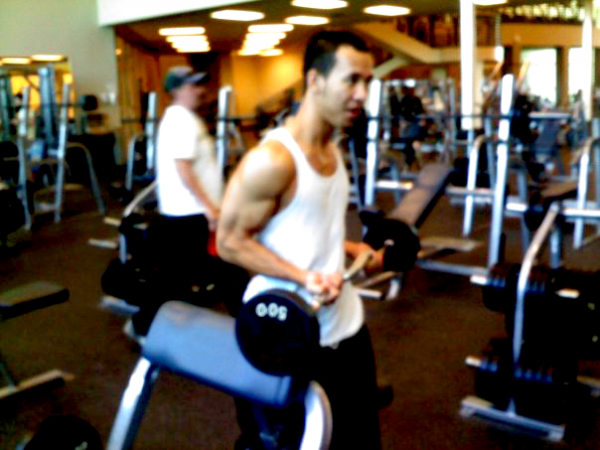
Dang Nguyen at L.A Fitness

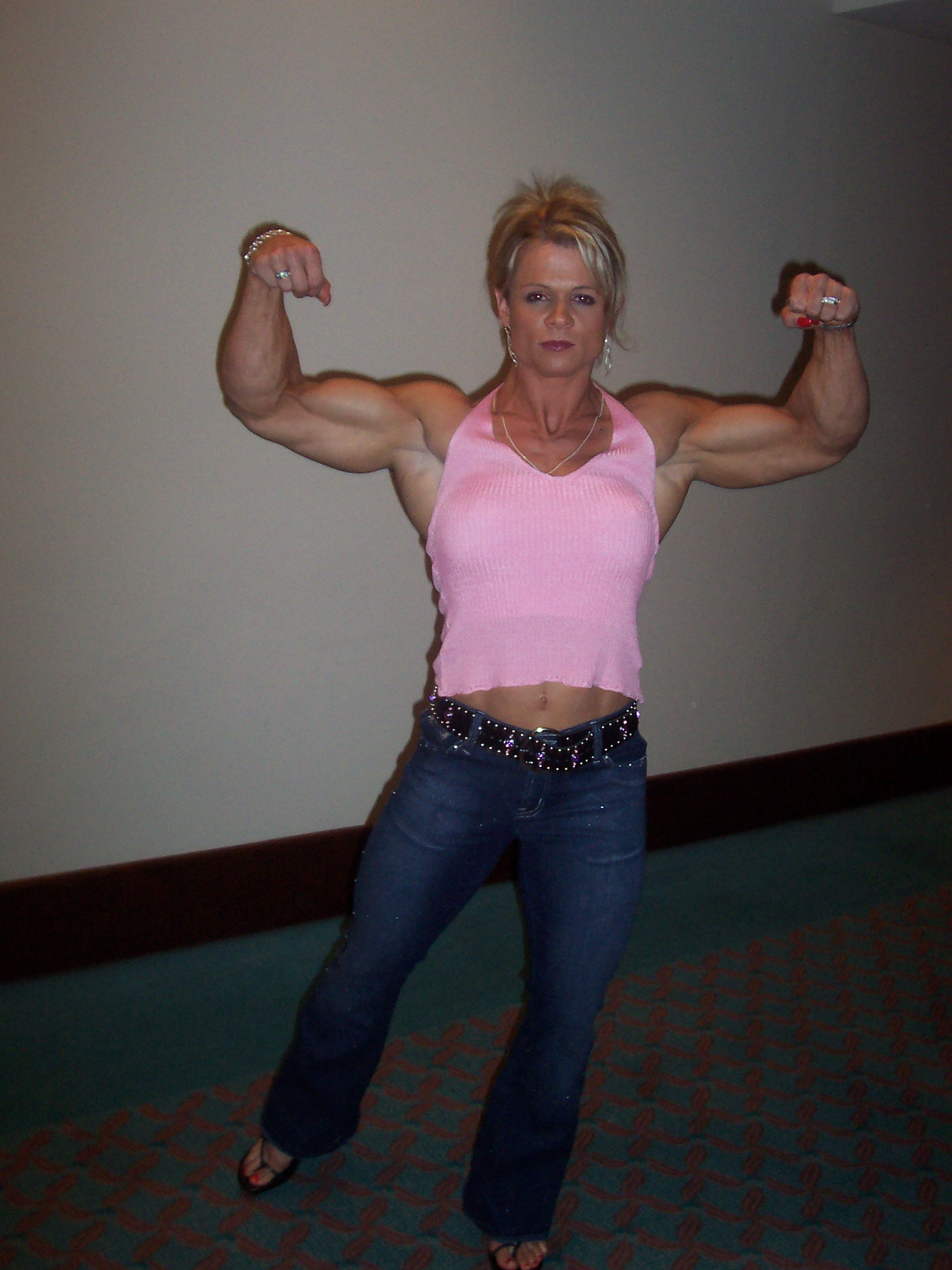
Elena Seiple doing a front double biceps pose at the 2005 NPC Jr. Nationals

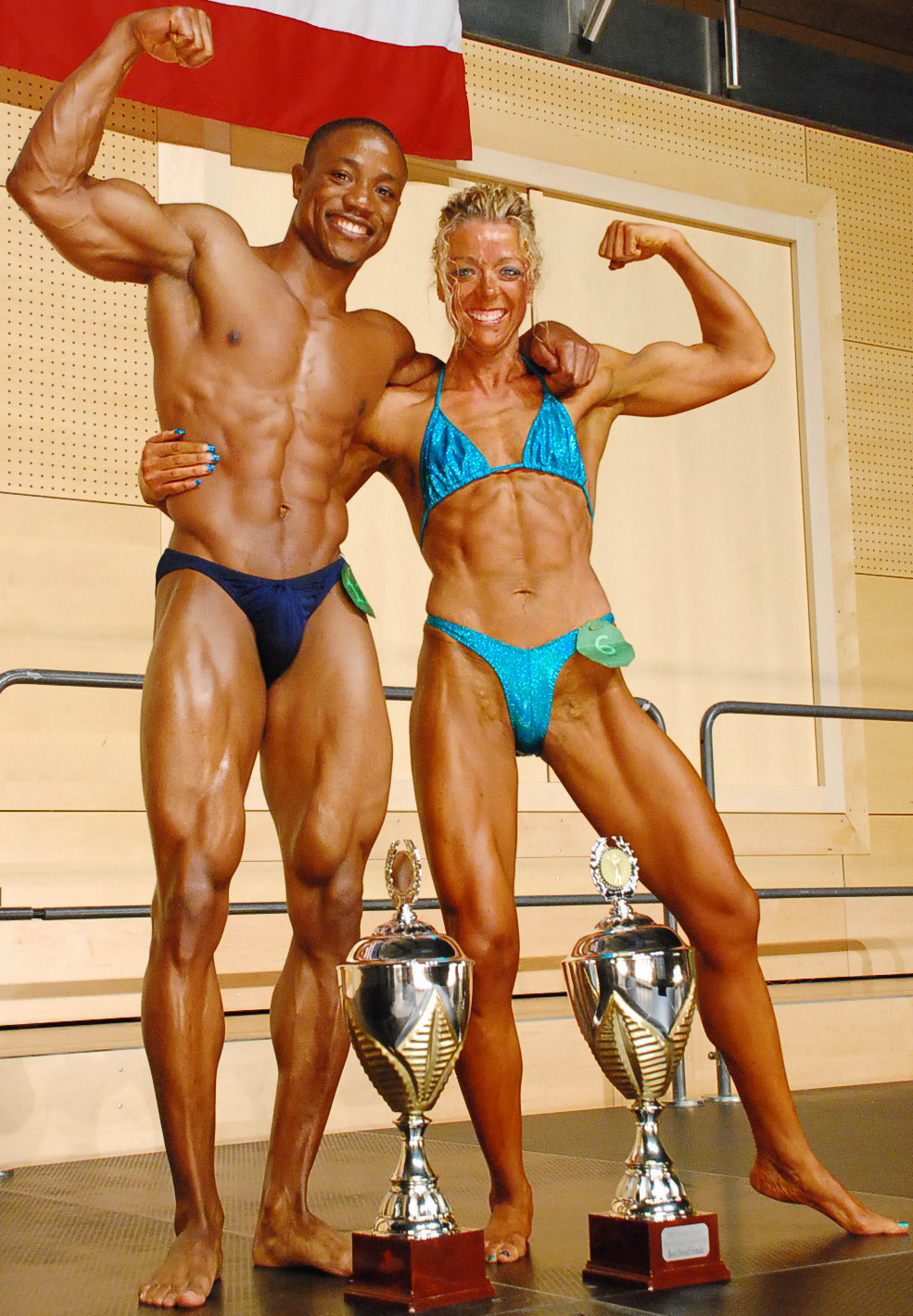
Overall U.S. Forces Europe bodybuilding champions Kenyatta Wilson and Sandi Griffin pose after receiving the hardware.

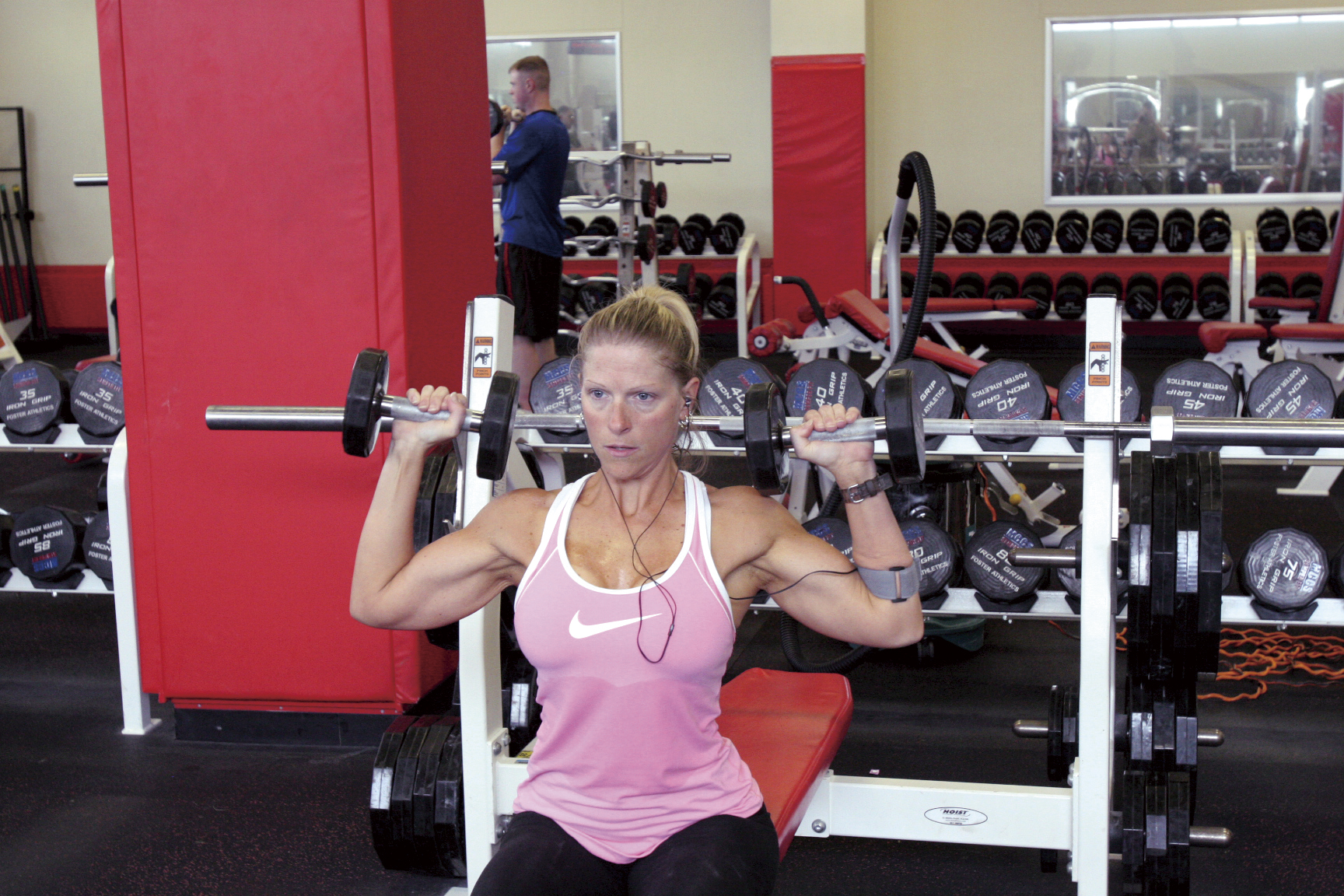
A bodybuilder preparing for the 15th Annual Far East Bodybuilding Competition at the Camp Foster

Professional

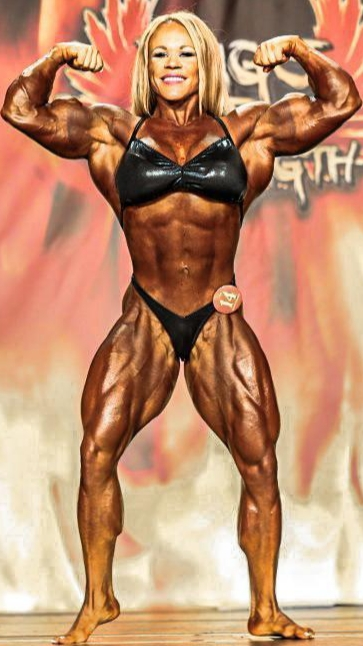
Aleesha Young doing a front double biceps pose at the 2015 Rising Phoenix World Championships.

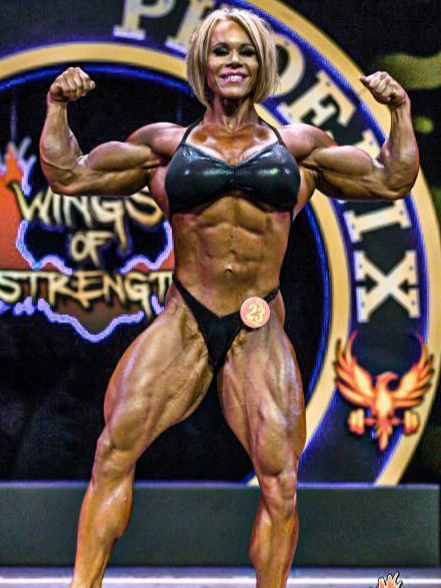
Aleesha Young doing a front double biceps pose at the 2017 Rising Phoenix World Championships.

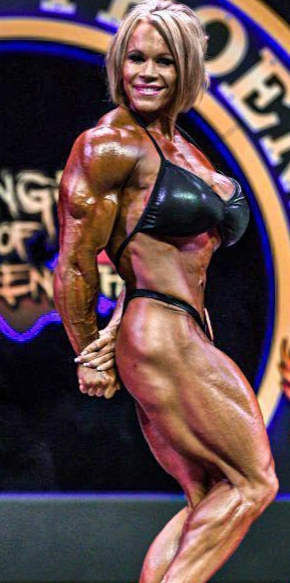
Aleesha Young doing a side triceps pose at the 2017 Rising Phoenix World Championships.

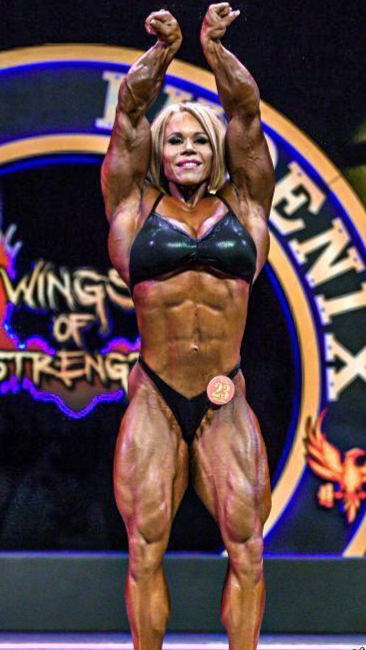
Aleesha Young posing at the 2017 Rising Phoenix World Championships.

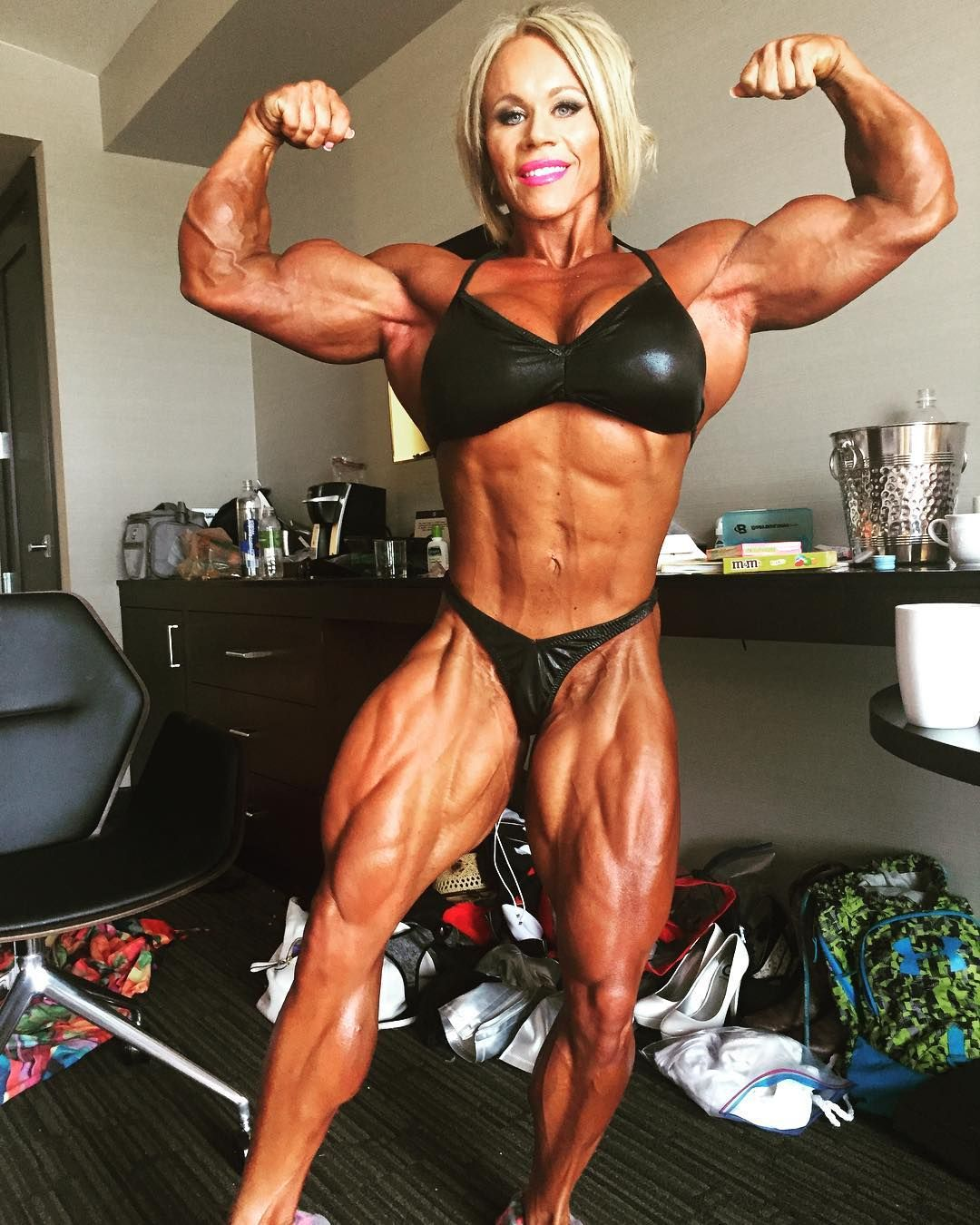
Aleesha Young doing a front double biceps pose on 30 September 2017.

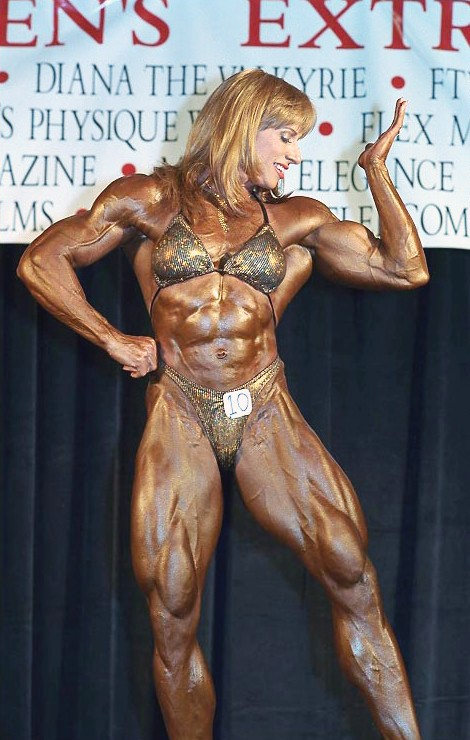
Betty Pariso doing a front right bicep pose at the 2001 Extravaganza Strength Contest.

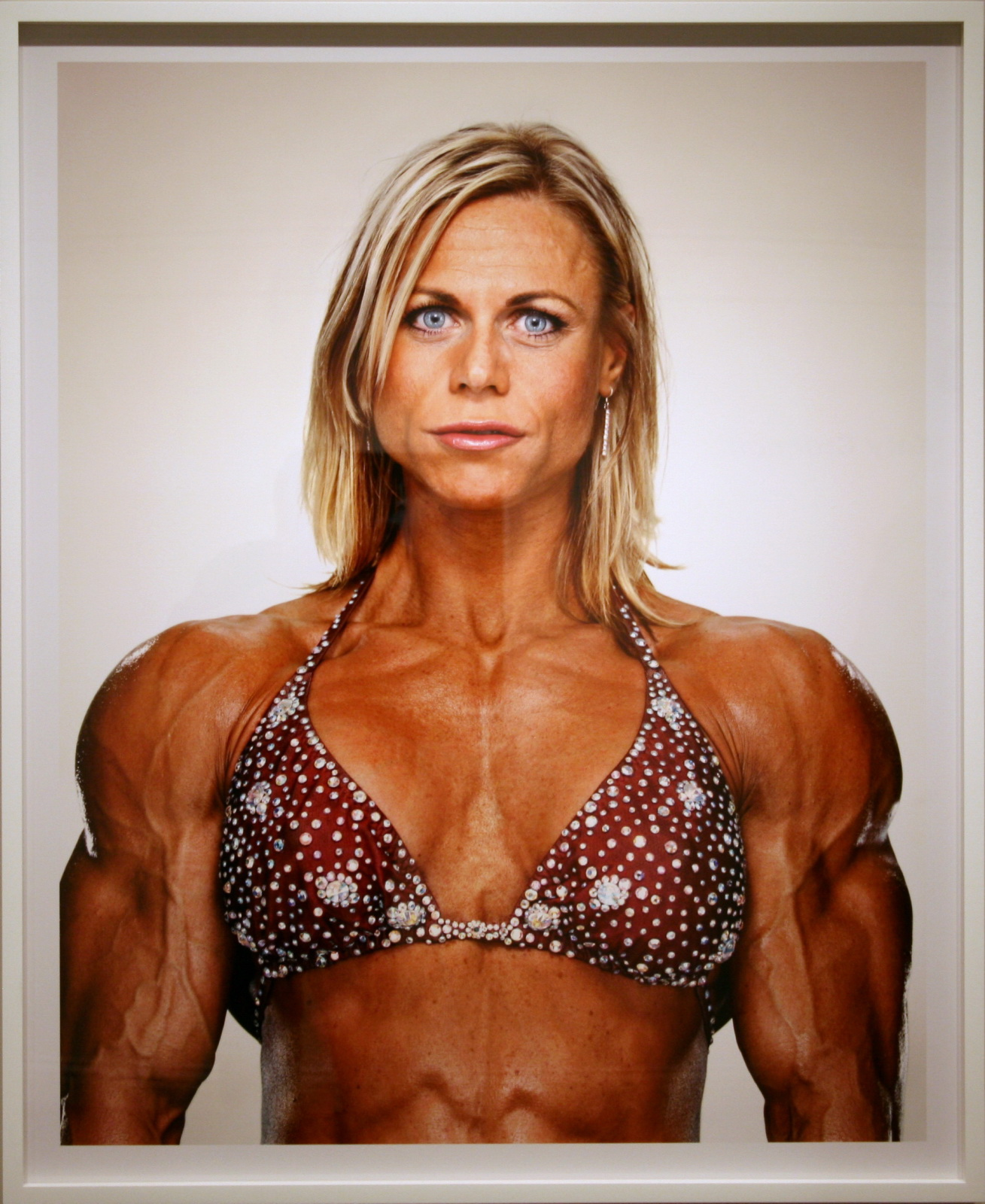

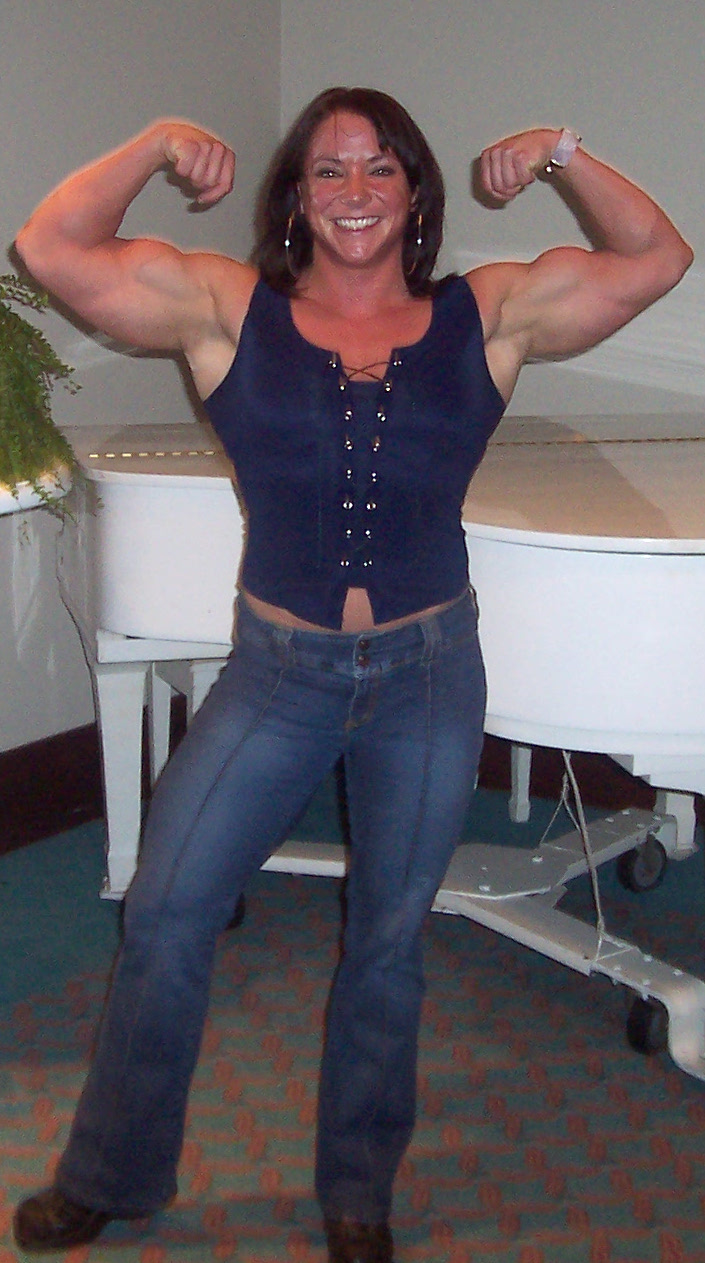
Sarah Dunlap doing a front double biceps pose at the 2005 NPC Jr. Nationals

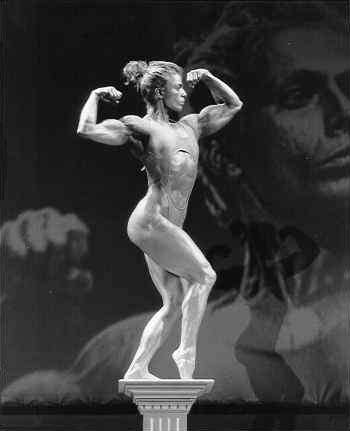

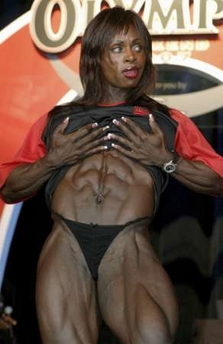
Dayana Cadeau doing an abdominal pose against Iris Kyle at the 2007 Olympia Press Conference.

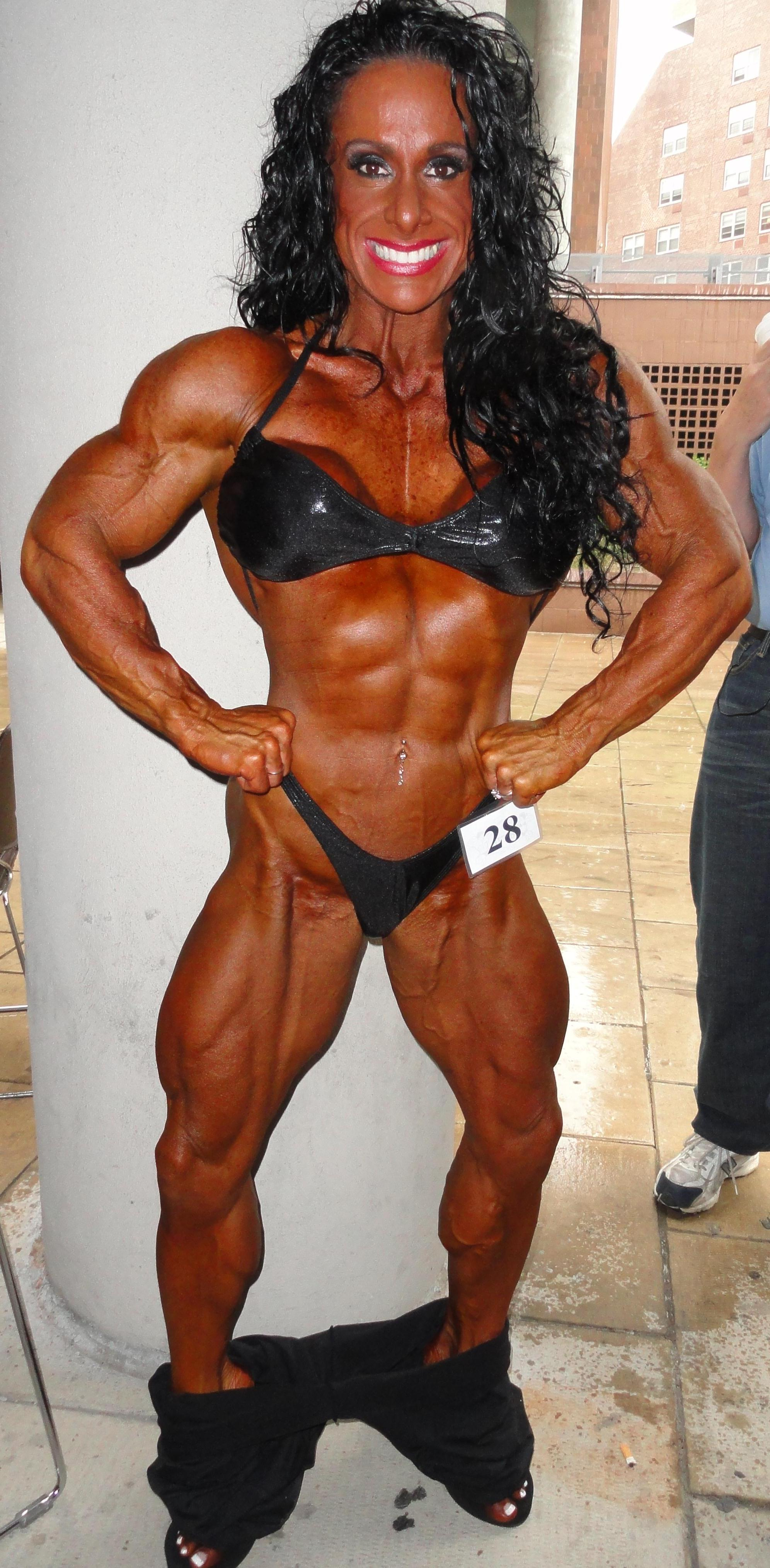
Debbie Bramwell poses before the 2010 IFBB New York Pro Competition, where she finished 4th.

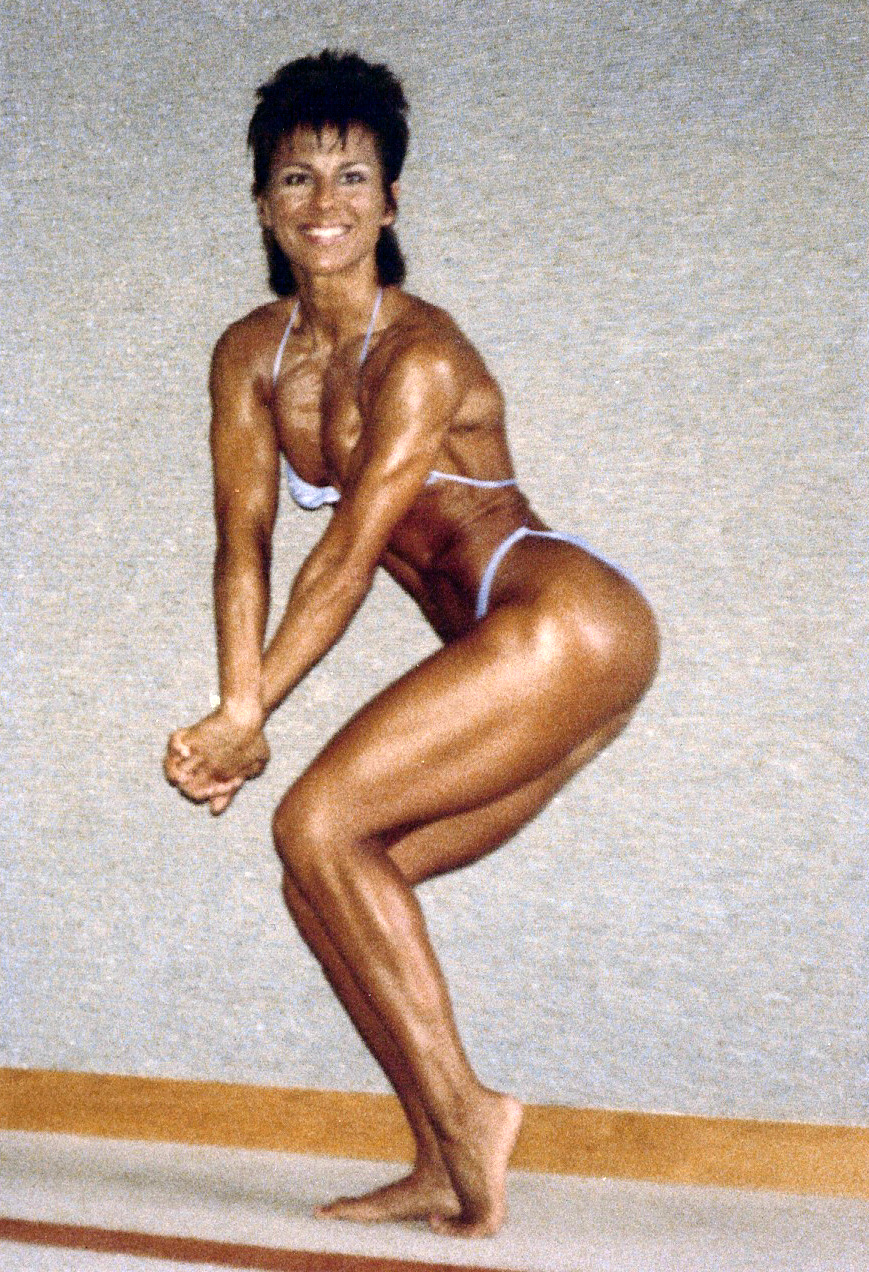
Kathy Segal, AAU Ms. International Bodybuilding Champion

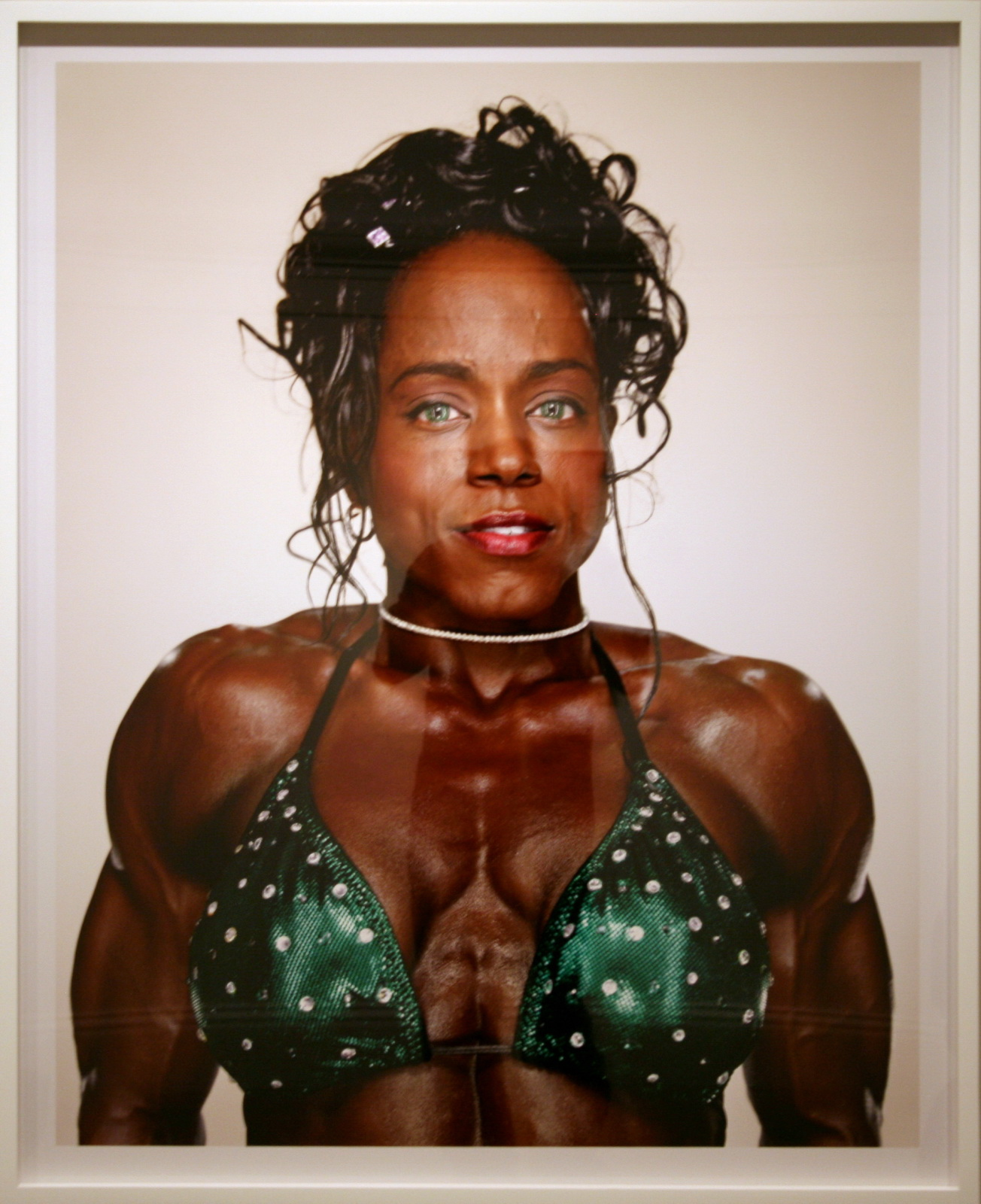
Portrait of Kim Harris in 2004 by Martin Schoeller

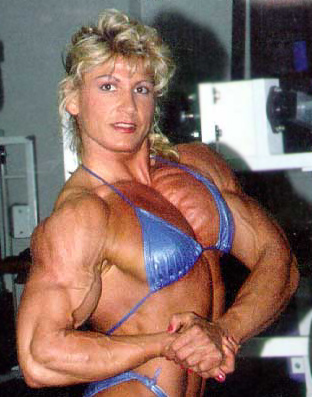
Nikki Fuller doing a side chest pose.

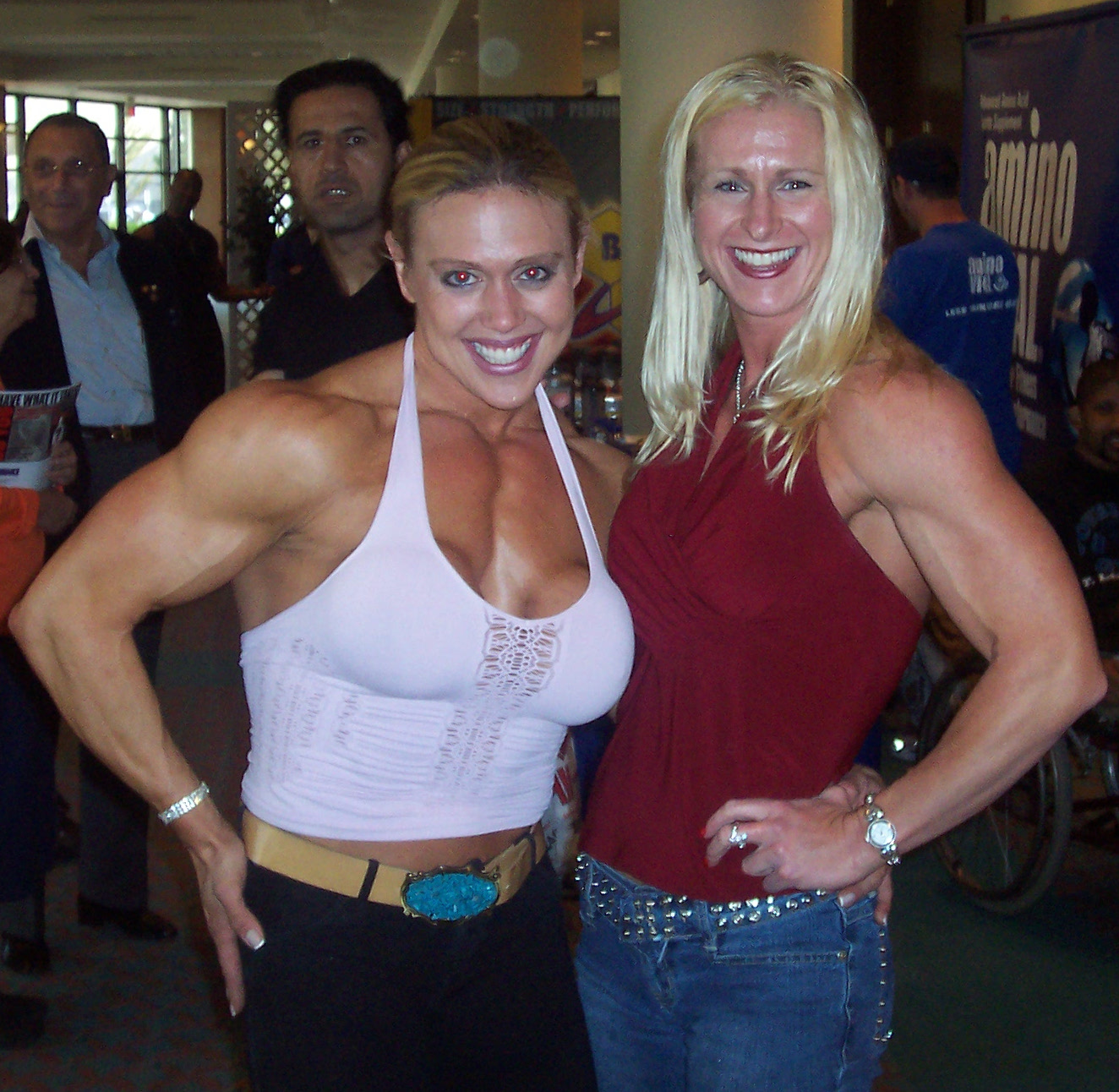

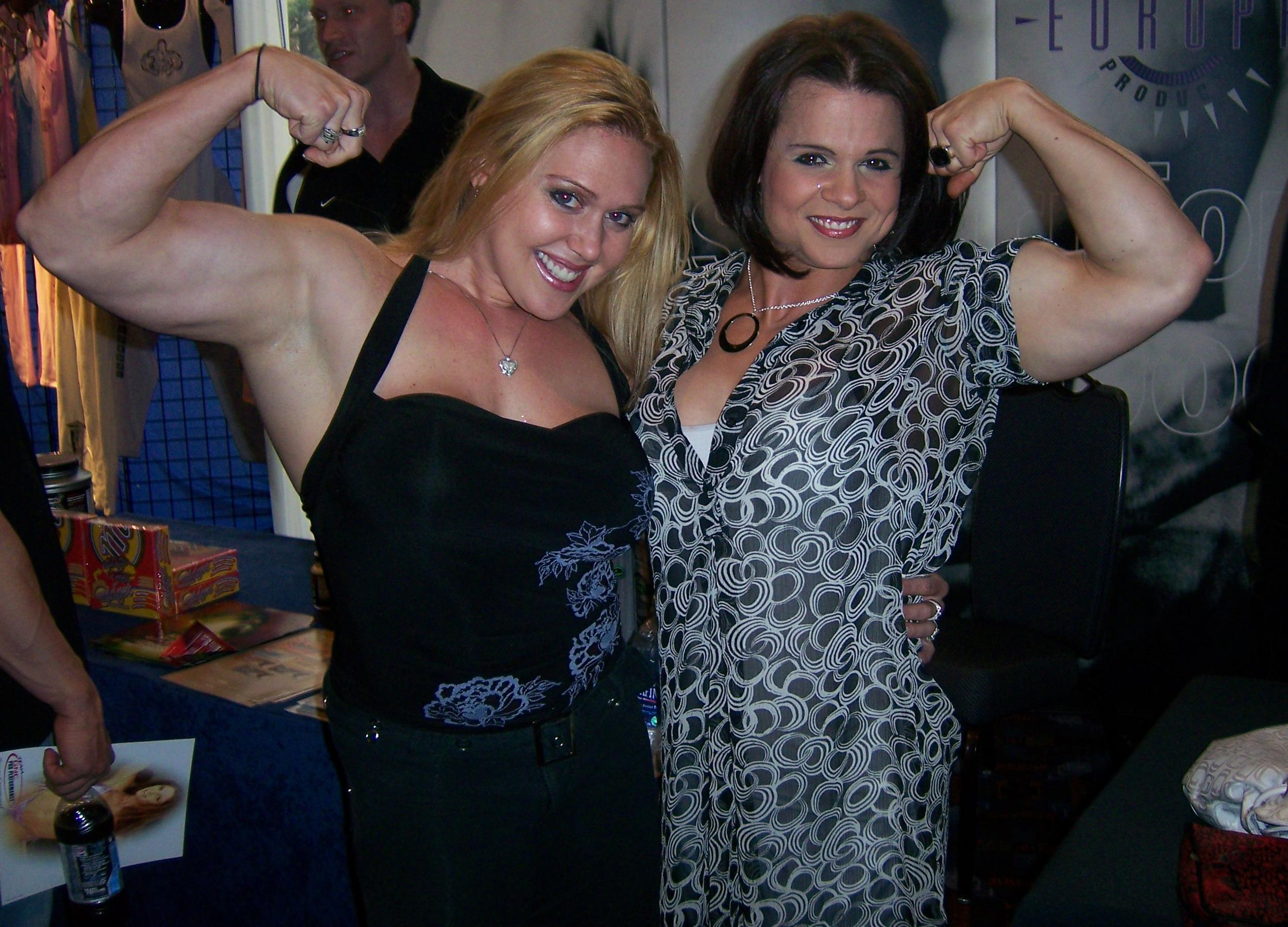

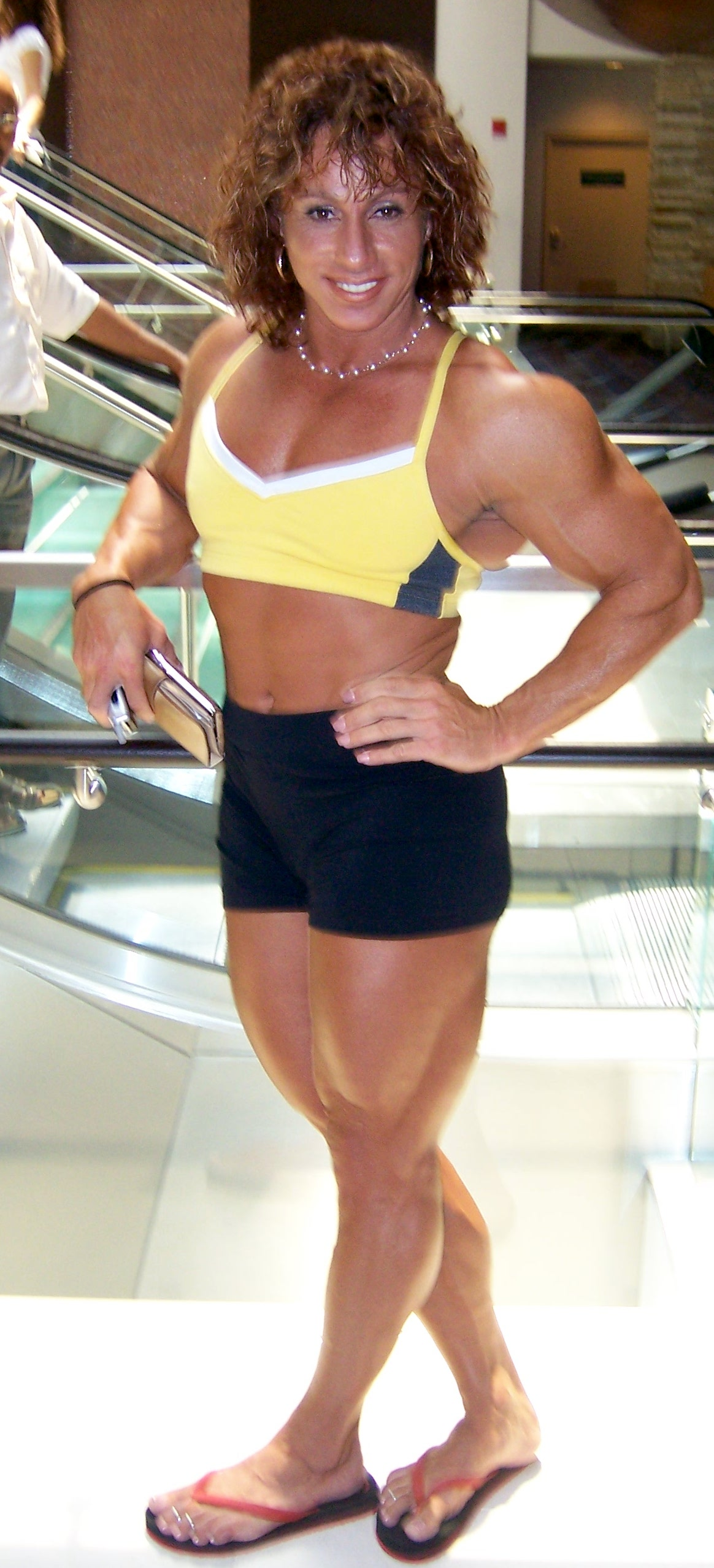

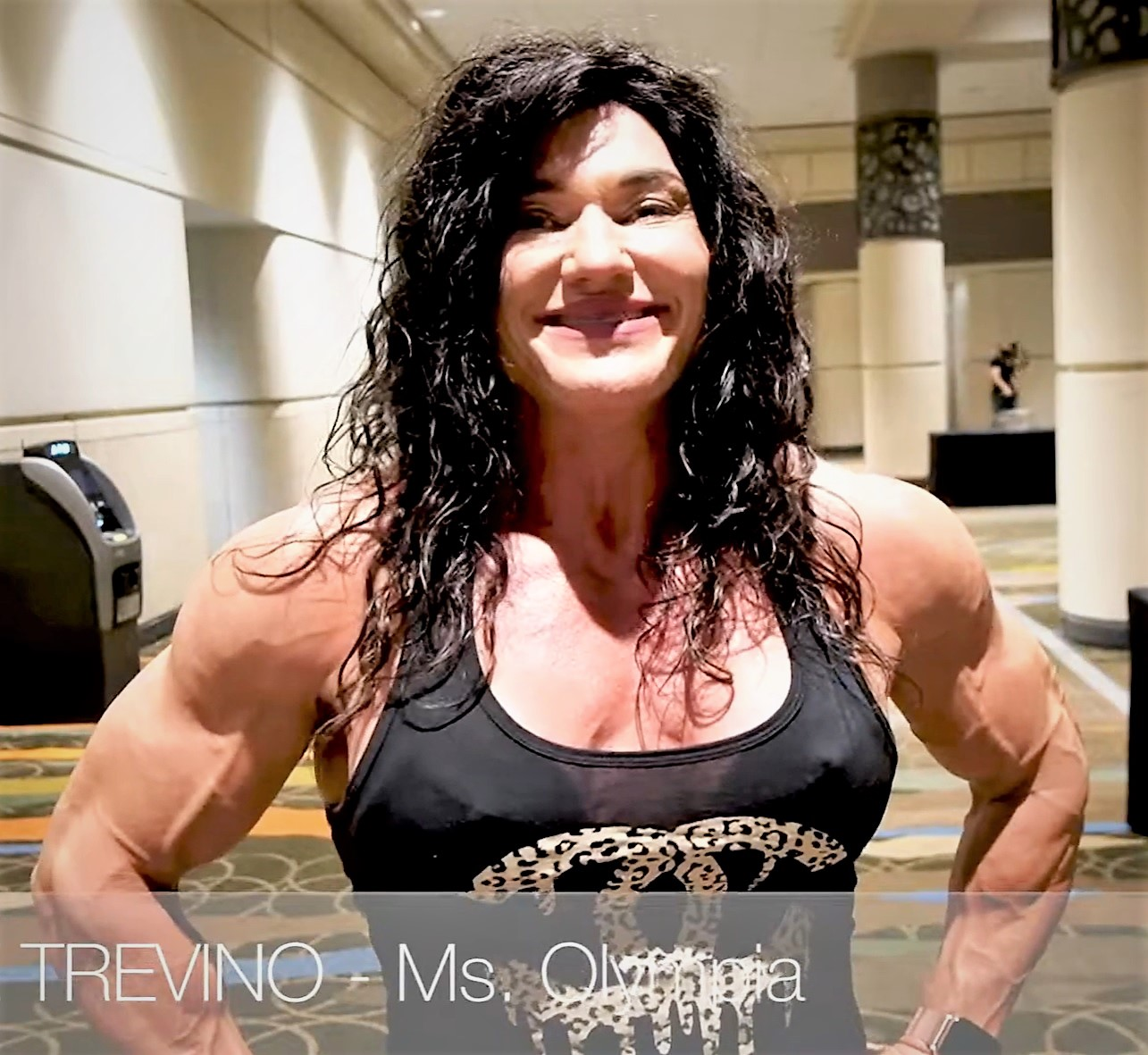

== List of bodybuilding federations in the USA ==
- International Federation of Bodybuilding and Fitness (IFBB)
  - International Federation of Bodybuilding and Fitness Amateur International (IFBB Amateur International; amateur division of the IFBB Elite Pro)
    - International Federation of Bodybuilding and Fitness Elite Pro (IFBB Elite Pro; professional division of the IFBB Amateur International)
      - International Federation of Bodybuilding and Fitness Physique America (IFBBPA; USA division of the IFBB Amateur International and IFBB Elite Pro)
- National Physique Committee (NPC; amateur division of the IFBB Pro League)
  - International Federation of Bodybuilding and Fitness Professional League (IFBB Pro League; professional division of the NPC)
- National Amateur Body-Builders' Association (NABBA; amateur)
  - National Amateur Body-Builders' Association USA (NABBA USA; USA division of the NABBA)
- Physical Culture Association (PCA; amateur and professional)
  - Physical Culture Association International (PCA International; international division of the PCA)
    - Physical Culture Association (PCA USA; USA division of the PCA International)
- World Fitness Federation (WFF; amateur division of the WFF Pro Division)
  - World Fitness Federation Professional Division (WFF Pro Division; professional division of the WFF)

Natural bodybuilding federations

- Amateur Bodybuilding Association (ABA; amateur)
  - International Natural Bodybuilding Association (INBA; amateur division of the PNBA)
    - Professional Natural Bodybuilding Association (PNBA; professional division of INBA)
- American Natural Bodybuilding Federation (ANBF; amateur and professional)
- Drug Free Athletes Coalition (DFAC; amateur and professional)
- IcompeteUSA (USA division of the Icompete Natural Worldwide)
- International Natural Bodybuilding & Fitness (INBF; amateur division of the WNBF)
  - World Natural Bodybuilding Federation (WNBF; professional division of the INBF)
- National Gym Association (NGA; amateur and professional)
- Natural Muscle Association (NMA; amateur and professional)
- North American Natural Bodybuilding Federation (NANBF; amateur division of the IPE)
  - Internation Pro Elite (IPE; professional division of the NANBF)
- Organization of Competitive Bodybuilders (OCB; amateur and professional)
- Super Natural Bodybuilding and Fitness (SNBF; amateur and professional)
- Ultimate Fitness Events (UFE; amateur and professional)
- United States Bodybuilding Federation (USBF; amateur and professional)
