= Golden Age of India =

Periods during which the Indian subcontinent flourished

Certain historical time periods have been named "golden ages", where development flourished, including in the Indian subcontinent.

== Classical era ==
=== Gupta Empire ===
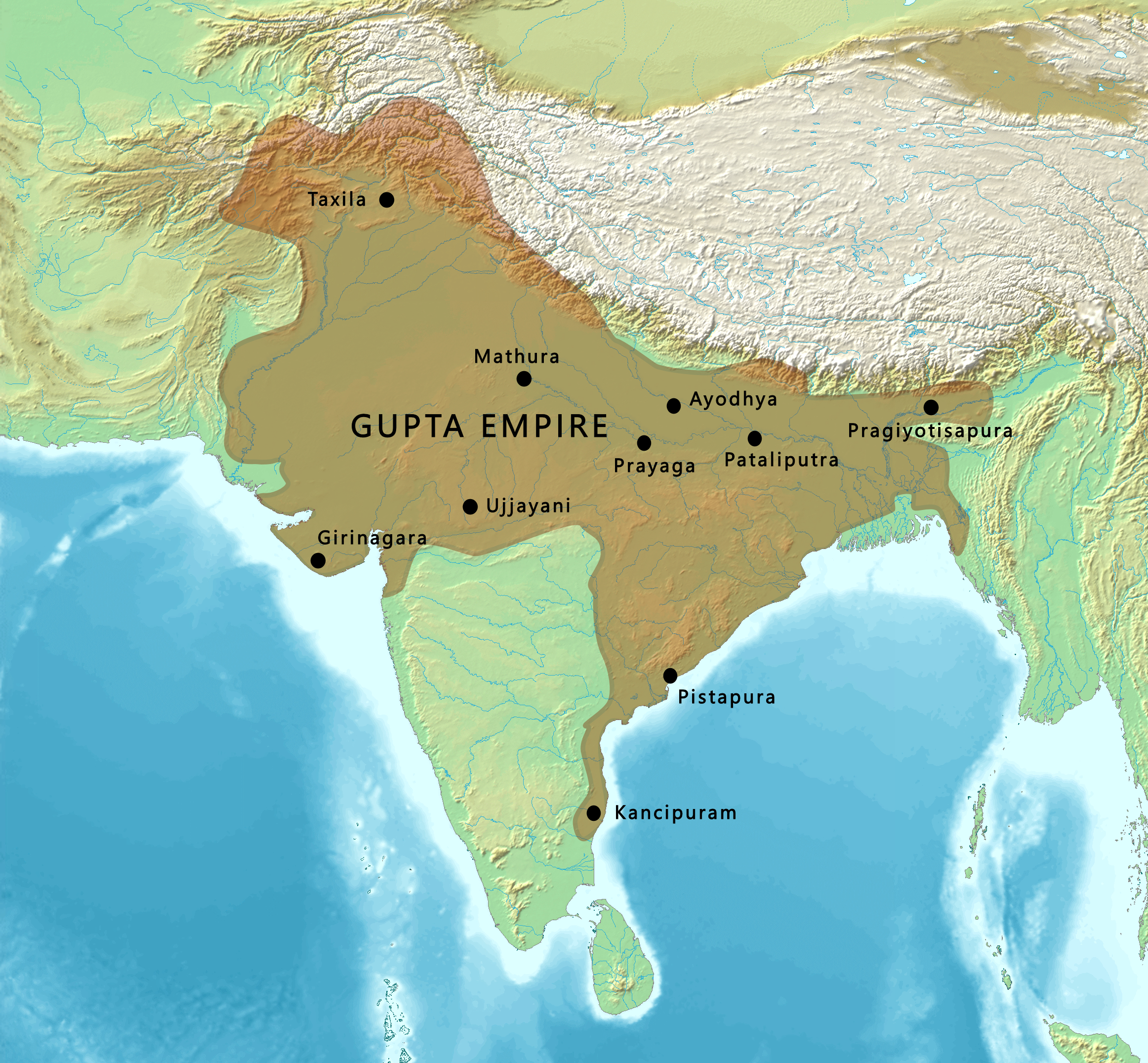
The Gupta Empire under Chandragupta II (375–415)

The period between the 4th and 6th centuries CE is known as the Golden Age of India because of the considerable achievements that were made in the fields of mathematics, astronomy, science, religion, and philosophy, during the Gupta Empire. The decimal numeral system, including the concept of zero, was invented in India during this period. The peace and prosperity created under the leadership of the Guptas enabled the pursuit of scientific and artistic endeavors in India. The Golden Age of India came to an end when the Hunas invaded the Gupta Empire, in the 6th century CE, although this characterisation has been disputed by some other historians. (Note: According to D. N. Jha, caste distinctions became more entrenched and rigid during this time, as prosperity and the favour of the law accrued to the top of the social scale, while the lower orders were degraded further.) (Note: "Historians once regarded the Gupta period (c.320–540) as the classical age of India [...] It was also thought to have been an age of material prosperity, particularly among the urban elite [...] Some of these assumptions have been questioned by more extensive studies of the post-Mauryan, pre-Gupta period. Archaeological evidence from the earlier Kushan levels suggests greater material prosperity, to such a degree that some historians argue for an urban decline in the Gupta period.") The gross domestic product (GDP) of ancient India was estimated to be 32% and 28% of global GDP in 1 AD and 1000 AD, respectively. Also, during the first millennium of the Common Era, the Indian population comprised approximately 27.15%–30.3% of the total world population.

== Late Middle Ages and early modern era ==
=== Mughal Empire ===
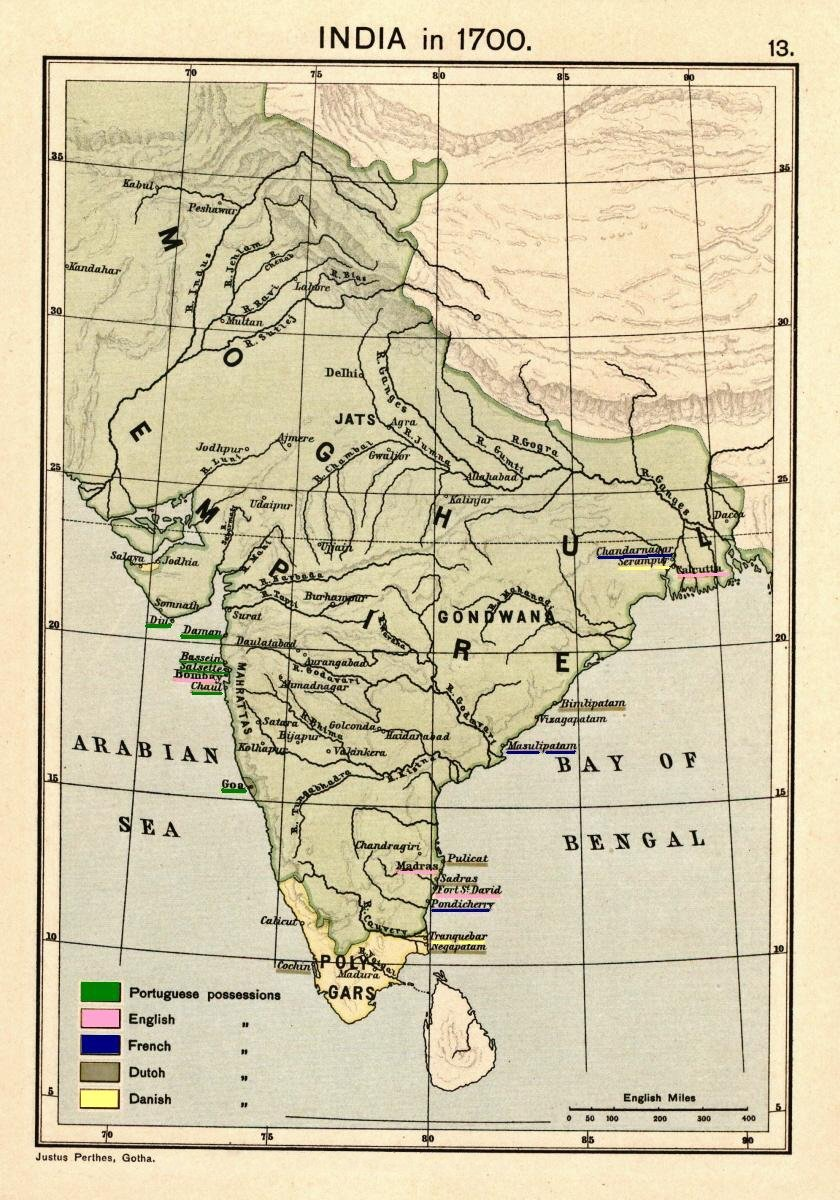
Map of the Mughal Empire at its greatest extent, under Aurangzeb C.1707

The Mughal Empire has often been called the last golden age of India. It was founded in 1526 by Babur of the Barlas clan, after his victories at the First Battle of Panipat and the Battle of Khanwa, against the Delhi Sultanate and Rajput Confederation, respectively. Over the following centuries, under Akbar, Jahangir, and Shah Jahan, the Mughal Empire would grow in area and power and dominate the Indian subcontinent, reaching its maximum extent under Aurangzeb. This imperial structure lasted until 1720, shortly after the death of Aurangzeb, following which it gradually converted from a centralised autocracy into a collection of autonomous vassal states who accepted the nominal suzerainty of the emperor. The empire was formally dissolved by the British Raj after the Indian Rebellion of 1857.

The Mughals adopted and standardised the rupee (rupiya, or silver) and dam (copper) currencies introduced by Sur emperor Sher Shah Suri during his brief rule.

A major sector of the Mughal economy was agriculture. A variety of crops were grown, including food crops such as wheat, rice, and barley, and non-food cash crops such as cotton, indigo, and opium. By the mid-17th century, Indian cultivators began to extensively grow maize and tobacco, imported from the Americas. The Mughal administration emphasised agrarian reform, started by Sher Shah Suri, the work of which Akbar adopted and furthered with more reforms. The civil administration was organised in a hierarchical manner on the basis of merit, with promotions based on performance, exemplified by the common use of the seed drill among Indian peasants, and built irrigation systems across the empire, which produced much higher crop yields and increased the net revenue base, leading to increased agricultural production.

Manufacturing was also a significant contributor to the Mughal economy; the empire produced about 25% of the world's industrial output until the end of the 18th century. Manufactured goods and cash crops were sold throughout the world. Key industries included textiles, shipbuilding, and steel. Processed products included cotton textiles, yarns, thread, silk, jute products, metalware, and foods such as sugar, oils, and butter The Mughal Empire also took advantage of the demand for Indian products in Europe, particularly cotton textiles, as well as goods such as spices, peppers, indigo, silks, and saltpeter (for use in munitions). European fashion, for example, became increasingly dependent on Mughal Indian textiles and silks. From the late 17th century to the early 18th century, India accounted for 95% of British imports from Asia, and Bengal Subah province alone accounted for 40% of Dutch imports from Asia.

The largest manufacturing industry in the Mughal Empire was textile manufacturing, particularly cotton, which included the production of piece goods, calicos, and muslins. By the early 18th century, Mughal Indian textiles were clothing people across the Indian subcontinent, Southeast Asia, Europe, the Americas, Africa, and the Middle East. The most important centre of cotton production was Bengal province, particularly around its capital city of Dhaka.
