= Silver age (disambiguation) =

Silver age may refer to:

- Silver age, name often given to the Ages of Man period within a history, typically as a lesser and later successor to a golden age
- Silver Age of Comic Books, period of artistic advancement and commercial success in mainstream American comic books
- Silver Age of Russian Poetry, traditionally applied by Russian philologists to the first two decades of the 20th century
- Silver Age (album), a 2012 album by Bob Mould
- "Silver Age", a B-side to the Pet Shop Boys' 1999 single "I Don't Know What You Want but I Can't Give It Any More"

== See also ==
- Bronze Age (disambiguation)
- Golden Age (disambiguation)
