= Rule of Ming and Zhang =

The Rule of Ming and Zhang (Chinese: 明章之治) refers to the reigns of Emperor Ming (r. 58–75) and Emperor Zhang (r. 75–88) of the Eastern Han dynasty, which was considered the golden age of that dynasty. Both Emperors Ming and Zhang were generally regarded as able administrators who cared about the welfare of the people and who promoted officials with integrity. After Emperor Zhang's death, the dynasty began to gradually decline.

== See also ==
- Rule of Wen and Jing
- Golden ages of China
