= Bronze Age (disambiguation) =

Bronze Age is an archaeological era. It is the second of the three-age system (Stone Age, Bronze Age, and Iron Age) used for modern classification and study of early human societies.

It may also refer to:

- Bronze Age, one of the Ages of Man in classical Greek mythology attributed to Hesiod
- Bronze Age of Comic Books, a time period in the history of American comic books
- Age of Bronze (comics), a comic book published by Image Comics
- The Age of Bronze, a sculpture by Auguste Rodin

== See also ==
- Copper Age
- Age (disambiguation)
- Bronze (disambiguation)
- Age of Bronze (disambiguation)
- Golden Age (disambiguation)
- Silver age (disambiguation)
