= Golden age of Belarusian history =

The Golden age of Belarusian history is a metaphorical term relating to the 15th-16th century period of the Grand Duchy of Lithuania.

The term is sometimes associated with a certain relaxation, and even partial and temporary reversion, of the Polish and Catholic cultural-religious expansion (end of the 14th–17th centuries) to Ruthenian Lands (that is, Eastern Slavic and Orthodox areas) of the Grand Duchy of Lithuania from the 1500s–1570s, especially during the 1550s–1570s. However, as a large percentage of the population of what is now Belarus had been Roman Catholic or Protestant at that time, this application is not entirely correct.

The authorship of the term is attributed to the contemporary writer and publicist Fiodar Jeŭłašoŭski (Jeŭłašeŭski). In the Soviet propagandist literature, the authorship of the term had been sometimes incorrectly attributed to the "Belarusian bourgeois nationalists" (Soviet post-1920s political label for the non-Soviet Belarusian national activists), notably to Vacłaŭ Łastoŭski.

== See also ==
- Litvin
- Litvinism
