= Musicians in Ming China =

Musicians under China's Ming dynasty had a diverse status and many musicians had low social positions. At the same time, musicians could also enjoy great status, like in the case of the emperor Hongzhi who was very well known for being a proponent of music. Most musicians however, were not part of imperial or gentry family and Ming music culture was characterized by four distinct but closely interrelated subcultures. These were the court, literati, religious, and commoner music subcultures. The lives of these different types of musicians were incredibly different, but songs were a shared art form that demonstrated the ideals of both the elites and commoners.

== Elite musicians ==
Remember that the Ming Dynasty spanned hundreds of years! (1368–1644)

=== Literati ===
Officials in Ming used Confucian philosophy in their music playing, and by playing the Qin the literati would better themselves morally with the end goal being to better serve society. Taoists played the qin to become enlightened individuals and become one with nature. Furthermore, qin music was not a form of music that was used by the literati to make money, in essence qin when played by the literati was elevated from the same position most other music had, and it occupied a special role in the lives of these learned officials. Some officials even considered playing virtuousically to be a negative as it took away from the profoundness of playing the qin. The musiking of the literati led to the foundation of music centers in cities around China, like Beijing, Nanjing, Suzhou, or other cities where many scholars visited or lived. These music centers created their own musical subcultures as well, showing how diverse music was in Ming .

=== Emperor ===
The emperor along with their subjects shaped the music culture of Ming China. When emperors used their music to become a part of court institutions and cultural traditions, their rule would become more powerful, like in the case of Emperor Hongwu who directly shaped the foundation of Ming court music. Hongwu Emperor set up four court music offices with the help of his subjects. These four music offices were the State Sacrificial Music Office, the Eunuch Music Office, the Entertainment Music Office, and Palace Women Music Office.

== Common musicians ==
=== Soldiers ===
During the Ming period soldiers were often expected to play music in processions when the Emperor would travel. These soldiers were used by the emperor to demonstrate his power. By having many soldiers following him, the Emperor would put himself in a position of power and the soldiers would be lost in the crowd, being a backdrop for the Emperor rather than being an individual musician exploring their art like the Literati. Being a musician for the military did not change their profession, soldiers were expected to protect the emperor while acting as musicians for the procession. Unlike the Literati, soldiers would play loud instruments like drums and horns rather than delicate instruments like the qin. Their music would be characterized by being very rhythmic and loud in order to show off the qualities of a strong man that they were expected to have.

=== Professional qin performers ===
Unlike the Literati who played the qin, those who made their living off of performing aimed to make the audience feel the beauty, excitement, and emotion of the music. These professional performers compiled and wrote their own pieces for the qin which are still being played in modern times. Although these professional qin players had a different philosophy to music, they still interacted with the Literati. In fact, the Literati often had professional Qin performers as their teachers whom they learned all about the qin from. Furthermore, through interacting with the literati these commoner musicians learned the arts that the literati practiced and they also learned to follow the same philosophy. However, due to the prejudice towards those who used music to make a living these commoner musicians were not well respected by their employers, the literati.

== Female musicians ==
While Confucian scholars disregarded female musicians as improper and they had a disdain for their work, in actuality female musicians were able to rise in the occupation like their male counterparts. Many folk songs are credited to female musicians and were included in the book of odes. Young gentry girls learned to play the qin from their fathers and teachers. In 1530 Shizong Emperor commanded blind female singers to sing the value of female virtues to female virtues to his court ladies. Female musicians were respected, but not allowed to fill the offices of the Court of Imperial Sacrifices because proper music was a male and courtly jobs. To the common man however, female musicians were very well respected and because their music was more interesting than the music of rituals and the state.
