= Aleesha Young =

American professional bodybuilder

- Professional bodybuilder
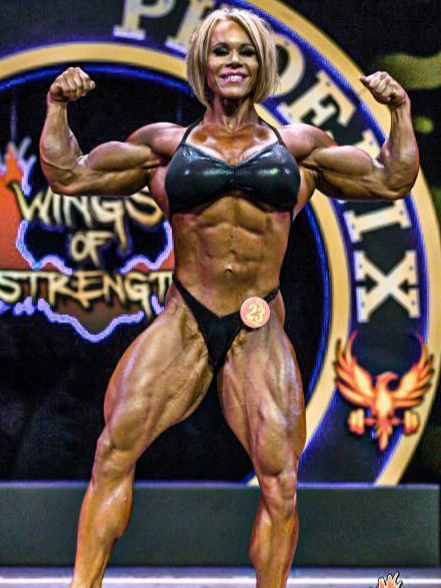
- Young performing a front double biceps pose

Personal info
- Nickname: The World's Strongest Mom
- Born: November 10, 1984 (age 42); Salt Lake City, Utah, U.S.

Best statistics
- Height: 5 ft 3 in (1.60 m)
- Weight: 190 lb (86 kg)

Professional (Pro) career
- Best win: NPC USA Championships, 2014 IFBB Wings of Strength Chicago Pro Championships, 2019

Aleesha Young (born November 10, 1984) is an American bodybuilder who won the NPC USA Championships in 2014. At her largest, her biceps measured over 18 in (457 mm) and her quads over 28 in (711 mm).

Young comes from an athletic family. Her father is a retired bodybuilding competitor, her brother plays American football and ice hockey, and her sister plays ice hockey. Young herself first trained in softball, cheerleading, basketball and soccer, and only at the age of 15 did she begin bodybuilding, alongside her father.

== Contest history ==
- 2008 NPC National Bodybuilding & Figure Championships – 15th
- 2009 NPC USA Bodybuilding & Figure Championships – 7th
- 2011 NPC USA Championships – 8th
- 2014 NPC USA Championships – 1st
- 2014 IFBB Wings of Strength PBW Tampa Pro – 9th
- 2015 IFBB Wings of Strength PBW Tampa Pro – 9th
- 2015 IFBB WOS Rising Phoenix World Championships – 6th
- 2017 IFBB WOS Rising Phoenix World Championships – 6th and Most Muscular award
- 2019 Chicago Pro Championships - 1st
- 2019 IFBB WOS Rising Phoenix World Championships - 10th
- 2020 IFBB WOS Rising Phoenix World Championships - 4th

== Personal life ==
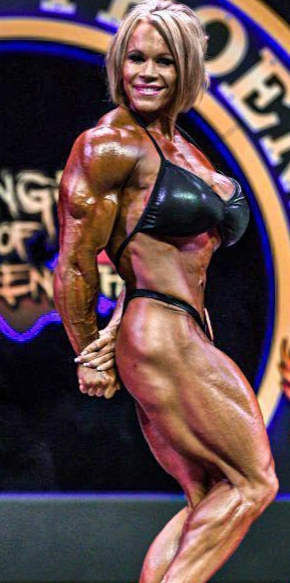
Young flexing triceps at the Wings of Strength

Young lives near her hometown of Salt Lake City. She is divorced and has a daughter named Olivia.

In May 2024, Young was charged with making a false threat she blamed on her ex-husband.
