= Reign of Ren and Xuan =

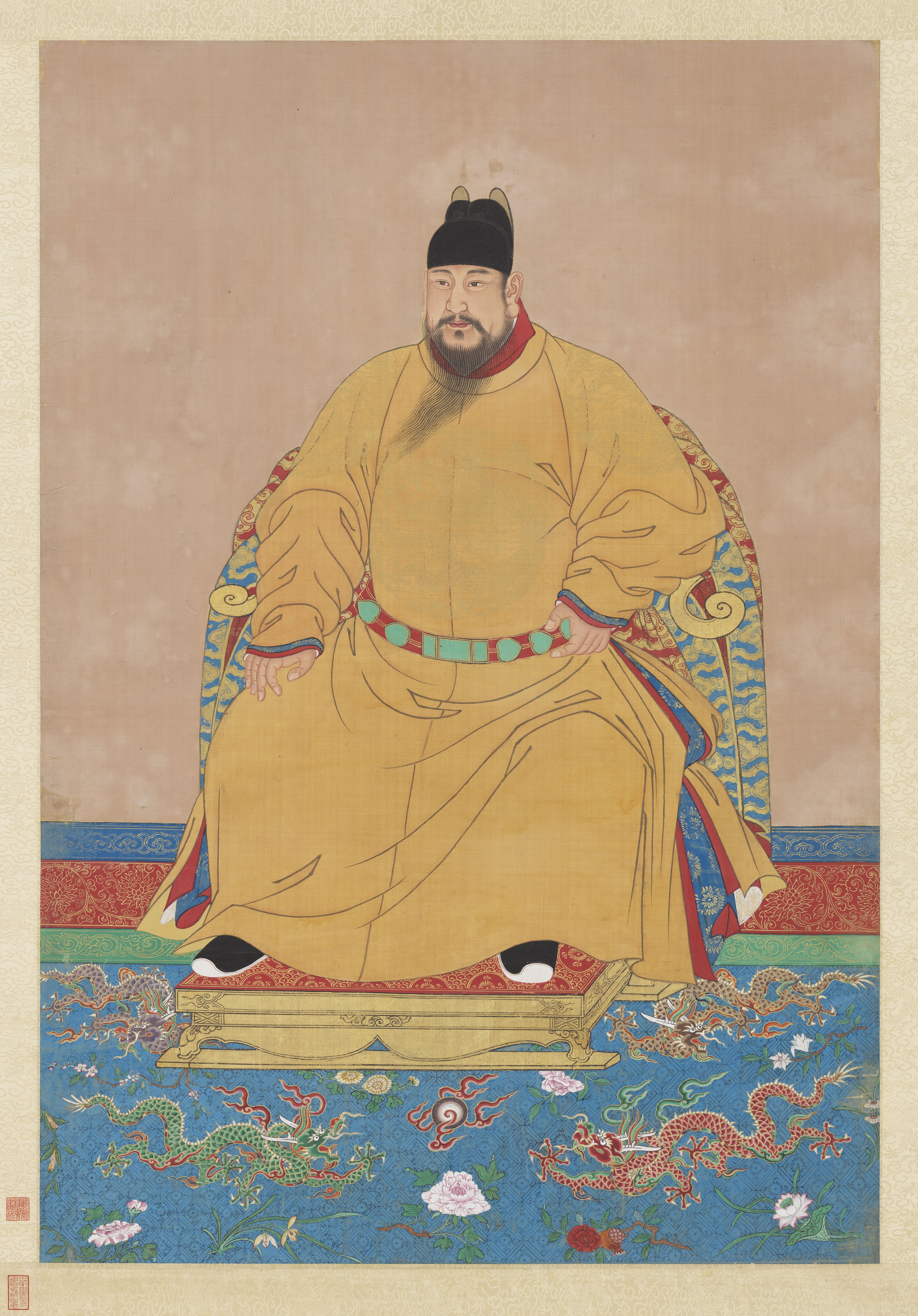
Hongxi Emperor (Emperor Renzong)

Xuande Emperor (Emperor Xuanzong)

After the "Prosperous Age of Yongle" (永樂盛世), the Reign of Ren and Xuan made the ruling base of the Ming dynasty more stable

The Reign of Ren and Xuan (Chinese: 仁宣之治; pinyin: Rén Xuān Zhīzhì; lit. 'Governance during the reigns of Renzong and Xuanzong') refers to the reigns of the Hongxi Emperor and the Xuande Emperor, during which they adopted the policy of Jian Yi (蹇義), the Grand Secretaries Yang Shiqi (楊士奇), Yang Pu (楊溥), Yang Yong (楊榮) (the Three Yangs, 三楊), Xia Yuanji, and of loosely governing the country and resting troops to support the people. This made the eleven-year period of their reign (1424–1435) an era of clarity in the administration of officials, economic development, and social stability in Ming history.
