= Golden age of cosmology =

The golden age of cosmology is a term often used to describe the period from 1992 to the present in which important advances in observational cosmology have been made. Prior to the golden age of cosmology, the understanding of the universe was limited to what scientists could observe through telescopes and other instruments. Theories and models were developed based on limited data and observations, and there was much speculation and debate regarding the true nature of the universe.

The golden age of cosmology has also seen the development of new observational techniques and technologies. For example, the use of telescopes in space has revolutionized our ability to observe the universe. Space-based observatories such as the Hubble Space Telescope (launched in 1990) and the James Webb Space Telescope (launched in 2021) have provided stunning images and data that have expanded our understanding of the universe.

In addition, ground-based telescopes have also undergone significant improvements in recent years. For example, the Atacama Large Millimeter Array (ALMA) in Chile is a revolutionary new telescope that is able to observe the universe in unprecedented detail. It has already made significant contributions to our understanding of star formation and the early universe.

== Lambda-CDM model ==
In 1992, however, the situation changed dramatically with the launch of the Cosmic Background Explorer (COBE) satellite. This mission was designed to study the cosmic microwave background (CMB) radiation, which is the leftover radiation from the Big Bang. The COBE mission made the first precise measurements of the CMB, and these measurements provided evidence in support of the Big Bang theory. The COBE mission also discovered small fluctuations in the CMB radiation, which were believed to be the seeds of galaxy formation. This discovery was a major breakthrough in our understanding of the early universe, as it provided evidence for the inflationary universe model. This model suggests that the universe underwent a rapid expansion in the first few moments after the Big Bang, which would have caused the tiny fluctuations in the CMB.

In the years following the COBE mission, there were several other important discoveries in observational cosmology. One of the most significant was the discovery of dark matter. This mysterious substance makes up approximately 27% of the universe, yet it cannot be observed directly. Its existence was inferred from its gravitational effects on visible matter.

The discovery of dark matter was followed by the discovery of dark energy, which makes up approximately 68% of the universe. Dark energy is believed to be responsible for the accelerated expansion of the universe, which was first observed in 1998 by two independent teams of astronomers.

The discovery of dark matter and dark energy, along with the observations of the CMB and the large-scale structure of the universe, have led to the development of the Lambda-CDM model of the universe. This model suggests that the universe is composed of approximately 5% ordinary matter, 27% dark matter, and 68% dark energy.

== Cosmic inflation ==
In addition to these discoveries, there have been numerous other important advances in observational cosmology in recent years. For example, the Planck satellite, which was launched in 2009, made even more precise measurements of the CMB radiation than the COBE mission. These measurements provided even more evidence in support of the cosmic inflation and helped to refine our understanding of the universe's initial conditions.

== Gravitational waves ==
Another significant development in recent years has been the discovery of gravitational waves. These ripples in the fabric of spacetime were predicted by Albert Einstein's theory of general relativity, but it was not until 2015 that they were first detected. This discovery was made by the Laser Interferometer Gravitational-Wave Observatory (LIGO) and confirmed a major prediction of general relativity.
