= List of periods of regional peace =

The word "pax" together with the Latin name of an empire or nation is used to refer to a period of peace or at least stability, enforced by a hegemon, a so-called Pax imperia ("Imperial peace").

The following is a list of periods of regional peace, sorted into alphabetical order. The corresponding hegemon is stated in parentheses.

- Pax Americana (United States)
- Pax Assyriaca (Neo-Assyrian Empire)
- Pax Atomica (Nuclear-armed States)
- Pax Austriaca (House of Habsburg)
- Pax Britannica (British Empire)
- Pax Europaea (European Union)
- Pax Gupta (Gupta Empire)
- Pax Hispanica (Spanish Empire)
- Pax Khazarica (Khazar Khaganate)
- Pax Kushana (Kushan Empire)
- Pax Mafiosa／Pax Narcotica (Criminal Empires)
- Pax Mongolica／Pax Tatarica (Mongol Empire)
- Pax Nicephori (Byzantine Empire)
- Pax Ottomana (Ottoman Empire)
- Pax Romana (Roman Empire)
- Pax Russica (Russian Empire)
- Pax Sinica (China)
- Pax Sovietica (Soviet Union)
- Pax Sumerica (Neo-Sumerian Empire)
- Pax Syriana (Syrian Arab Republic)

== See also ==
- Regional hegemony
- Hypothetical Axis victory in World War II
- Peace § Long periods
- Pacification
- African Renaissance
- Peace of the Church
- Little Peace of the Church
