= Perpetual Peace (disambiguation) =

Perpetual Peace or Eternal Peace may refer to:

- Perpetual peace, a concept in Kantian philosophy
- Perpetual Peace: A Philosophical Sketch by Immanuel Kant

Treaty of Perpetual Peace and similar may refer to:

- Egyptian–Hittite peace treaty, instituting an "eternal peace" between the Hittite and Egyptian empires.
- Perpetual Peace (532) (ἀπέραντος εἰρήνη), signed between the Byzantine and the Sassanid empires
- Ewiger Landfriede, a pax perpetua agreed at the Diet of Worms in 1495, which banned the right of vendetta in the Holy Roman Empire.
- Treaty of Perpetual Peace (1502), between England and Scotland
- Perpetual Peace (1516), signed between the Old Swiss Confederacy and Francis I of France
- Treaty of Perpetual Peace (1534), between England and Scotland
- Treaty of Perpetual Peace (1686), signed between the Tsardom of Russia and the Polish-Lithuanian Commonwealth.
- Entente Cordiale (1904), an agreement consisting of a number of treaties that were intended to create perpetual peace between United Kingdom and France.

== See also ==
- Pax (liturgy)
- Rest in peace
- Eternal Rest
- Pax Romana
- List of periods of regional peace
- Chang'an, traditional name of the Chinese city of Xi'an, meaning perpetual peace
