= Pax Europaea =

Term for post-WWII European history

Historic enlargement of the EU and its predecessors

Pax Europaea (English: the European peace – after the historical Pax Romana) is the period of relative peace experienced by Europe following World War II, in which there were notably few international conflicts or wars between European states. This peace has often been associated with the creation of NATO, the European Union (EU), and the predecessor institutions of the EU including the European Economic Community. This era of relative peace has been broadly maintained following the end of the Cold War and the Dissolution of the Soviet Union, with the major exceptions of the Yugoslav Wars, The Troubles in Northern Ireland, and various tensions and wars involving or within Russia (including the 2022 Russian invasion of Ukraine).

== History ==
Transatlantic cooperation and European integration was designed to maintain the fragile peace that was created in Europe after World War II. With the continent repeatedly falling into war over the past centuries the creation of the European Communities in the 1950s set to integrate its members to such an extent that war between them would be impossible. Meanwhile, the North Atlantic Treaty Organisation formed as defensive military alliance among western European countries with the U.S. and Canada, to deter aggression both within and from without. The European Communities evolved into the European Union, and both it and NATO expanded to cover most of Western Europe, Northern Europe and Southern Europe. Although Central and Eastern Europe remained under Soviet influence as members of the Warsaw Pact, they too experienced little conflict, with the major exception of internal repression, until the 1990s when a series of wars in Yugoslavia broke out as the country disintegrated. The EU was criticised for its inability to prevent the conflict, though the zone is now within its sphere of enlargement.

By 2020, the EU comprised 27 countries, with the majority of European non-member states seeking membership; twelve countries joined the EU in 2000s. In addition, most European countries which remain outside the EU are tied to it by economic agreements and treaties such as the European Economic Area. Although a number of former Soviet republics have joined the EU, or have taken steps to align themselves with various European organisations, Russia has maintained a level of independence from European institutions. Within the EEA, there have been no military conflict since 1945, making it the longest period of peace on the western European mainland since the Pax Romana. Even though a number of armed conflicts occurred on the European peninsula after World War II, none of them have been between members of the European Union. Most of these conflicts have taken place in the former Yugoslavia and Soviet Union.

The European Union was awarded the 2012 Nobel Peace Prize in recognition of its efforts to maintain and actively foster peace within its borders as well as internationally through diplomatic means.

=== Prior to WWI ===
The congress of Vienna had brought peace to Europe from 1815-1914.

=== List of wars in Europe after WW2 ===
(Note: Armenia, Azerbaijan and Georgia can be considered part of Europe or Western Asia; they are listed here for completeness)

- Anti-Soviet resistance by the Ukrainian Insurgent Army, 1942–1960
- Greek Civil War (Greece, 1946–1949)
- Northern Ireland Conflict, (1960s–1998)
- Basque conflict (1959–2011)
- Cyprus Emergency, (Greek Cypriots (EOKA) vs. United Kingdom, 1955–1959)
- Soviet invasion of Hungary (Soviet Union vs. Hungary, 1956)
- Invasion of Czechoslovakia (Soviet Union vs. Czechoslovakia, 1968)
- Turkish invasion of Cyprus (Cyprus vs. Turkey, 1974)
- Nagorno-Karabakh conflict (Armenia vs. Azerbaijan, 1988–2025)
- Yugoslav Wars, 1991–2001
  - Ten-Day War (Slovenia vs. Yugoslavia, 1991)
  - Croatian War of Independence (Croatia vs. Yugoslavia, 1991–1995)
  - Bosnian War (Bosnia vs. Yugoslavia, 1992–1995)
  - Kosovo War (Kosovo vs. Yugoslavia, 1998–1999)
  - Insurgency in the Preševo Valley (UÇPMB vs. Yugoslavia, 1999–2001)
  - 2001 insurgency in the Republic of North Macedonia (National Liberation Army vs. North Macedonia, 2001)
- Georgian Civil War (Georgia, 1991–1993)
- East Prigorodny conflict (Ingush militia vs. Russia, 1992)
- War of Transnistria (Transnistria vs. Moldova, 1992)
- Chechen–Russian conflict
  - First Chechen War (1994–1996)
  - War of Dagestan (1999)
  - Second Chechen War (1999–2000)
- Albanian Rebellion of 1997 (Albania, 1997)
- Russo-Georgian War (Georgia vs. Russia, 2008)
- Russo-Ukrainian war (2014–present)
  - 2014 pro-Russian unrest in Ukraine
  - Annexation of Crimea by the Russian Federation (2014)
  - War in Donbas (2014–2022)
  - 2022 Russian invasion of Ukraine
- Kumanovo clashes (National Liberation Army vs. North Macedonia, 2015)

=== Wars involving European countries during the post-WW2 period ===
- Indonesian War of Independence (Netherlands)
- Suez Crisis (UK and France)
- First Indochina War (France)
- Algerian War (France)
- Ifni War (France and Spain)
- Bizerte crisis (France)
- Angolan War of Independence (Portugal)
- Dhofar rebellion (UK)
- Guinea-Bissau War of Independence (Portugal)
- Mozambican War of Independence (Portugal)
- Shaba I and II (France and Belgium)
- Falklands War, 1982 (UK)
- Afghanistan War, 2001–2014 (NATO)
- Iraq War, 2003–2011 (UK and Poland)
- Military intervention in Libya, 2011 (NATO)
- Mali War, 2012–2015 (France)
- Central African Republic Civil War (France)

== See also ==
- European integration
- Enlargement of the European Union
  - Future enlargement of the European Union
- Member state of the European Union
- Pax Americana
- Pax Britannica
- Pax Hispanica
- Pax Mongolica
- Pax Romana
- South American Long Peace
