= The End of Pax Americana =

2022 non-fiction book by Naoki Sakai

The End of Pax Americana: The Loss of Empire and Hikikomori Nationalism
- Author: Naoki Sakai
- Language: English
- Subject: Asia-Pacific, Politics, Society, Culture of Japan
- Publisher: Duke University Press
- Publication date: January 14, 2022
- Media type: Print, Digital
- Pages: 368
- ISBN: 978-1478014911

The End of Pax Americana: The Loss of Empire and Hikikomori Nationalism is a non-fiction book by Naoki Sakai. Published in 2022 by Duke University Press as part of their Asia-Pacific series, the books contains a collection of essays, speeches, and other previously published work by Sakai on the topics of nationalism and Pax Americana in Japan. Its title contains a reference to hikikomori, the practise of completely withdrawing oneself from society.

== General references ==
- Kawashima, Ken C. (2023). "The End of Pax Americana: The Loss of Empire and Hikikomori Nationalism by Naoki Sakai (review)". The Journal of Japanese Studies. 49 (2): 481–486. doi:10.1353/jjs.2023.a903485. ISSN 1549-4721.
- Jackson, Steven (2023-05-04). "The end of Pax Americana: the loss of empire and hikikomori nationalism". Japanese Studies. 43 (2): 207–209. doi:10.1080/10371397.2023.2209505. ISSN 1037-1397.
