= Pax Mafiosa =

Term for relative peace in organized crime

The Pax Mafiosa (Latin for “Mafioso Peace”) is a term describing a state of relative non-violence in the territories of organized crime groups caused by agreements not to interfere in criminal activities.

The "peace" has been described as a state of relative non-violence. This is generated from an agreement between different competing organized crime groups to not compete in criminal activity and territory, leading to a stable peace. Governmental authorities may also agree to this peace for their citizens, by non-interference in drug trafficking and other criminal activities. Conversely, organized crime groups benefit from reduced competition and risk, and non-harassment of their members and families. There are allegations that notional capture and escapes of organized crime bosses might be ploys to maintain the peace. It has been felt that an increase in violence after a period of peace is due to a change in the status quo, for example, an increase in competition between groups or political interference.

The name is usually used in reference to the Sicilian Mafia and other Italian organized crime groups. The name is modeled on the Latin Pax Romana (English: "Roman Peace"), which was a long period of relative peace in the Roman Empire due to its power and influence. Just as this term led to derivative terms, such as Pax Britannica and Pax Americana, the term Pax Mafiosa has also led to derivative usage. The phrase is sometimes written as Pax Mafioso, however Mafiosa is the grammatically correct and more common variant.

The term Pax Sinaloa (Latin for “Sinaloa Peace”) is used to describe the peace that occurred due to the power of the Sinaloa Cartel during the Mexican drug war. This has also been referred to as the Pax Narcotica (“Narcotic Peace”).
