= Pax Mongolica =

Term for stabilizing effects of Mongol conquest

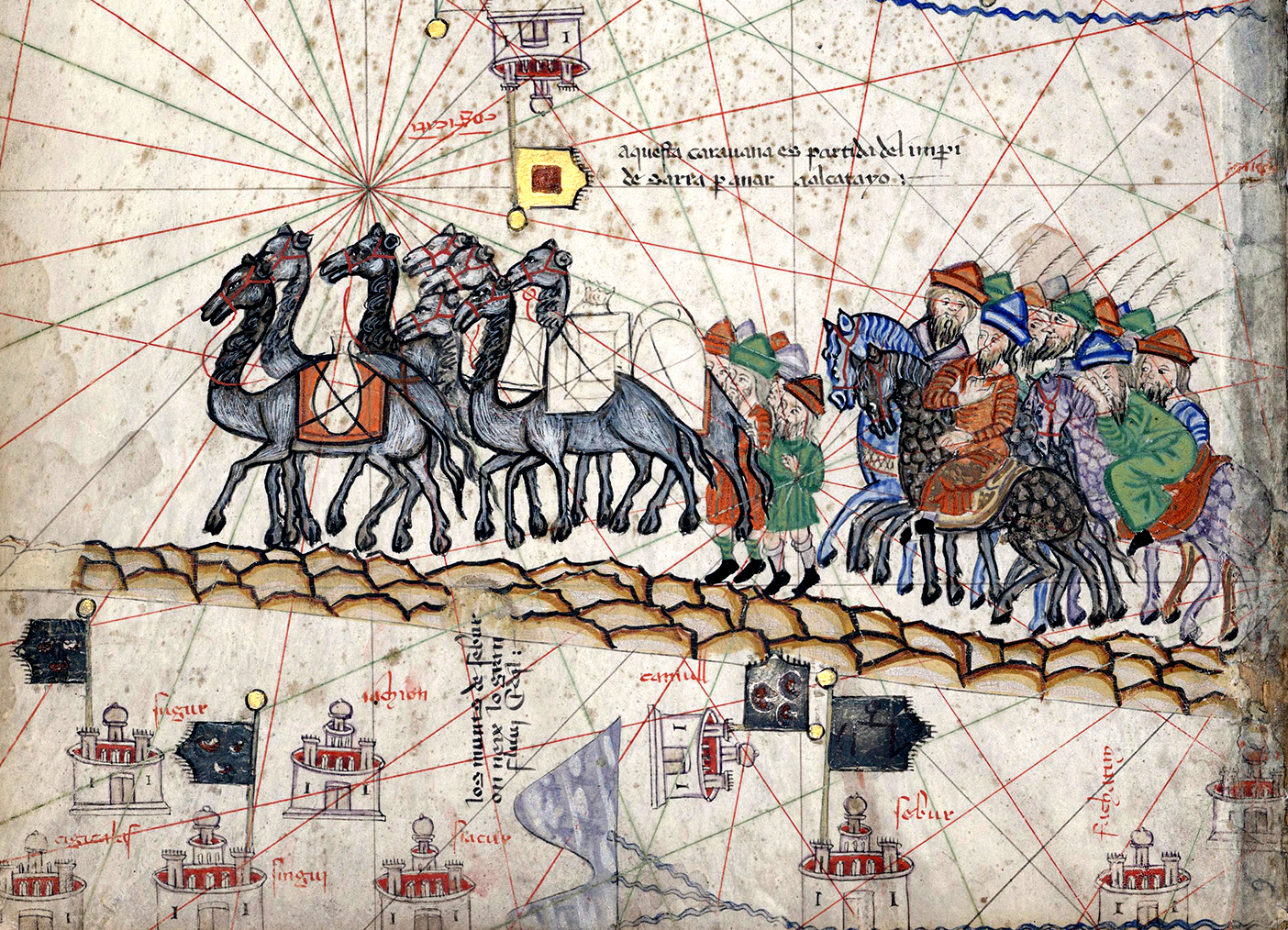
Detail of the Catalan Atlas depicting Marco Polo travelling to the East during the Pax Mongolica

The Pax Mongolica (Latin for 'Mongol Peace'), less often known as Pax Tatarica ('Tatar Peace'), is a historiographical term modeled after the original phrase Pax Romana which describes the stabilizing effects of the conquests of the Mongol Empire on the social, cultural and economic life of the inhabitants of the vast Eurasian territory that the Mongols conquered in the 13th and 14th centuries. The term is used to describe the eased communication and commerce that the unified administration helped to create and the period of relative peace that followed the Mongols' vast and violent conquests.

The conquests of Genghis Khan (r. 1206–1227) and his successors spanned from Southeast Asia to Eastern Europe. The Silk Road, connecting trade centres across Asia and Europe, came under the sole rule of the Mongol Empire. It was commonly said that "a maiden bearing a nugget of gold on her head could wander safely throughout the realm". Despite the political fragmentation of the Mongol Empire into four khanates (Yuan dynasty, Golden Horde, Chagatai Khanate, and Ilkhanate), nearly a century of conquest and civil war was followed by relative stability in the early 14th century. The end of the Pax Mongolica was marked by the disintegration of the khanates and the outbreak of the Black Death in Asia which spread along trade routes to much of the world in the mid-14th century.

During this time, Mongol elements including the ʼPhags-pa script made numerous appearances in Western art.

== Mongol expansion ==
The expansion of the Mongol Empire

Pax Mongolica followed the wake of conquests by the Mongol Empire beginning with Genghis Khan in the early 13th century. In the process of conquering the various tribes in the region, Genghis Khan revolutionised the way Mongolian tribal society was structured. After each new victory, more and more people were incorporated under Genghis Khan's rule, thus diversifying the societal balance of the tribe. In 1203, Genghis Khan, in an effort to strengthen his army, ordered a reform that reorganised his army's structure while breaking down the traditional clan- and kindred-based divisions that had previously fragmented the society and military. He arranged his army into arbans (inter-ethnic groups of ten), and the members of an arban were commanded to be loyal to one another regardless of ethnic origin. Ten arbans made a zuun, or a company; ten zuuns made a myangan, or a battalion; and ten myangans formed a tumen, or an army of 10,000. This decimal system organisation of Genghis Khan's strong military would prove very effective in conquering, by persuasion or force, the many tribes of the central Asian steppe, but it would also strengthen Mongol society as a whole. By 1206, Genghis Khan's military expansion had unified the tribes of Mongolia, and in the same year he was elected and acclaimed as the leader of Mongolia.

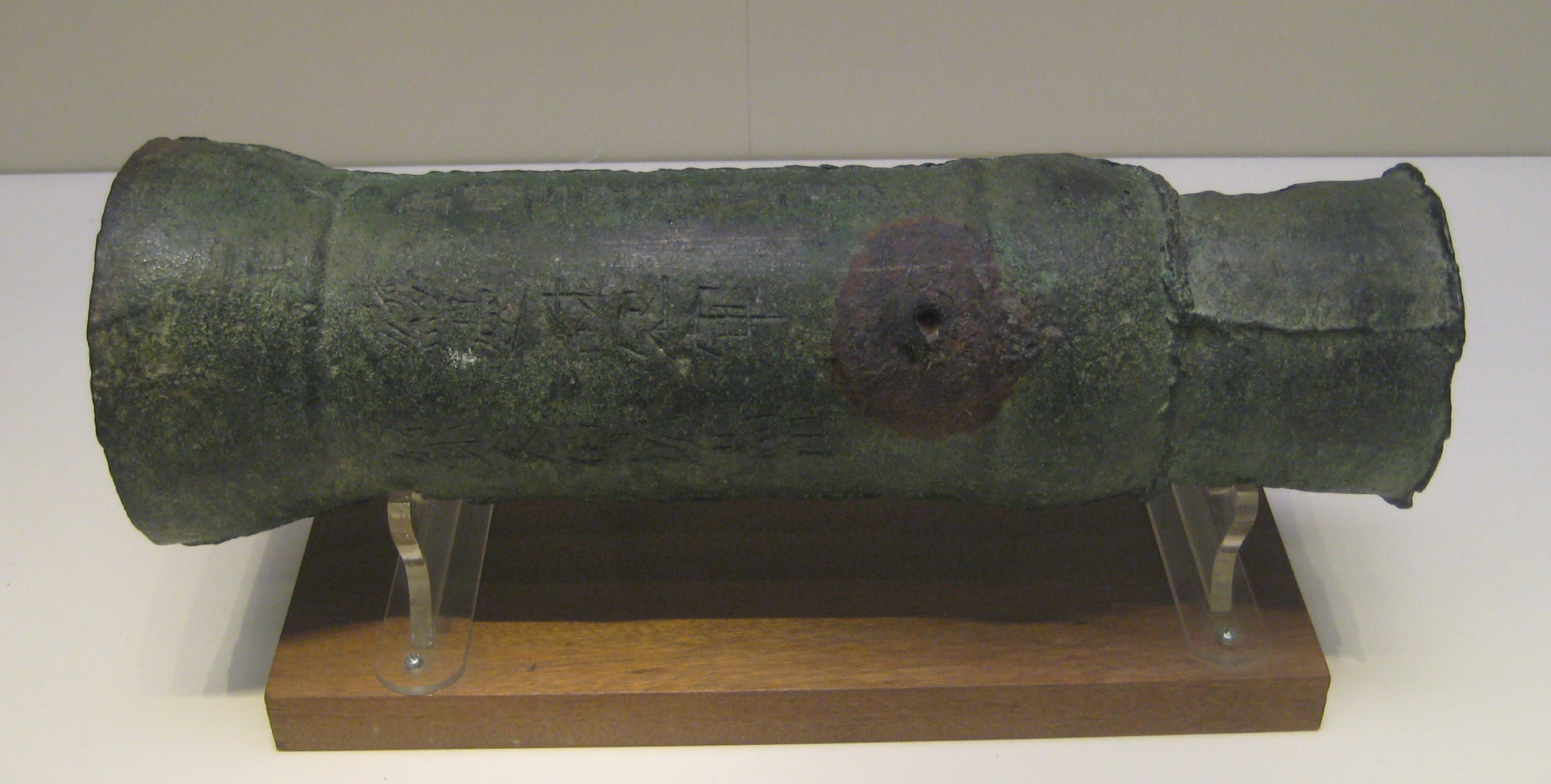
Bronze cannon with inscription dated the third year of the Zhiyuan era (1332). Yuan dynasty (1206–1368). Discovered at the Yunju Temple, Fangshan, Beijing, 1935.

The new Mongol empire quickly moved to annex more territory. The first Mongol conquests were campaigns against the Western Xia. In 1209, the Mongols conquered the Western Xia. Between 1213 and 1214, the Mongols conquered the Jin Empire, and by 1214, the Mongols had captured most of the land north of the Yellow River. In 1221, Mongol generals Jebe and Subutai began their expedition around the Caspian Sea and into Kievan Rus'; Genghis Khan defeated Turkic Jalal al-Din Mangburni at the Battle of the Indus; the Khwarazmian Empire were defeated that same year. In 1235, the Mongols successfully invaded Korea. Two years later in 1237, Batu Khan and Subutai began their conquest of Rus'; they invaded Poland and Hungary in 1241. In 1252, the Mongols began their invasion of Song China; they would seize the capital of Hangzhou in 1276. In 1258, Hulegu Khan captured Baghdad.

Each new victory gave the Mongols the chance to incorporate new people, especially foreign engineers and labourers, into their society. Each new conquest also acquired new trade routes and the opportunity to control taxation and tribute. Thus, through territorial expansion, the Mongol Nation not only became an empire, but also became more technologically and economically advanced.

== Trade network ==
Yuan dynasty banknote with its printing wood plate, 1287 CE

At its height, the Mongolian empire stretched from Busan in the east to Budapest in the west, from Lithuania in the north to Vietnam in the south. This meant that an extremely large part of the continent was united under one political authority. As a result, the trade routes used by merchants became safe for travel, resulting in an overall growth and expansion of trade from China in the east to Britain in the west. Thus, the Pax Mongolica greatly influenced many civilizations in Eurasia during the 13th and 14th centuries.

Under the Mongols new technologies and commodities were exchanged across the Old World, particularly Eurasia. Thomas T. Allsen noted many personnel exchanges occurred during the Mongol period. There were many significant developments in economy (especially trade and public finance), military, medicine, agriculture, cuisine, astronomy, printing, geography, and historiography, which were not limited to Eurasia but also included North Africa.

=== World trade system: the Silk Road ===
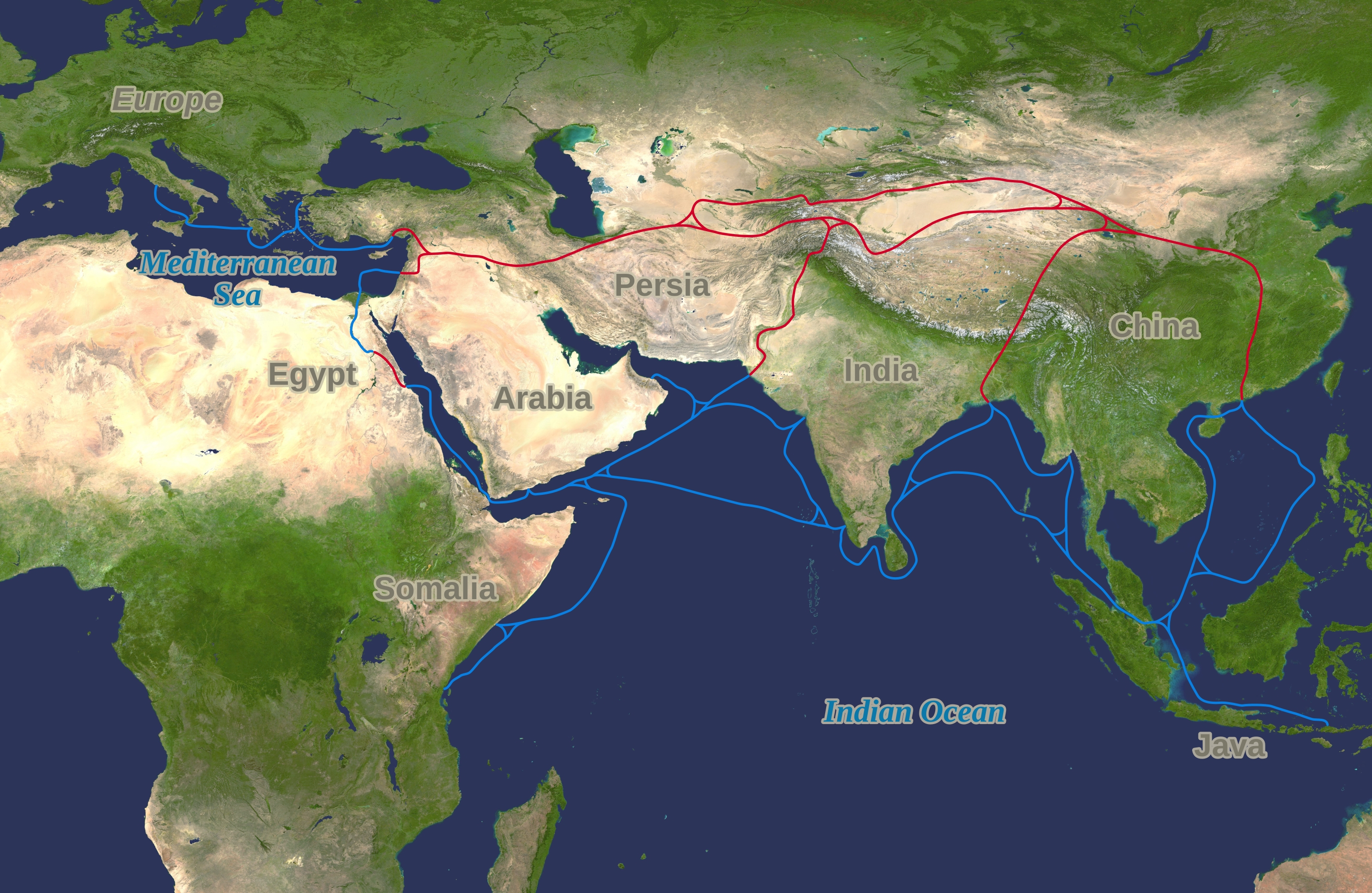
The Silk Road was a system of trade routes connecting East and West

The 13th-century world system

Before the Mongols' rise, the Old World system consisted of isolated imperial systems. The new Mongol empire amalgamated the once isolated civilizations into a new continental system, and re-established the Silk Road as a dominant method of transportation. The unification of Eurasia under the Mongols greatly diminished the number of competing tribute gatherers throughout the trade network and assured greater safety and security in travel. During the Pax Mongolica, European merchants like Marco Polo made their way from Europe to China on the well-maintained and well travelled roads that linked Anatolia to China.

On the Silk Road caravans with Chinese silk; pepper, ginger, cinnamon, and nutmeg came to the West from the Spice Islands via the transcontinental trade routes. Eastern diets were introduced to Europeans as well. Indian muslins, cottons, pearls, and precious stones were sold in Europe, as well as weapons, carpets, and leather goods from Iran. Gunpowder was also introduced to Europe from China. In the opposite direction, Europeans sent silver, fine cloth, horses, linen, and other goods to the near and Far East. Increasing trade and commerce meant that the respective nations and societies increased their exposure to new goods and markets, thus increasing the GDP of each nation or society that was involved in the trade system. Μany of the cities participating in the 13th century world trade system grew rapidly in size.

Along with land trade routes, a Maritime Silk Road contributed to the flow of goods and establishment of a Pax Mongolica. This Maritime Silk Road started with short coastal routes in Southern China. As technology and navigation progressed these routes developed into a high-seas route into the Indian Ocean. Eventually these routes further developed encompassing the Arabian Sea, Persian Gulf, Red Sea, and the sea off East Africa.

Along with tangible goods, people, techniques, information, and ideas moved lucidly across the Eurasian landmass for the first time. For example, John of Montecorvino, archbishop of Beijing founded Roman Catholic missions in India and China and also translated the New Testament into the Mongolian language. Long-distance trade brought new methods of doing business from the Far East to Europe; bills of exchange, deposit banking, and insurance were introduced to Europe during the Pax Mongolica. Bills of exchange made it significantly easier to travel long distances because a traveller would not be burdened by the weight of metal coins.

Islamic methods of mathematics, astronomy, and science made their way to Africa, East Asia, and Europe during the Pax Mongolica. Methods of paper-making and printing made their way from China to Europe. Rudimentary banking systems were established, and money changing and credit extension were common, resulting in large amounts of merchant wealth.

=== Mongol administration ===
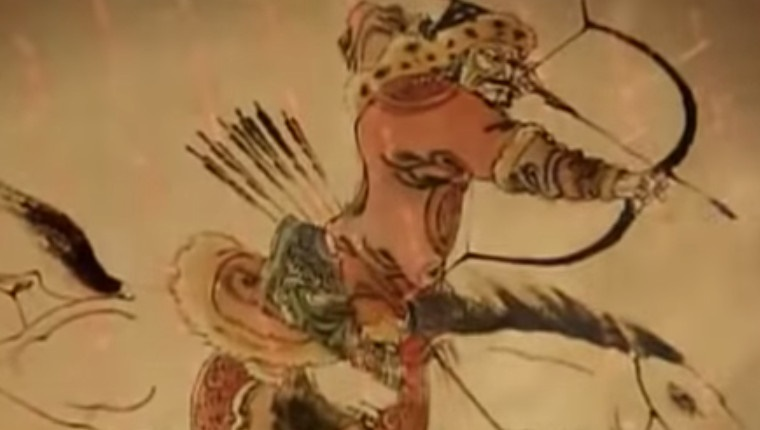
Mongol warrior on horseback, preparing a mounted archery shot

Mongolia's central geographical position on the Asian continent was an important reason why it was able to play such a large role in the trade system. The Mongol army was easily able to assert strong rule throughout most of the empire. The military ensured that supply lines and trade routes flowed smoothly; permanent garrisons were established along trade routes to protect the travelers on these routes. Complex local systems of taxation and extortion that were prevalent before Mongol rule were abolished to ensure the smooth flow of merchants and trade through the empire. A system of weights-and-measures was also standardised. To make the voyage on the trade routes less harrowing, the Mongols went as far as to plant trees along the roads to shade the merchants and travelers in the summer months; stone pillars were used to mark the roads where trees could not grow.

The Mongols sought alliances with other nations and societies to ensure the flow of trade through the empire. The Mongol army was also used to reshape and streamline the flow of trade through the continent by destroying cities on the less-important or more inaccessible routes. The Mongol military was mostly made up of cavalrymen. This allowed the military to move swiftly and easily over large distances.

The Mongols developed the concepts of liability in relation to investments and loans in Mongol–ortoq partnerships, promoting trade and investment to facilitate the commercial integration of the Mongol Empire. In Mongol times, the contractual features of a Mongol-ortoq partnership closely resembled that of qirad and commenda arrangements, however, Mongol investors used metal coins, paper money, gold and silver ingots and tradable goods for partnership investments and primarily financed money-lending and trade activities. Moreover, Mongol elites formed trade partnerships with merchants from Central and Western Asia and Europe, including Chinese and Marco Polo's family.

The code of Mongol law, known as the Yassa ("Great Law"), decreed strict rules and punishments in many areas of the Mongolian Empire's society, especially those areas concerning trade and commerce. The Yassa helped suppress the traditional causes of tribal feuding and war, thus helping to ensure a peaceful trading and traveling environment. Theft and animal rustling were outlawed, and the Mongol Empire under Genghis Khan even established a massive lost-and-found system. Harsh penalties including a retribution of nine times the original value of stolen goods helped deter theft on Mongol roads. The Yassa also decreed complete religious freedom, ensuring that Buddhists, Muslims, Christians, etc., were all allowed to travel freely throughout the empire; religious leaders were also exempted from taxation, as were doctors, lawyers, undertakers, teachers, and scholars. The Yassa did allow for flexibility and it usually adapted, absorbed, or built upon legal systems in remote parts of the empire, thus maintaining a level of openness to various societies and ensuring peace and stability.

In order to ensure Mongol law was enforced, a hierarchy of legal administration was developed. This was headed by the Secretarial Council "chung-shu-sheng" (中書省) of the central government which oversaw 10 provincial governments known as "hsing-sheng" (行省). The Xingsheng was further split into smaller districts which handled legal cases. A police commissioner known as "hsien wei" (縣委) was entrusted with law enforcement and had the authority to arrest suspects. This method of federalising the empire made it easier and more efficient for laws to be administered throughout the continent.

=== Postal system ===
The Mongols established the Yam (Mongolian: Өртөө, Örtöö, checkpoint), the first system of communication that connected the Far East and the West. Relay stations were set up every 25–30 miles or an average day's journey on horse. These stations were introduced by Ögedei Khan in 1234 and supplied fresh horses and fodder. His brothers Chagatai Khan and Tolui and his nephew Batu Khan further extended this network.

The Mongol army administered the Yam. The Yam stretched across Mongol territory from Eastern Europe to the Pacific Ocean. The routes were well organised, funded, maintained, and administered by the Mongols. This highly sophisticated system of communication and travel made it relatively easy to send important messages and travel long distances in relatively short amounts of time. As a result of the relatively lucid communication and ease of movement, the Mongols were able to govern their vast empire effectively, thereby ensuring political and economic stability.

== Decline ==
The decline of Pax Mongolica was a result of a number of factors: incompetent and rivaling leaders, corruption, revolts, decadence, factional struggles, assassinations, external attacks, and disease. The decline of the Pax Mongolica resulted in a decline of eased trade between East and West.

=== Decline of Mongol rule ===
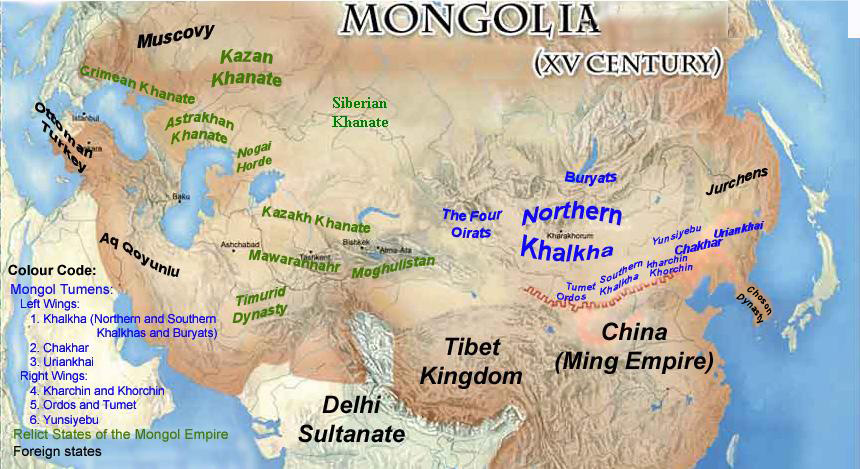
Mongol residual states and domains by the 15th century

The Mongol Empire, near the time of its decline, consisted of many different territories. Each territory was defined as a "khanate". Due to the isolation of the Mongolian world, many rulers in the 14th century started to focus on their own khanates.

Religious intolerance was one particular factor in the decline of the Pax Mongolica. In Rus', the Mongols (known as the Golden Horde), gradually lost power and territory due to intolerance specifically geared towards different religions. The Rus' Mongols converted to Islam and joined the Egyptian Mamluks for political reasons. At one point in the war, the Golden Horde even fought the Persian Mongols. The eastern part of the Golden Horde, White Horde, had friendly relations with the Ilkhanate and the Great Khan. The decentralisation occurred because communication was so difficult due to the collapsing trade system and the rivalry between Mongol princes. Eventually, the Persian Mongol leader Ghazan converted to Islam in 1295. This contributed to the growing power of Nawruz; a Muslim Oirat general.

In China, descendants of Kublai Khan claimed the Mongols weakened their power by becoming "too Chinese". This led to Yuan emperors separating themselves from their subjects in order to stress their Mongol identity and to reject their Chinese culture. Kublai Khan once promoted Chinese culture and the importance of its practice but under the Yuan emperors this was prohibited. As the Chinese culture was changing, intolerance became more common. Some Chinese thought that the Mongols were planning to kill Chinese children and perform sexual rituals on them. As a result many Chinese became xenophobic towards the Mongols. This xenophobia led Chinese rulers to expel the Mongols from China and form the Ming dynasty.

=== Bubonic plague ===
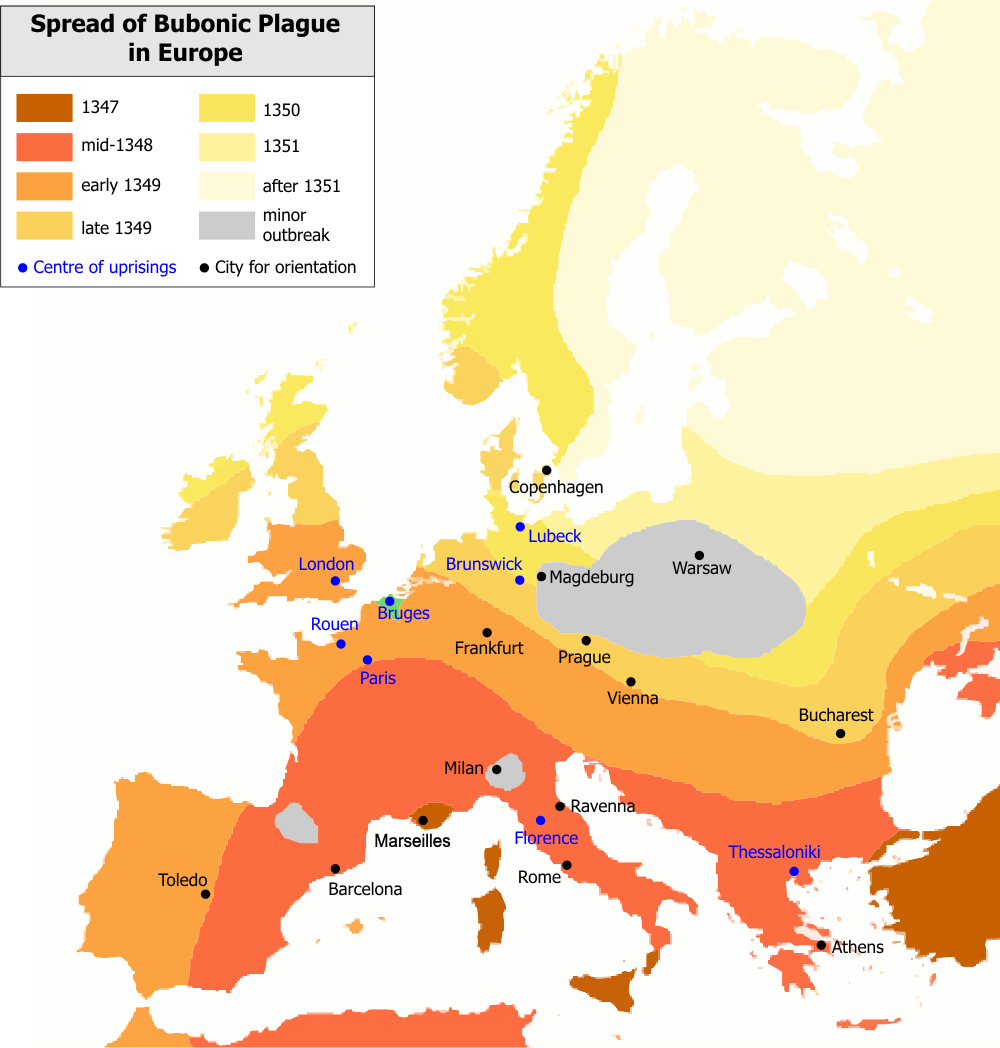
The spread of the Black Death in Europe; it was introduced to Europe from Asia

The segregation and fragmentation of the respective khanates in the Mongol Empire were not the only factors in contributing to the decline of the Pax Mongolica. The outbreak of bubonic plague, or Black Death, also played a devastating role in the decline of the Pax Mongolica. Because the Mongol Empire bridged once isolated regions, it made it easy for the Black Death to spread rapidly. Historian William H. McNeill has noted that the plague was transferred from ground rodents living in southern Chinese and Burmese Himalayan foothills to Mongol soldiers when they invaded the area in 1252. In 1331 the plague was noted in China, and from East Asia it was carried west along the trade routes by merchants and Mongol soldiers who were able to so freely and quickly travel across the continent during the Pax Mongolica. Plague-infected fleas hitched rides in the manes of horses, on the hair of camels, or on black rats that nestled in cargoes or in saddlebags. The Black Death is estimated to have killed one-third of China's population and 25-50% of Europe's population.

Demographically weakened, the Mongols were not able to exert their rule over remote domains in their empire, which began to revolt once the plague broke out. These revolts disrupted the production of goods and flow of trade, which ended the Pax Mongolica.

=== Effects on trade ===
Over the next 300 years, China became increasingly isolationist and inward-looking. China prohibited foreigners, foreign trade, and languages other than Chinese. Confucianism and Taoism were reinstated as the national religions, and the Chinese experienced cultural stagnation. During the early years of the Ming dynasty, despite the voyages of Zheng He, trade with the rest of the world overall declined. This is attributed to wars, epidemics and widespread disruptions rather than "symbolic policy change". Economic difficulties also contributed to the decline as an important world trade player. The Black Death quickly spread to the rest of the world trade system, and the long-distance trading that was common and applauded during the Pax Mongolica almost entirely stopped.

== See also ==
- Pax Romana
- Pax Sinica
- Pax Britannica
- Pax Americana
- Pax Ottomana
- Pax Kushana
- Pax Khazarica
- Mongol Empire
- History of cartography
