= Pax Sumerica =

Pax Sumerica, Latin for "the Sumerian peace", was a time of peace during the rule of the Neo-Sumerian Empire during the 22nd and 21 centuries BC. The Sumerian Peace is traditionally considered to have extended until the death of Hammurabi, the 6th king of the first Babylonian Empire c. 1750 BC.
