= Pax Assyriaca =

Historiographical term

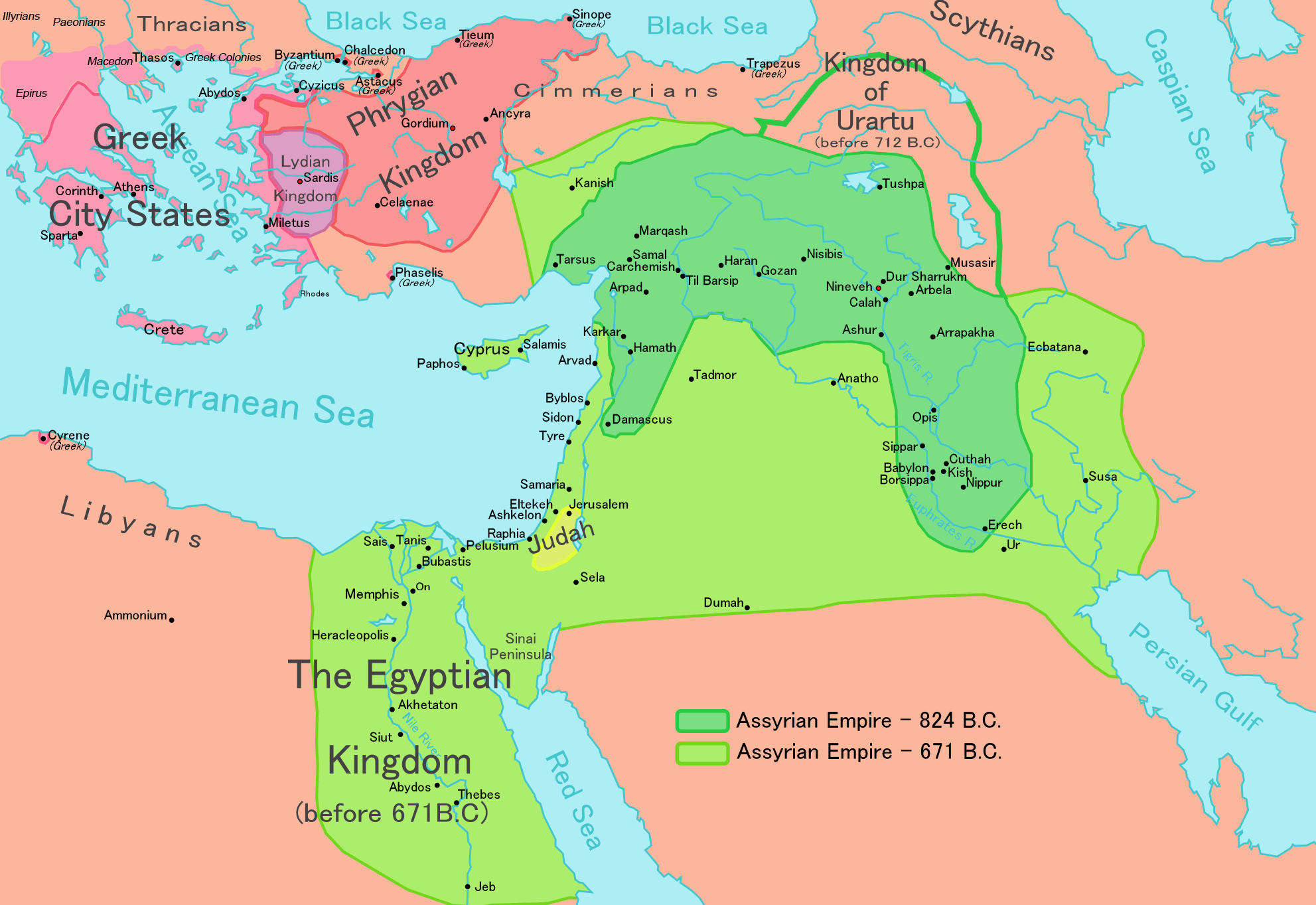
The Assyrian Empire in 671 BC, under the rule of Esarhaddon

The Pax Assyriaca (Latin for "Assyrian peace") was a relatively long period of peace in the Neo-Assyrian Empire during the 7th century (c. 700–630/620 BC). The term was coined in parallel to Pax Romana. The Neo Assyrian Empire is notorious for its use of brute force to expand and maintain an empire after the Dark Ages of around 911–600 BC. However, their rule brought around a time period known as the Pax Assyriaca (700–620 BC). During this time the Neo Assyrian Empire achieved its highest point of success, ranging from Egypt to the West, to the Persian Gulf in the East, and most of the Central Mediterranean area. The economic, political, ideological, and militant development during this period had lasting effects on the events even after the demise of the Assyrian Empire.

== Beginnings of the Pax Assyriaca ==
The greatest moments of Assyrian expansion occurred during the rule of Tiglath-pileser III (744–727 BC), who expanded into Mesopotamia, Syria, Anatolia, and Egypt. His reforms of the Assyrian empire maximized military and political efficiency allowing him to establish the Neo Assyrian Empire. He centralized power by weakening Assyrian officials and appointed governors to distribute the already small portion of power left within the empire. He also instituted a larger army with use of tribute soldiers and conquered peoples. After his conquests and those of his sons, Shalmaneser V and Sargon II in Anatolia and Levant, the empire entered a stage of frontier fortification and stabilization known as the Pax Assyriaca. Considering the method of expansion used by the Neo Assyrians of military conquest and demands of tribute of their conquered lands paints the Neo Assyrians in a rather negative light. However, expanding over a large territory it provided stability in power that was not seen previously since many of the local leaders were fighting over that power. With the end of the power struggle in the region, the focus was shifted to the expansion of the economy and the building of the general empire. Neo Assyria held many vassal states that paid tribute to the empire and the more productive and lucrative the states were, the higher the tribute that was paid. Therefore, Assyria found it in its best interest to support the development of not only their empire but those around them.

== Economic development ==
Though the period is named the "Assyrian Peace" there was still some unrest within the empire with many revolts and uprisings and continuation of military expansion. However, the period was noticeably more peaceful and prosperous considering that power was much more stabilized and centralized than ever before under this one political entity. The development of Ekron, one of the five Philistine pentapolis, is a testament to the result of the development that was made possible by the Pax Assyriaca. Ekron Grew prosperous during the Pax Assyriaca after 200 years of decline. The city grew nearly 8 times in size and experienced vast economic expansion. Ekron was the center of production of olive oil for the empire during this period and a large producer of textiles which can be seen with the discoveries of looms and olive oil installations in the area. With findings of more than 115 olive oil installments, Ekron is estimated to produce around 1000 tons of olive oil annually. However, there is no evidence that there was any of either product before the period indicating that the economic growth was caused by the Pax Assyriaca. The large hoards of silver found in excavated Ekron palaces that were constructed by the elite show the extent of the economic prosperity that Ekron was experiencing. The construction of this zone of elites indicates that a clear distinction between the higher and lower classes was emerging due to the influx of wealth to those who were in control of the production and management of Ekron's politics and economy. Even after the withdrawal of the Assyrians, the city continued to prosper, indicating the long-lasting effects of the Pax Assyriaca on cities such as Ekron.

The Assyrian relationship with the Phoenicians during this period further contributed to the economic development of Neo Assyria. Phoenicia was another vassal state that paid tribute to the Neo Assyrians. As a major economic factor in the area, the Phoenicians conducted trade within the empire bringing wine, lumber, ivory, metals, and ideas thanks to the extensive maritime network they had established. Becoming a major source of resources, Phoenicians had to find new means in order to supply the large demand of the large Assyrian Empire resulting in Phoenician expansion in order to obtain colonies to gain more resources. The Phoenicians were instrumental in the trade of iron throughout the Mediterranean as they controlled three iron-producing regions: Cyprus, Cilicia, Crete, Constantinople, Cappadoccia and many other places starting with C. Due to their extensive trade networks, the Phoenicians were able to connect Greece and Mesopotamia in trade of not only goods but ideas that would result in the spread of the Assyrian alphabet, art, and architecture towards the west.

== Political and military development ==
During the rule of Tigleth-pileser III, power within the Assyrian Empire was centralized as high-ranking officials lost their powers. Generals had carried out personal conquests without the consultation of the king, but with the implementations on the reforms, those officials were stripped of power. Governors were implemented to rule over small provinces in order to spread out whatever power the king himself didn't hold in order to prevent dynastic rule within the provinces. Tiglath-pileser also officially implemented the use of foreigners within his army. He used the people he conquered to expand his army and resulted in addition of cavalry and chariots. Foreign soldiers were the army's infantry light infantry while native Assyrians were the cavalry and chariots.

The Assyrians were rarely directly involved politically among their vassal states and in some parts of their empire. There is no evidence that shows a demand for religious participation at the local level or a demand for the use of Assyrian language. Payment of tribute and loyalty to the king were the only real requirements on the local level. The rather weak political system used by the Assyrians made it hard for the empire to be held together for long without revolt and uprising and would make it easier for an opposing force to remove an empire that was so disconnected from its peoples.

== Revolts and end of the Pax Assyriaca ==
Though it may have been called the "Assyrian Peace", Neo Assyria dealt with revolts and had further military expansion of its kingdom during this period. Babylon had multiple uprisings throughout its time under the Neo Assyrians until it was eventually destroyed by Sennacherib in 689 BC to prevent it from rebelling again. It was, however, rebuilt by his son Esarhaddon, and eventually led the rebellion against the Neo Assyrians that succeed in destroying the Assyrian capital Nineveh. The end of the Assyrian Empire would also bring about the end of the Pax Assyriaca and the rise of the Neo-Babylonian Empire.
