= Treaty of Perpetual Peace (1534) =

Treaty between England and Scotland, 1534

A Treaty of Perpetual Peace was signed in London on 11 May 1534 between representatives of James V of Scotland and Henry VIII of England.
