= Pax Romana =

Roman golden age (27 BC to 180)

The Pax Romana (Latin: [ˈpaːks rɔːˈmaːna]; 'Roman Peace') is a roughly 200-year-long period of ancient Rome that is identified as a golden age of increased and sustained Roman imperialism, prosperous stability, hegemonic power, regional expansion, and relative peace and order, although it still featured a number of internal revolts and external wars, including the Roman–Persian wars. Traditionally, the onset is understood to be the ascent of Augustus, who also founded the Roman principate, in 27 BC. Conversely, the end of the era is considered as 180 AD with the death of Marcus Aurelius, the last of the "Five Good Emperors".

It was during this period that the Roman Empire achieved its greatest territorial extent under Trajan in 117. Additionally, the Roman Empire's population is estimated to have peaked at 70 million people during the Pax Romana, accounting for 33% of the world's population. Following the Pax Romana, and according to Cassius Dio, the tyrannical reign of Commodus, later followed by the Year of the Five Emperors and the Crisis of the Third Century, marked Rome's descent "from a kingdom of gold to one of iron and rust".

== Overview ==
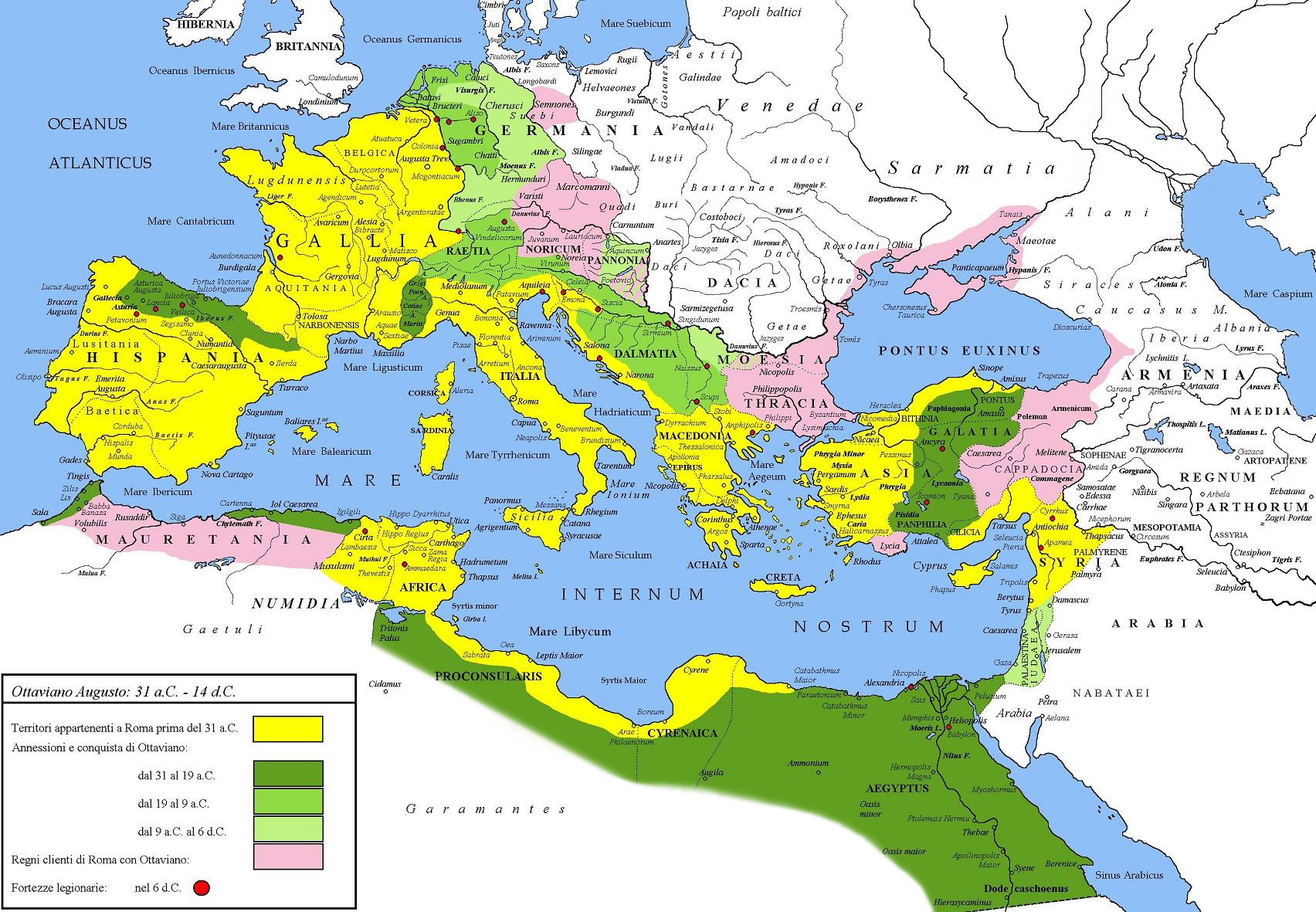
Extent of the Roman Empire under Augustus. Yellow represents the extent of the Republic in 31 BC, while green represents gradually conquered territories under the reign of Augustus, and pink areas represent client states.

The Pax Romana, spanning from 27 BC to AD 180, stands as one of the longest enduring periods of peace in history. However, Walter Goffart wrote: "The volume of the Cambridge Ancient History for the years AD 70–192 is called 'The Imperial Peace', but peace is not what one finds in its pages". On the other hand, Arthur M. Eckstein writes that the period must be viewed in contrast to the much more frequent warfare in the 3rd and 4th centuries BC under the Roman Republic.

Eckstein also notes that the initial Pax Romana appeared during the Republic, and that its temporal span varied upon geographical region as well: "Although the standard textbook dates for the Pax Romana, the famous 'Roman Peace' in the Mediterranean, are 31 BC to AD 250, the fact is that the Roman Peace was emerging in large regions of the Mediterranean at a much earlier date: Sicily after 210 [BC], the Italian Peninsula after 200 [BC]; the Po Valley after 190 [BC]; most of the Iberian Peninsula after 133 [BC]; North Africa after 100 [BC]; and for ever longer stretches of time in the Greek East." Thomas F. Madden explained the dating of 27 BC as avoiding the civil wars of the 1st century BC. The true origins of Pax Romana for him are in the 2nd century BC, after Rome had eliminated all of its serious military rivals and brought an unprecedented peace and prosperity to the lands of their empire. Tim Cornell argued that Pax Romana in the sense of the absence of major inter-state wars began in the Second century BC. Over the course of the last two centuries of the Republic, the character and frequency of these wars declined. Almost continuous warfare in the Fourth and Third centuries BC became sporadic and punctuated by long periods of peace.

The first known record of the term Pax Romana appears in a writing by Seneca the Younger in AD 55. The concept was highly influential, and the subject of theories and attempts to copy it in subsequent ages. Arnaldo Momigliano noted that "Pax Romana is a simple formula for propaganda, but a difficult subject for research."

For most historians, the Pax Romana began when Octavian (Augustus) defeated Mark Antony and Cleopatra in the Battle of Actium on 2 September 31 BC and became Roman emperor. He became princeps, or first citizen. Lacking a good precedent of successful one-man rule, Augustus created a junta of the greatest military magnates and stood as the front man. By binding together these leading magnates in a coalition, he eliminated the prospect of civil war. The Pax Romana was not immediate, despite the end of the civil wars, because fighting continued in Hispania and in the Alps. Nevertheless, Augustus closed the Gates of Janus (a ceremony indicating that Rome was at peace) three times, first in 29 BC and again in 25 BC. The third closure is undocumented, but Inez Scott Ryberg (1949) and Gaius Stern (2006) have persuasively dated the third closure to 13 BC with the commissioning of the Ara Pacis. At the time of the Ludi Saeculares in 17 BC the Concept of Peace was publicized, and in 13 BC was proclaimed when Augustus and Agrippa jointly returned from pacifying Hispania and the Alps. The order to construct the Ara Pacis was probably part of this announcement.

Romans regarded peace not as an absence of war, but as a rare situation which existed when all opponents had been beaten down and lost the ability to resist. Augustus' challenge was to persuade Romans that the prosperity they could achieve in the absence of warfare was better for the Empire than the potential wealth and honor acquired when fighting a risky war. Augustus succeeded by means of skillful propaganda. Subsequent emperors followed his lead, sometimes producing lavish ceremonies to close the Gates of Janus, issuing coins with Pax on the reverse, and patronizing literature extolling the benefits of the Pax Romana.

After Augustus' death in AD 14, most of his successors as Roman emperors continued his politics. The last five emperors of the Pax Romana are known as the "Five Good Emperors".

== Influence on trade ==
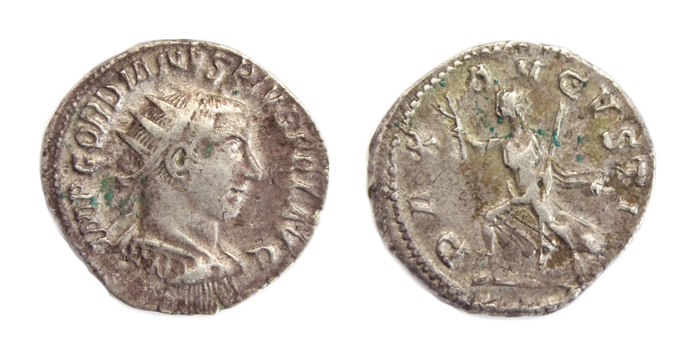
AR Antoninianus of Gordian III, struck at Antioch 243–244 with Pax Augusta on the reverse

Roman trade in the Mediterranean increased during the Pax Romana. Romans sailed East to acquire silks, gems, onyx and spices. Romans benefited from large profits, and incomes in the Roman empire were raised due to trade in the Mediterranean.

As the Pax Romana of the western world by Rome was largely contemporaneous to the Pax Sinica of the eastern world by Han China, long-distance travel and trade in Eurasian history was significantly stimulated during these eras.

Reconstruction drawing of the Basilica Ulpia, Rome, 107-112 AD a great works project of the era

== The spread of Common Law ==
It was during Pax Romana that Jus Gentium began in the empire, the foundational rights that solidified legal principles still used in the modern era, such as "innocent until proven guilty" were propagated through the various towns, villages and hamlets. The awareness and spread of citizenship rights occurred. Circuit courts were established based on a set schedule, reducing the need for citizens to take the law into their own hands.

== Pax imperia: analogous peaces ==
The prominence of the concept of the Pax Romana led to historians coining variants of the term to describe other systems of relative peace that have been established, attempted, or argued to have existed. Some variants include:

- Pax Americana
- Pax Assyriaca
- Pax Atomica
- Pax Britannica
- Pax Europaea
- Pax Guptana
- Pax Hispanica
- Pax Khazarica
- Pax Kushana
- Pax Mafiosa (Pax Narcotica)
- Pax Mongolica
- Pax Ottomana
- Pax Porfiriana
- Pax Sinica
- Pax Sovietica
- Pax Syriana
- Pax Tokugawana

More generically, the concept has been referred to as pax imperia (sometimes misspelled as pax imperium), meaning imperial peace, or—less literally—hegemonic peace. Raymond Aron notes that imperial peace—peace achieved through hegemony can—sometimes, but not always—become civil peace. As an example, the German Empire's imperial peace of 1871 (over its internal components like Saxony) slowly evolved into the later German state. As a counter-example, the imperial peace of Alexander the Great's empire dissolved because the Greek city states maintained their political identity. Aron notes that during the Pax Romana, the First Jewish–Roman War was a reminder that the overlapping of the imperial institutions over the local ones did not erase them and the overlap was a source of tension and flare-ups. Aron summarizes that, "In other words, imperial peace becomes civil peace insofar as the memory of the previously independent political units are effaced, insofar as individuals within a pacified zone feel themselves less united to the traditional or local community and more to the conquering state."

The concept of Pax Romana was highly influential, and there were attempts to imitate it in the Byzantine Empire, and in the Christian West, where it morphed into the Peace and Truce of God (pax Dei and treuga Dei). A theoretician of the imperial peace during the Middle Ages was Dante Aligheri. Dante's works on the topic were analyzed at the beginning of the 20th century by William Mitchell Ramsay in the book The Imperial Peace: An Ideal in European History (1913).

== See also ==
- Imperialism
- Mos maiorum
- Succession of the Roman Empire

== Bibliography ==
- Burton, Paul. 2011. "Pax Romana/Pax Americana: Perceptions of Rome in American Political Culture, 2000–2010". International Journal of Classical Tradition 18.1:66–104. JSTOR 41474687.
- Cornwell, Hannah. 2017. Pax and the Politics of Peace: Republic to Principate. Oxford Classical Monographs. Oxford; New York: Oxford University Press.
- Galinsky, Karl. 2012. Augustus: Introduction to the Life of an Emperor. Cambridge; New York: Cambridge University Press.
- Goldsworthy, Adrian. 2016. Pax Romana: War, Peace and Conquest in the Roman World. New Haven: Yale University Press.
- Hardwick, Lorna. 2000. "Concepts of Peace". In Experiencing Rome: Culture, Identity and Power in the Roman Empire, edited by Janet Huskinson, 335–368. London: Routledge.
- Lopez, Gennaro. 2002. "Pax Romana/Pax Augusta". Invigilata Lucernis 24: 97–110.
- Stern, Gaius. 2015. "The New Cult of Pax Augusta 13 BC–AD 14". Acta Antiqua Academiae Scientiarum Hungaricae 55.1–4: 1–16.
- Yannakopulos, Nikos. 2003. "Preserving the Pax Romana: The Peace Functionaries in Roman East". Mediterraneo Antico 6.2: 825–905.
