= Pax Khazarica =

Historiographical term

Pax Khazarica (Latin for "Khazar Peace") is a historiographical term, modeled after the original phrase Pax Romana, applied to the period (roughly 700–950 AD) during which the Khazar Khaganate dominated the Pontic steppe and the Caucasus Mountains. During this period, Khazar dominion over vital trans-Eurasian trade routes facilitated travel and trade between Europe and Asia by such groups as the Radhanites and the early Rus. The originator of the term is unknown but it was in use by scholars as early as the nineteenth century.

== Bibliography ==
- Barthold, W. (1996). "Khazar". Encyclopaedia of Islam (Brill Online). Eds.: P. Bearman, Th. Bianquis, C.E. Bosworth, E. van Donzel and W.P. Heinrichs. Brill.
- Blind, Karl. "A Forgotten Turkish Nation in Europe". The Gentleman's Quarterly. Vol. CCXLI, No. 19. London: Chatto & Windus, 1877. pp. 439–460.
- Kevin Alan Brook. The Jews of Khazaria. 2nd ed. Rowman & Littlefield Publishers, Inc, 2006.
- Douglas M. Dunlop. The History of the Jewish Khazars, Princeton, N.J.: Princeton University Press, 1954.
- Douglas M. Dunlop. "The Khazars." The Dark Ages: Jews in Christian Europe, 711-1096. 1966.
- Peter B. Golden. Khazar Studies: An Historio-Philological Inquiry into the Origins of the Khazars. Budapest: Akadémiai Kiadó, 1980.
- Peter B. Golden. "Khazar Turkic Ghulâms in Caliphal Service" (Journal Article in Journal Asiatique, 2004.)
- Peter B. Golden. "Khazar Turkic Ghulâms in Caliphal Service: Onomastic Notes" (Journal Article in Archivum Eurasiae Medii Aevi, 1993.)
- Peter B. Golden. "Khazars" (Book Chapter in Turkish-Jewish Encounters: Studies on Turkish-Jewish Relations through the Ages, 2001.)
- Norman Golb and Omeljan Pritsak, Khazarian Hebrew Documents of the Tenth Century. Ithaca: Cornell University Press, 1982.
- Thomas S. Noonan. "Khazaria as an Intermediary between Islam and Eastern Europe in the Second Half of the Ninth Century: The Numismatic Perspective." Archivum Eurasiae Medii Aevi 5 (1985): 179-204.
- Thomas S. Noonan. "Byzantium and the Khazars: a special relationship?" Byzantine Diplomacy: Papers from the Twenty-fourth Spring Symposium of Byzantine Studies, Cambridge, March 1990, ed. Jonathan Shepard and Simon Franklin, pp. 109–132. Aldershot, England: Variorium, 1992.
- Omeljan Pritsak. "The Khazar Kingdom's Conversion to Judaism." (Journal Article in Harvard Ukrainian Studies, 1978)
- Omeljan Pritsak. "The Pre-Ashkenazic Jews of Eastern Europe in Relation to the Khazars, the Rus', and the Lithuanians". Ukrainian-Jewish Relations in Historical Perspective, ed. Howard Aster and Peter J. Potichnyj. Edmonton, Alberta: Canadian Institute of Ukrainian Studies Press, 1990. p. 7.
