= Pax Britannica =

Period of relative world peace under British hegemony

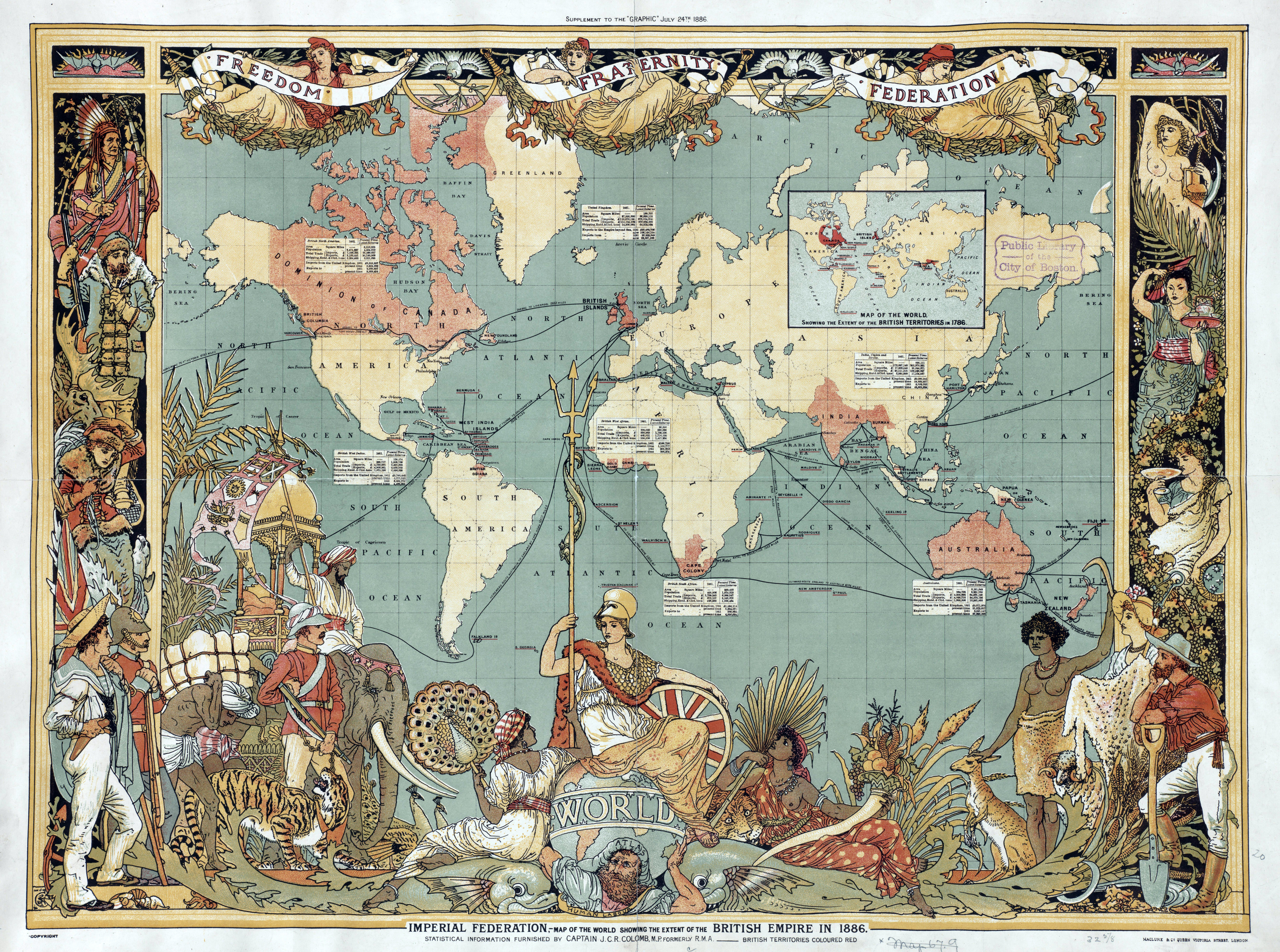
An elaborate map of the British Empire in 1886, marked in red, the traditional colour for imperial British dominions on maps

Pax Britannica (Latin for 'British Peace', modelled after Pax Romana) refers to the relative peace between the great powers in the time period roughly bounded by the Napoleonic Wars and the First World War. During this time the British Empire became the world hegemon, developed an additional informal empire, and adopted the role of a "global policeman".

Between 1815 and 1914, a period sometimes referred to as Britain's "imperial century", around 26,000,000 square kilometres (10,000,000 sq mi) of territory and roughly 400 million people were added to the British Empire. Victory over Napoleonic France left the United Kingdom of Great Britain and Ireland without any serious international rival, other than perhaps the Russian Empire in Central Asia during the Great Game. When Russia attempted to expand its influence in the Balkans, the British and the Second French Empire defeated it in the Crimean War (1853–1856), thereby protecting the weak and declining Ottoman Empire.

The Royal Navy controlled most of the key maritime trade routes and enjoyed unchallenged maritime power. Alongside the formal control exerted over its own colonies, Britain's dominant position in world trade meant that it effectively controlled access to many regions in Asia, South America, Oceania, and Africa. British merchants, shippers, and bankers had such an overwhelming advantage over those of other empires that, in addition to its colonies, Britain developed an informal empire.

== History ==
After losing the Thirteen Colonies, a significant part of British America, in the American Revolution, Britain turned towards Asia, the Pacific and later Africa with subsequent exploration leading to the rise of the "Second British Empire" (1783–1815). The Industrial Revolution began in Great Britain in the late 18th century and new ideas emerged about free markets, such as Adam Smith's The Wealth of Nations (1776). Free trade became a central principle that Britain practised by the 1840s. It played a key role in Britain's economic growth and financial dominance.

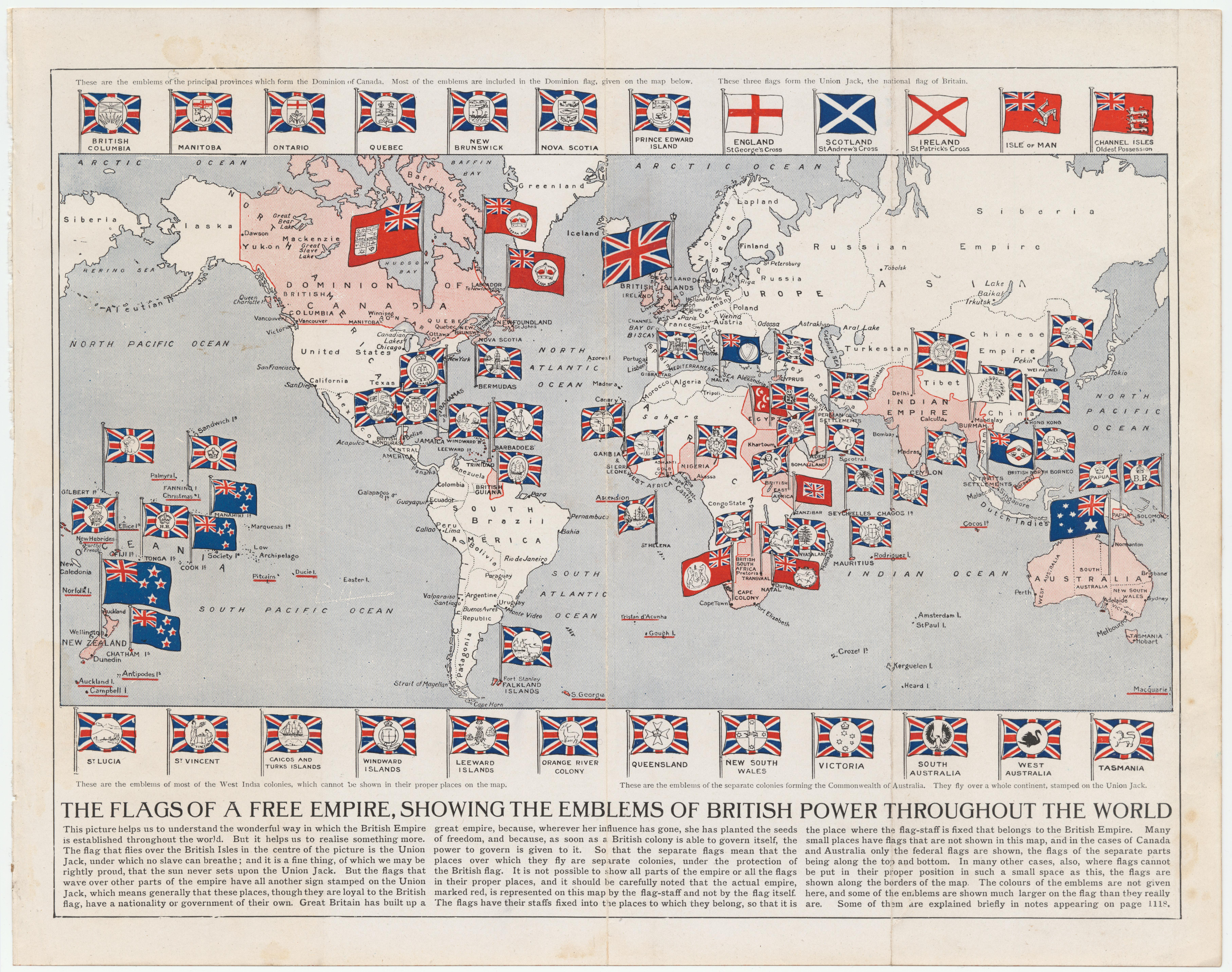
A map of the British Empire in 1910

From the end of the Napoleonic Wars in 1815 until the First World War in 1914, Britain was the global hegemon. Imposition of a "British Peace" on key maritime trade routes began in 1815 with the annexation of British Ceylon (now Sri Lanka). Under the British Residency of the Persian Gulf, local Arab rulers agreed to a number of treaties that formalised Britain's protection of the region. Britain imposed an anti-piracy treaty, known as the General Maritime Treaty of 1820, on all Arab rulers in the region. By signing the Perpetual Maritime Truce of 1853, Arab rulers gave up their right to wage war at sea in return for British protection against external threats. The global superiority of British military and commerce was aided by a divided and relatively weak continental Europe, and the presence of the Royal Navy on all of the world's oceans and seas. Even outside its formal empire, Britain controlled trade with many countries such as China, Siam, and Argentina. Following the Congress of Vienna, the British Empire's economic strength continued to develop through naval dominance and diplomatic efforts to maintain a balance of power in continental Europe.

In this era the Royal Navy provided services around the world that benefited other nations, such as suppressing piracy and blocking the slave trade. The Slave Trade Act 1807 had banned the trade across the Empire, after which the Royal Navy established the West Africa Squadron and the government negotiated international treaties under which they could enforce the ban. Sea power, however, did not project on land. Land wars fought between the major powers include the Crimean War, the Franco-Austrian War, the Austro-Prussian War and the Franco-Prussian War, as well as numerous conflicts between lesser powers. The Royal Navy prosecuted the First Opium War (1839–1842) and Second Opium War (1856–1860) against Qing-dynasty China. The Royal Navy was superior to any other two navies in the world, combined. Between 1815 and the passage of the German naval laws of 1890 and 1898, only France was a potential naval threat. Apart from the Crimean War, it did not engage in any major warfare from 1815 to 1914.

The most decisive event emerged from the Anglo-Egyptian War, which resulted in the British occupation of Egypt for seven decades, even though the Ottoman Empire retained nominal ownership until 1914. The historian A. J. P. Taylor says that this "was a great event; indeed, the only real event in international relations between the Battle of Sedan and the defeat of Russia in the Russo-Japanese war". Taylor emphasises the long-term impact:

The British occupation of Egypt altered the balance of power. It not only gave the British security for their route to India; it made them masters of the Eastern Mediterranean and the Middle East; it made it unnecessary for them to stand in the front line against Russia at the Straits....And thus prepared the way for the Franco-Russian Alliance ten years later. Britain traded goods and capital extensively with countries around the world, adopting a free trade policy after 1840. The growth of British imperial strength was further underpinned by the steamship and the telegraph, new technologies invented in the second half of the 19th century, allowing it to control and defend the empire. By 1902, the British Empire was linked together by a network of telegraph cables, the so-called All Red Line.

The Pax Britannica was weakened by the breakdown of the continental order which had been established by the Congress of Vienna. Relations between the great powers of Europe were strained to a breaking point by issues such as the decline of the Ottoman Empire, which led to the Crimean War, and later the emergence of new nation states in the form of the Kingdom of Italy and, after the Franco-Prussian War, the German Empire. Both of these wars involved Europe's largest states and armies. The industrialisation of Germany, the Empire of Japan, and the United States contributed to the relative decline of British industrial supremacy in the late 19th century.

The start of the First World War in 1914 marked the end of the Pax Britannica. However, the British Empire remained the largest colonial empire until the start of decolonisation after the Second World War ended in 1945, and Britain remained one of the leading powers until the Suez Crisis in 1956, during which British and French troops were forced to withdraw from Egypt under pressure from the United States and (to a lesser extent) the Soviet Union.

== See also ==
- Anglosphere
- Anglo-Saxonism — English racial supremacy myth
- Historiography of the British Empire
- Imperial Federation
- List of wars involving the United Kingdom § United Kingdom of Great Britain and Ireland (1801–1922)
- Pax Americana
- Pax Sovietica
- Pax Sinica
- Pax Romana
- Pax Francica
- Pax Hispanica
- Pax Mongolica
- Political history of the world
