= Pax Sinica =

Periods of regional peace maintained by Chinese hegemony

Pax Sinica (Latin for "Chinese peace"; traditional Chinese: 中華治世; simplified Chinese: 中华治世; pinyin: Zhōnghuá Zhìshì) is a historiographical term referring to historical periods during which the prominence and regional hegemony of China in the Far East provided peace and stability in East Asia, Northeast Asia, Southeast Asia, and Central Asia. A study on the Sinocentric international order reveals that the multiple periods of Pax Sinica, when taken together, amounted to a total length of approximately two thousand years.

The first Pax Sinica of the Eastern world emerged during the rule of the Han dynasty, coinciding with the Pax Romana of the Western world led by the Roman Empire. It stimulated long-distance travel and trade in Eurasian history, as noted by the establishment of the Silk Road and attempted diplomatic contacts between the two empires. Both the first Pax Sinica and the Pax Romana eroded at circa AD 200, with Han Empire weakened by the political infightings, peasant revolts (such as the Yellow Turban Rebellion) and conflicts among warlords (which led to the bloody Three Kingdoms period), and the Roman Empire disintegrating due to Crisis of the Third Century, barbarian invasions (and the subsequent Migration Period) and later the East-West split follow the death of Theodosius I.

Later periods of Pax Sinica include the Tang dynasty, whose influence extended far into Inner Asia, and the Yuan dynasty, a Mongol-ruled empire that formed part of the broader Pax Mongolica. The early modern Ming dynasty managed a wide network of tributary states and displayed its commercial reach through a series of treasure voyages. The Ming dynasty also frequently intervened abroad to defend the sinocentric tributary system, such as in Vietnam or Korea.

== Periods of historical Pax Sinica ==
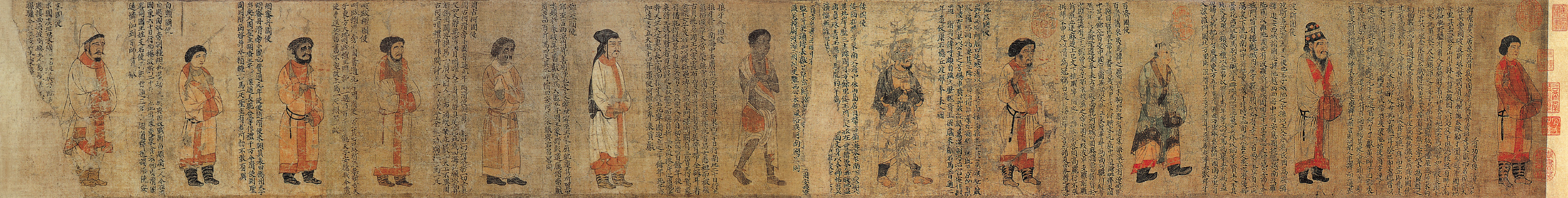
The Portraits of Periodical Offering of Liang. A 6th-century painting in National Museum of China depicting tributary envoys from right to left: Uar (Hephthalites); Persia; Baekje (Korea); Qiuci; Wo (Japan); Langkasuka (in present-day Malaysia); Dengzhi (鄧至) (Qiang) Ngawa; Zhouguke (周古柯), Hebatan (呵跋檀), Humidan (胡密丹), Baiti (白題, similar to the Hephthalite people), who dwell close to Hephthalite; Mo (Qiemo).

=== Han dynasty ===
The first period of Pax Sinica came into being during the Han dynasty of China. Domestically, the power of the emperor was consolidated following the devastation of the feudal system. The Rule of Wen and Jing (文景之治) , the Rule of Zhao and Xuan (昭宣之治) and the Rule of Ming and Zhang (明章之治) were periods of societal stability and economic prosperity. Externally, the Han dynasty neutralized the threat posed by the nomadic Xiongnu following a series of wars. The boundaries of China were extended into what is modern-day western Xinjiang, South Korea (near modern Seoul), and Vietnam (around modern Huế). The Silk Road emerged as a major route that connected the East and the West after the Han diplomat Zhang Qian established contact with the numerous Central Asian tribes and states, thus facilitating commerce and cultural exchanges.

The Pax Sinica established by the Han dynasty is often compared to the Pax Romana of the Roman Empire. The Pax Sinica of the Han dynasty ended following decades of internal turmoil that later led to the downfall of the Han dynasty and a period of fragmentation in Chinese history.

=== Tang dynasty ===
The Tang dynasty was one of the golden ages in Chinese history and presided over another period of Pax Sinica. The Tang capital, Chang'an, was a major economic and cultural hub, and was the world's largest urban settlement at the time. The Silk Road facilitated economic and cultural exchanges between China and the outside world, with Persians and Sogdians among those who benefited the most from such exchanges with China. In the north, the First Turkic Khaganate was defeated and annexed; in the west, the Tang dynasty extended its control as far as modern-day Afghanistan and the Aral Sea; in the east, Tang control reached Sakhalin. During its peak, the Tang dynasty maintained hegemony over 72 tributary states. During this period, Chinese culture was revitalized and became more diverse and cosmopolitan. The amount of interaction between China and Japan increased; Chinese influence on Japanese culture and politics became more prominent since the Tang dynasty.

=== Yuan dynasty ===
The Yuan dynasty was an imperial dynasty of China ruled by ethnic Mongols under Kublai Khan and was the main successor to the Mongol Empire. While the Yuan dynasty is often considered a legitimate Chinese dynasty that bore the Mandate of Heaven, historians usually classify this period under the Pax Mongolica as the Yuan dynasty was quite short-lived and overthrown by Zhu Yuanzhang's northern campaigns.

=== Ming dynasty ===
The Ming dynasty of China presided over another period of Pax Sinica. This period saw the formal institutionalization of the Chinese tributary system, illustrating the great political power of China at the time. The seven maritime expeditions led by Zheng He projected the imperial power of the Ming dynasty across Southeast Asia, South Asia, the Middle East, and East Africa. During this period, China also exerted a great amount of influence on the culture and politics of Korea.

=== Qing dynasty ===
The Qing dynasty of China heralded another period of Pax Sinica. At its peak, it ruled over the fourth largest empire territorially, constituting 9.87 per cent of the world's total land area. The High Qing era was a period of sustained population growth, economic prosperity and territorial expansion. The multicultural and multiethnic nature of the Qing dynasty was fundamental to the subsequent formation of the modern nationalist concept of Zhonghua minzu. As the rulers of the Qing dynasty were ethnic Manchu, this period of peace is also sometimes known as "Pax Manjurica".

=== Analogy to Modern China ===
The People's Republic of China, in the immediate aftermath of the reform and opening up of Deng Xiaoping, adopted a semi-free-market economy, and since then, has been a prominent and preeminent power when it comes to the manufacturing of cheaply made goods, with manufacturing making up 36.5% of China's total economy. This industrial growth, along with other economic and geopolitical factors, has contributed to China's rise as a significant global power. Some scholars have referred to this period of increasing Chinese influence as a new Pax Sinica, while noting that the international landscape has also seen shifts in the relative influence of other major powers, particularly the global hegemonic order of the United States, this phenomenon is referred to as the American decline.

== See also ==
- List of periods of regional peace
  - Pax Romana; Sino-Roman relations; Comparative studies of the Roman and Han empires
  - Pax Kushana & Pax Gupta
  - Pax Mongolica
  - Pax Ottomana
  - Pax Britannica
  - Pax Americana
- Golden ages of China; Chinese Empire; Celestial Empire; Sinocentrism; East Asian cultural sphere
- Chinese culture; Civilization state
- Tianxia Datong ("Great Unity All Under Heaven"); Heaven worship / Mandate of Heaven
  - Son of Heaven & Khan of Heaven
- Silk Road; Tributary system of China
- Chinese Century; Peaceful rise of China; Chinese Dream; Great changes unseen in a century
- China and the United Nations; Military operations other than war (China); Chinese foreign aid; Belt and Road Initiative & Maritime Silk Road
- Constitution of China
  - Five Principles of Peaceful Coexistence
  - Community of Common Destiny
