= Pax Kushana =

Historiographical term

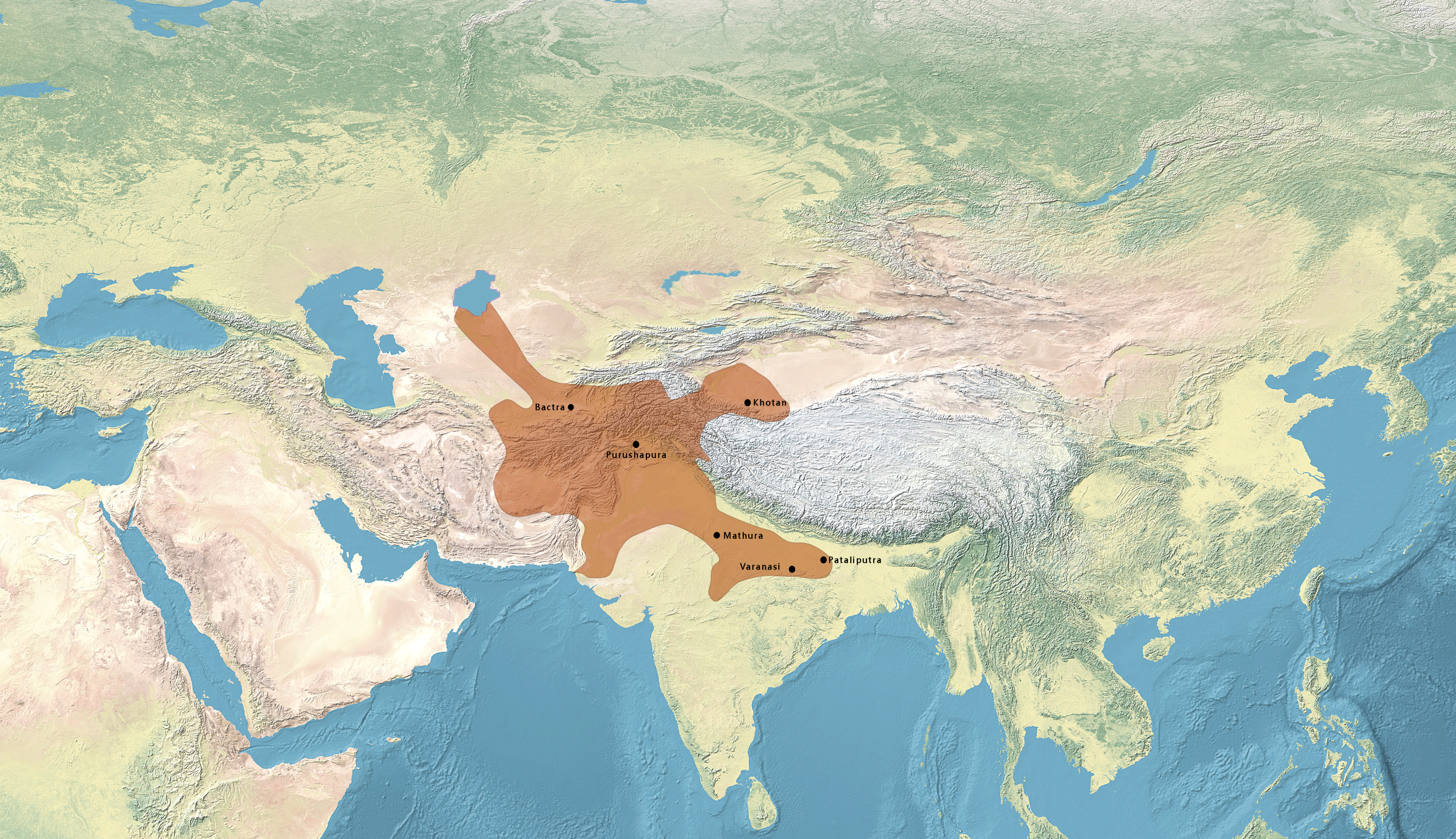
The Kushan Empire and contemporary polities in continental Asia circa 100 AD. The empire was a meeting point between East and West Asia.

Pax Kushana or Pax Kushanica (Latin for "Kushan Peace", modelled after Pax Romana) is a historiographical term sometimes used to describe the social and economic peace in the regions under the Kushan Empire between 2nd and 4th centuries AD, notably in the Indo-Gangetic Plain, Gandhara and parts of Central Asia.

== Background ==
This period was characterized by a high level of urbanization in the Indus Valley and Bactria, greater trade connections between the Indian subcontinent and Central Asia, and expansion of the arable land in the empire. It also oversaw the flourishing of Gandharan Buddhism and transmission of Buddhism through the Silk Road to China.

The Kushan Empire was located on the meeting points of the Sasanian and Parthian empires, Han China, and the various Indian kingdoms to the east. French historian Alain Daniélou states "For a time, the Kushana Empire was the centerpoint of the major civilizations". The peace and prosperity brought by the Kushan Empire resulted in new styles of art and coinage, and strengthened the Indo-Roman trade links.

== See also ==
- Pax Gupta, a period of relative peace in the succeeding Gupta Empire
