= Military operations other than war (China) =

Non-combat military missions conducted by the Chinese armed forces

Chinese military operations other than war (MOOTW; Chinese: 非战争军事行动; pinyin: Fēi zhànzhēng jūnshì xíngdòng) refers to the range of non-combat missions conducted by the People's Liberation Army (PLA) and associated Chinese military forces. These encompass deterring war, resolving conflict, promoting peace, providing humanitarian assistance, and supporting civil authorities in response to domestic crises.

China's 2008 Defense White Paper formally elevated MOOTW as a core function of the PLA alongside traditional warfighting, a development codified in subsequent defense policy documents.

== Specialized forces ==
The PLA has established dedicated force structures for MOOTW contingencies. Current doctrine anticipates five specialized functional groups:

1. Flood and disaster relief forces
2. Post-earthquake emergency rescue forces
3. Emergency rescue forces for nuclear, chemical, and biological disasters
4. Emergency relief forces for transportation infrastructure
5. International peacekeeping forces

The PLA and People's Armed Police (PAP) are routinely deployed in response to major domestic natural disasters. Notable operations include:

- 2008 Sichuan earthquake: Over 100,000 PLA and PAP troops were mobilised in what became the largest domestic military disaster-relief operation in PRC history.
- 2010 Yushu earthquake: Military forces conducted search, rescue, and reconstruction operations in difficult high-altitude terrain in Qinghai.
- Annual flood-relief operations: Specialised forces are deployed each year along major river systems, including the Yangtze and Yellow rivers.

== United Nations peacekeeping ==
China has participated in United Nations peacekeeping operations since 1990, when it first sent military observers to the United Nations Truce Supervision Organization (UNTSO) in the Middle East. It has since deployed forces to more than a dozen UN missions and has committed upwards of 3,000 personnel to active peacekeeping operations at a time, making it the largest contributor among the five permanent members of the UN Security Council.

China has been one of the largest troop contributors to the United Nations Mission in South Sudan (UNMISS) since the mission's establishment in 2011. Chinese contingents have included infantry battalions, engineering units, and medical teams.

On 10 July 2016, during intense fighting between government and opposition forces in Juba, two Chinese peacekeepers were killed and five others wounded when their armoured personnel carrier came under fire near the UNMISS base at UN House. It was among the deadliest incidents involving Chinese peacekeepers in the mission's history and prompted the UN to deploy an additional regional protection force to Juba.

China has contributed engineering and medical units to the United Nations Interim Force in Lebanon (UNIFIL) since 2006, following the 2006 Lebanon War. Personnel have assisted with demining, infrastructure reconstruction, and medical care for local communities.

Following France's Operation Serval, China deployed forces to the United Nations Multidimensional Integrated Stabilization Mission in Mali (MINUSMA) from 2013. Contributions included security, engineering, and medical capabilities operating in a high-threat environment.

== Counter-piracy operations ==
Beginning in December 2008, China deployed People's Liberation Army Navy task forces to the Gulf of Aden and waters off Somalia in response to a surge in Somali piracy. The deployment marked the first time the PLA Navy had operated in foreign waters for a combat-related mission since the 15th century. Successive naval task forces have continued rotational deployments, escorting hundreds of merchant vessels and deterring attacks.

== See also ==
- Pax Sinica
