= Comparative studies of the Roman and Han empires =

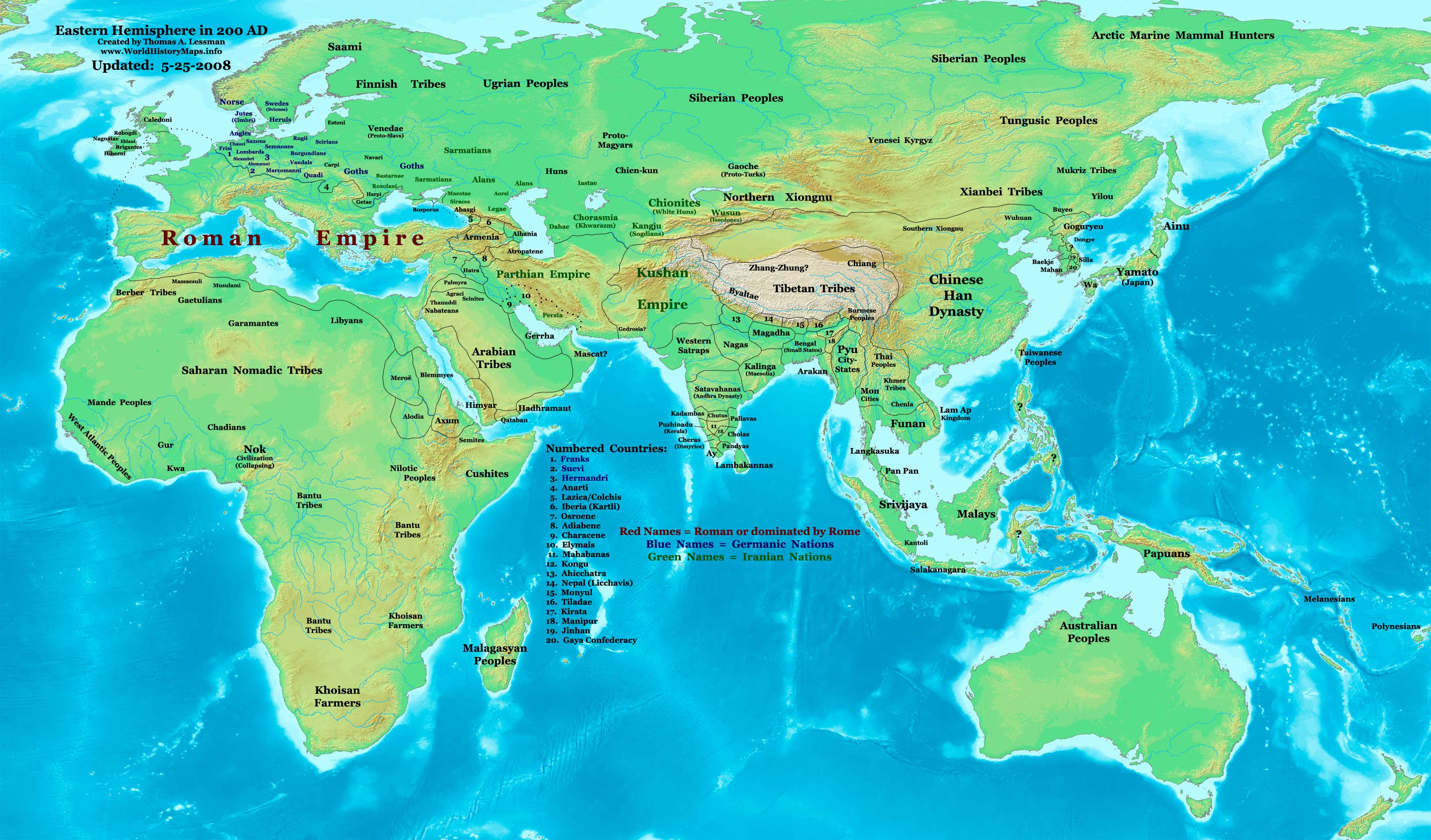
Political map of the Eastern Hemisphere in AD 200

Historians have engaged in historical comparative research involving the roughly contemporaneous Roman Empire and the Han dynasty of early imperial China. At their peaks, both states controlled up to a half of the world population and produced political and cultural legacies that endure to the modern era; comparative studies largely focus on their similar universal scale at their pinnacles and on synchronism in their rise and decline.

The vast majority of studies focus on one or the other but the comparison of the two has attracted interest in the 21st century. Of all comparative history, the most popular seems to David Engels' research comparing the advent of the Qin and the Han dynasties with the ascension of imperial Rome, though it is probably second to the comparison between Rome and the United States. Studies examine the patterns of ethnicity, identity, the views of foreigners, and geopolitics. Scholars also explore the relevance of ancient structures and characteristics to China's loss of world leadership in what has been called the Early Modern "Great Divergence".

== History ==
Oswald Spengler in his magnum opus The Decline of the West (1922) stressed that the development of China during the Warring States "in innumerable parallels" corresponds to the contemporary Mediterranean world (301-50 BC), with the Chinese wars in 368-320 BC corresponding in political outcome to the Second Punic War. He regarded Qin as the "Roman" state of China because Qin similarly founded a universal empire in its world. The First Emperor of the unified China, Hwang-ti assumed the title "Shi," literally the equivalent to "Augustus." He began to build the Chinese Limes, the Great Wall. Both fortifications protected against the barbarian.

The historian Frederick John Teggart in 1939 published Rome and China: A Study of Correlations in Historical Events, covering the period of the Han dynasty. Teggart criticized the dominant narrative form of history aiming mainly to emphasize the greatness of one's own nation. His purpose of the Correlations was scientific understanding of affairs of nations and generalization of causes and effects. History must inquire "not only into what has happened, but into the way things actually work in the affairs of men." Besides the scientific comparative approach, his Correlations with China was revolutionary also in breaking the bond of Eurocentrism: "The study of the past can become effective only when it is fully realized that all peoples have histories, that their history run concurrently and in the same world, and that the act of comparing is the beginning of all knowledge." The comparison, Teggart argued, revealed a correspondence in barbarian invasions throughout the continent of Eurasia, "and thus brought to light relations in the histories of widely separated areas which had not previously been suspected."

Walter Scheidel reviewed the previous scholarship when he explained the purpose of Stanford University's ancient Chinese and Mediterranean Empires Comparative History Project and the framework of its study in the early 21st century. Max Weber and Karl August Wittfogel both wrote works comparing ancient Mediterranean civilization and China; however, their studies have had little influence on later historians of the ancient world. Scheidel gives this as a contributing cause to the relative paucity of comparative studies between the two, though several scholars have made such studies. In the 1970s, principles of sociological examination have been identified that can be applied to the study of Han China and Rome. They draw on analytical and illustrative comparisons.

The majority of the research in the subject area has concentrated on looking at the intellectual and philosophical history of each society. Scheidel also noted a change in the direction of research in the 2000s, with a refocusing on the "nature of moral, historical, and scientific thought" in Greece and China. These researches have tended to focus on the philosophical and intellectual histories of China and the Greco-Roman world, and despite modern interest, gaps remain in the scholarship comparing Rome and the Han Empires. Scheidel notes that there are no comparative studies of high culture; there is also a virtual absence of work on "political, social, economic or legal history" of the Greco-Roman world and ancient China, though historian Samuel Adshead addressed the issue.

In 1961, Adshead published an article comparing Rome and China. While outlining several parallels, especially the synchronism of their political patterns, he emphasized that contrasts overshadowed similarities and the two should not even be called by one word ("empire"). In his China in World History, Adshead compared the Han China and the Roman Empire before Constantine. He repeated that their "differences outweighed the similarities". However, his comparisons have received negative response from experts on Chinese history who cite his lack of use of Chinese sources, poor support of his arguments and eagerness to take poorly supported points as facts. More recently, sinologists have been engaging in comparative work on political institutions between China and Rome and between China and early modern Europe.

For their volume on the birth of the Chinese Empire, a team of Sinologists recruited a Roman Historian, Alexander Yakobson, to compare the First Emperors in the Roman and Chinese world. The choice, they explained, is not casual. "Few figures in world history can be compared to the [Chinese] First Emperor as meaningfully as can Augustus." Both founded long lasting Empires. In his chapter, Yakobson outlines the parallels between the First Emperors of Rome and China. Both were legitimized as pacifiers of their worlds, Augustus ending civil wars and Qin Shi Huang inter-state wars. Their peace monuments, Ara Pacis Augustae and Twelve Metal Colossi, symbolized Pax Romana and Pax Sinica respectively. Res Gestae of Augustus parallels the imperial steles of Qin Shi Huang in the content of the message. Both glorify themselves as superhumans who have completed achievements of superhuman magnitude. Yakobson supposes that the existence of such parallels might point to certain fundamental patterns of empire that transcend the divide between civilizations.

In 2021, Jakobson contributed to another volume devoted to the comparison of Greece, Rome and China. This article focuses more on differences between the First Emperors. Coming from the monarchic background, Qin Shi Huangdi had a simpler life than Augustus who had to fake an elaborate republican façade to cover his monarchy. Contributing to the same volume, David Engels suggested that a comparison between the rise of the Roman and the Chinese emperors should not be confined to parallels between Augustus and Qin Shi Huangdi alone, but has to include Caesar and the advent of the Han dynasty. The abrupt rules of Julius Caesar and the Qin Dynasty were followed in both cases by civil wars and then stable universal monarchy. This approach allows us to see two "closely mirroring" political evolutions and hence supposes structural dynamics.

A comparative monograph from the official Chinese perspective was published by expert on ethnicity Pan Yue.

== Political pattern ==
One of the most appealing reasons for historians to begin comparing Han China and Roman Empire, is their synchronous ascent to political hegemony over the Mediterranean and East Asia respectively. The two exhibit an "extraordinary" synchronism:

- Both systems existed as warring states during the Axial Age;
- Qin conquered its world in 221 BC, while Rome established its hegemony over the Mediterranean in 189 BC;
- both empires endured for centuries until the Han Empire dissolved in 220 AD and the Western Roman Empire followed suit in 476;
- both began reconquests in the sixth century but at this point proceeded in opposite directions—China under the Sui dynasty completed its reunification while Justinian's failed.

The Sui-Justinian era marks the divergence when the two civilizations proceeded in reverse directions—China remained unified while the Mediterranean never repeated its ancient unity. Adshead called this a "major watershed" to "expansion in modern Europe" and to "implosion in pre-modern China." In 2009, Scheidel coined the term "divergence" and the phrase "the first great divergence" to distinguish from the title of Kenneth Pomeranz’s The Great Divergence. "Divergence" became the accepted term.

Dominic Lieven devoted a chapter to the comparison between Rome and China where he supposed that the comparative analysis of this divergence might reveal much about the sources of imperial power and the factors that contribute to the rise, fall and longevity of empire. For Scheidel, "the most striking divergence concerns their afterlife: the effective absence of universal empire from the post-Roman Europe and its serial reconstitution in East Asia." He regretted that the causes for this divergence remain neglected in the research.

Scheidel and his colleagues Max Ostrovsky, Randolph B. Ford and Pan Yue partly filled this gap in the research. Ford emphasized ethnic patterns. Sinification was both cultural and ethnic. The rule of foreign peoples over China never became legitimate. They had to assimilate into the Han Chinese and look for an ethno-genealogical connection to Chinese mythical or historical ancestors. By contrast, Romanization and Christianization did not involve ethnic assimilation. Foreign ethnic origins of the post-Roman rulers were regarded as legitimate in both the former Western Empire and Byzantium. Along similar lines argues Pan Yue. Both scholars ignore that the invaders of the Western Roman Empire equally fast assimilated within local populations thus leaving their readers puzzled how this made the difference.

Ostrovsky focused on geopolitical conditions in his comparative analysis of the divergence: China never expanded beyond the Great Wall, Tibet, or overseas. By contrast, the Mediterranean civilization was ever-expanding beyond the Roman limes, northward and eastward during the Middle Ages, and overseas afterwards. European kingdoms turned their exceeding energies outward and internal European power was balanced.

Adshead similarly supposed that due to "isolation of China behind desert, mountains and jungles … and with its back to a dead ocean," the Chinese elites strove to unity more than the European. Scheidel stressed that the isolated China lacked state-level competitors of the caliber of the Sasanian Empire and Caliphate. Sinologist Victoria Tin-bor Hui drew a geopolitical explanation too. The ancient Chinese system, she wrote, was relatively enclosed, whereas the European system began to expand its reach to the rest of the world from the onset of system formation. In addition, overseas provided outlet for territorial competition, thereby allowing international competition on the European continent to trump the ongoing pressure toward convergence.

In the field of comparative studies between empires, not just Rome and Han, Shmuel Eisenstadt's The Political System of Empires (1963) has been described as influential as it pioneered the comparative approach. In modern studies of imperialism, however, ancient China has generally been overlooked. In Scheidel's words, "[compared to the study of Europe and China in the early modern period] the comparative history of the largest agrarian empires of antiquity has attracted no attention at all. This deficit is only explicable with reference to academic specialization and language barriers".

Scheidel omitted two notable studies, The Decline of the West by Spengler and Civilization on Trial by Arnold J. Toynbee. Spengler outlined three parallel phases which began in China c. 600 BC, the Mediterranean c. 450 BC and the modern world c. 1700. In all three cases, the size of armies and the scale of warfare increase. In the modern case the trend is demonstrated by Napoleonic Wars, the American Civil War, and the World War (the book was published before the Second World War) and is accelerated by modern military technology. Having correlated the Chinese wars of 368-320 BC with the Second Punic War, Spengler added that the latter War corresponds to the settlement of the Versailles Treaty in that both avoided the "idea of the wiping out one of the leading great powers of the world" but we are in the same evolutionary chain of the three Punic Wars. The Third ended with Cato's proclamation Carthago delenda est. The thesis had been published a couple of decades before a famous Charter proclaimed a similar fate for Spengler's country. Comparing the three ages, the ancient Chinese, the Roman, and the Modern, Spengler states that "Caesarism" is an inevitable product of such an age and it "suddenly outlines itself on the horizon." In China the culmination occurred with the First Emperor, in the Mediterranean with Sulla and Pompey and in our world is expected in one century [=2022].

Whether influenced by Spengler or not, Toynbee drew a similar pattern for the same three civilizations. Ancient Mediterranean and Chinese worlds passed continual rounds of wars going on to a bitter end at which one surviving great power—Rome and Qin respectively—"knocked out" its last remaining competitor and by conquest imposed the overdue peace on the world, Pax Romana and Pax Sinica. Having projected the unification of the modern world on the cases of Rome and Qin, Toynbee noted that, by contrast, the modern ultimate "blow" would be atomic. But Toynbee remains optimistic: No doubt, the modern world has far greater capacity to reconstruct than the Chinese and the Romans had.

Long time since the works of Spengler and Toynbee the comparative analysis between ancient Rome and China and its implications for the modern world did not receive further development but this changed with the emergence of the United States of America as effectively the only superpower in the world after the fall of the Soviet Union in 1991. The event led to a so-called "imperial turn" in the academic research meaning increased interest in the study of empires, particularly the Roman Empire. During the war on terror, the number of publications related to empire has increased exponentially accompanied by "stormy debates" on empires and Sinologist Yuri Pines coined the term "comparative imperiology." The Roman Empire has been compared to American dominance on the level of a cliché. The United States' hegemony is unprecedented in the modern system and thus the only illuminating cases can be found in pre-modern systems: "One difficulty with analyzing unipolarity is that we have mainly the current case, although examining Roman Europe and Han China could be illuminating."

In order to illuminate, Ostrovsky compared the evolution of the early hegemonies of Rome (189–168 BC) and Qin (364–221 BC). Since the condition of global closure (impossibility to expand) makes our world system more similar to China than Rome, the Chinese political pattern is supposed to be more relevant for us than the Roman. This implies hard anti-hegemonic balancing like against Qin rather than soft balancing like against Rome, total war and sweeping conquest like Qin in 230–221 BC rather than Rome's gradual annexations, and, if civilization survives, a cosmopolitan revolution, like the Han revolution in 202 BC and the Edict of Caracalla in AD 212, which similarly would turn the global American Empire into World State. Since the modern system will remain totally circumscribed until the end of history, this World State is likely to be permanent like the Chinese rather than temporary like the Roman.

== Rationale ==
According to Adshead's book China in World History, comparing Han China and Roman Europe gives context and assists understanding of China's interactions and relations with other civilisations of Antiquity. "Other comparisons could be made ... None, however, offers so close a parallel with Han dynasty as the Roman empire". In the opinion of Scheidel:

Only comparisons with other civilizations make it possible to distinguish common features from culturally specific or unique characteristics and developments, help us identify variables that were critical to particular historical outcomes and allow us to assess the nature of any given ancient state or society within the wider context of premodern world history.

Comparative analysis, Scheidel added elsewhere, generates new causal insights which are impossible for analysis confined to single cases. Large-scale comparisons can "identify broader patterns and underlying causes that might otherwise remain submerged in a morass of historical detail." Regarding why China and Rome, Scheidel explains that these two were among the largest (especially by population) and persistent of pre-modern empires, and in addition expanding and collapsing at roughly the same time. After their collapses, the two became ideal-type counterpoints. Post-Roman Europe became a perennially robust polycentrism and the Chinese imperial unity unusually resilient by world historical standards. The comparison between the two is supposed to identify factors favoring serial imperiogenesis in China and obstructing it in Europe. In the words of Fritz-Heiner Mutschler and Achim Mittag, "Comparing the Roman and Han empires contributes not only to understanding the trajectories along which the two civilizations developed, but also to heightening our awareness of possible analogies between the present and the past, be it with regard to America or China." Recent work by Ronald A. Edwards shows how such comparisons can be helpful in understanding ancient Han Chinese and Roman European political institutions.

For Ostrovsky, the comparative analysis is vital for understanding the fall of Rome and the survival of China. The former case is one of the most extensive historical researches and counts multiple factors all of which can be true. Regarding the question why the fall of Rome was fatal, however, the comparison with the Han China is the key rationale. It outlines the decisive factor (geopolitical circumscription) among multiple secondary. Moreover, he claims, it probably illuminates where we are heading.

At last, comparison between the Roman and Han empires is aided by the rich amount of written evidence from both, as well as other artefactual sources. Already Spengler emphasized the existence of the vast primary sources on the Warring States and stressed that the development corresponds not only to the contemporary Mediterranean world but also to "our own present time."

== See also ==
- Sino-Roman relations
- Translation of Han dynasty titles
