= Damudarpur =

- Village
- Location in Punjab, India Damudarpur (India)
- Coordinates: 31.301343°N 75.6677102°E
- Country: India
- State: Punjab
- District: Jalandhar

Government
  - Type: Panchayat raj
  - Body: Gram panchayat
- Elevation: 240 m (790 ft)

Languages
  - Official: Punjabi
- Time zone: UTC+5:30 (IST)
- ISO 3166 code: IN-PB
- Website: jalandhar.nic.in

Damudarpur is a village in Jalandhar district of Punjab State, India. It is located 12 kilometres (7.5 mi) from the district's headquarters, Jalandhar, and 142 kilometres (88 mi) from the state capital, Chandigarh. The village is administrated by a sarpanch who is an elected representative of village as per Panchayati raj (India).

== See also ==
- List of villages in India
