= Ming campaigns against the Mongols =

Ming campaigns against the Mongols refer to a series of battles and other military efforts conducted by the Ming dynasty against the Mongols.

These include:

- Ming conquest of Yunnan, the final phase in the Ming dynasty expulsion of Yuan dynasty from China proper in the 1380s.
- Ming campaign against the Uriankhai, an offensive military expedition campaign in 1387 of Ming dynasty's army led by Feng Sheng against the Uriankhai horde of the Mongol chieftain Naghachu in Manchuria, concluding with the surrender of the Uriankhai.
- Battle of Buir Lake, fought between the Ming dynasty's army led by Lan Yu and Northern Yuan forces under Toghus Temur at Buir Lake in 1388, concluding with the defeat of the Northern Yuan horde and the capture of many of their people.
- Yongle Emperor's campaigns against the Mongols, a series of aggressive military campaigns under the Yongle Emperor, from 1410 to 1424, against the Eastern Mongols, Oirat Mongols, and various other Mongol tribes.
