= Parasika kingdom =

Parasika (Sanskrit: पारसिक) was an ancient Yavana kingdom inhabited by the Parasikas tribe and mentioned in the Indian epic the Mahabharata.

A king named Parasarya is mentioned at two locations in Mahabharata, at 2:4 and at 2:7. It is not clear if he belonged to the Parasikas.

== See also ==
- Kingdoms of ancient India
- Hyoscyamus niger, known in Sanskrit as Parasika Yavani
