= List of places named after peace =

The following is a list of geographic names denoting the concept of peace, in their respective language.

== Languages in this list ==
- vrede - Afrikaans and Dutch
- makmur – Arabic (’tranquility’)
- salaam – Arabic
- 安平 – Chinese, Mandarin (an’ping) or 平安 (ping’an) or simply 安 (an)
- 长安 – Chinese, Mandarin (chang’an, eternal peace)
- 和平 – Chinese, Mandarin (he’ping) or 平和 (ping’he)
- 安 – Chinese, Teochew & Cantonese (on)
- fred – Danish and Swedish
- peace – English
- kapayapaan — Filipino
- paix – French
- Frieden – German
- shalom – Hebrew
- shaanti — Hindi
- béke – Hungarian (cf. békés ’peaceful’)
- 平安 – Japanese (hei’an)
- 平和 – Japanese (heiwa)
- sentosa – Malay
- aman - Malay
- paz - Portuguese and Spanish
- Shanti, shanthi, santi from Sanskrit
- mir, myr – Russian, Ukrainian
- สันติภาพ, สันติ (santiphap, santi) – Thai and Lao
- an bình – Vietnamese equivalent of Chinese an’ping
- hòa bình – Vietnamese equivalent of Chinese he’ping

== List ==
=== Argentina ===
- La Paz, Córdoba
- La Paz, Entre Ríos
- La Paz, Mendoza
- La Paz Department, Catamarca
- La Paz Department, Mendoza

=== Bangladesh ===
- Salamabad Union

=== Bolivia ===
- La Paz, administrative capital of Bolivia
- La Paz Department (Bolivia)
- La Paz Municipality, Bolivia
- La Paz River

=== Brunei ===
- Brunei Darussalam - 'Abode of Peace', long name of country

=== Canada ===
- Friedensruh, province of Manitoba
- International Peace Garden, province of Manitoba
- Municipal District of Peace No. 135, province of Alberta
- Myrnam, province of Alberta (the name means 'peace to us' in Ukrainian)
- Notre-Dame-de-la-Paix (the name means 'Our-Lady-of-Peace' in French)
- Peace River
- Peace River, province of Alberta
- Peace River Block
- Peace River Country
- Peace River Airport
- Peace River Regional District, province of British Columbia
- Salem, Ontario, province of Ontario
- Waterton-Glacier International Peace Park, province of Alberta
- Wetaskiwin, province of Alberta (the name means 'the hills where peace was made' in Cree)

=== China, PRC ===
- 安海镇 Anhai Town, Quanzhou city
- Anping County, of Hengshui, Hebei
- Anping, Cenxi, in Cenxi City, Guangxi
- Anping, Anping County, in Anping County, Hebei
- Anping, Xianghe County, in Xianghe County, Hebei
- Anping, Zhecheng County, in Zhecheng County, Henan
- Anping, Anren County, in Anren County, Hunan
- Anping, Lianyuan, in Lianyuan City, Hunan
- 安平桥 Anping Bridge, Quanzhou city
- Beijing (formerly Beiping 北平, or 'Northern Peace')
- Chang'an Avenue, a major east-west thoroughfare in Beijing
- Chang'an District, Shijiazhuang, Hebei
- Chang'an District, Xi'an, Shaanxi
- Chang'an Subdistrict, Mudanjiang, in Dong'an District, Mudanjiang, Heilongjiang
- Chang'an Subdistrict, Linxiang, Hunan, in Linxiang City, Hunan
- Chang'an Subdistrict, Wuxi, in Huishan District, Wuxi, Jiangsu
- Chang'an Subdistrict, Jiaohe, in Jiaohe City, Jilin
- Chang'an Subdistrict, Shenyang, in Dadong District, Shenyang, Liaoning
- Chang'an Subdistrict, Xichang, in Xichang City, Sichuan
- Chang'an Township, Gansu, in Ganzhou District, Zhangye
- Chang'an Township, Guizhou, in Huishui County
- Chang'an Township, Hunan, in Hengyang County
- Chang'an Township, Linshui County, in Linshui County, Sichuan
- Chang'an Township, Luzhou, in Longmatan District, Luzhou, Sichuan
- Chang'an, Anhui, in Jixi County
- Chang'an, Dongguan, Guangdong
- Chang'an, Fengkai County, in Fengkai County, Guangdong
- Chang'an, Guangxi, in Rong'an County, Guangxi
- Chang'an, Dandong, in Donggang, Liaoning
- Chang'an, Pingli County, in Pingli County, Shaanxi
- Chang'an, Haining, in Haining City, Zhejiang
- Chang'an, Hangzhou, in Fuyang District, Hangzhou, Zhejiang
- Heping District, Tianjin (和平区)
- Heping District, Shenyang (和平区), Liaoning
- Heping County (和平县), of Heyuan, Guangdong
- Heping Subdistrict (和平街道)
  - Heping Subdistrict, Shaoguan, in Zhenjiang District, Shaoguan, Guangdong
  - Heping Subdistrict, Gaobeidian, Hebei
  - Heping Subdistrict, Handan, in Congtai District, Handan, Hebei
  - Heping Subdistrict, Wuhan, in Hongshan District, Wuhan, Hubei
  - Heping Subdistrict, Baotou, in Donghe District, Baotou, Inner Mongolia
  - Heping Subdistrict, Ulan Hot, Inner Mongolia
  - Heping Subdistrict, Xuzhou, in Quanshan District, Xuzhou, Jiangsu
  - Heping Subdistrict, Meihekou, Jilin
  - Heping Subdistrict, Anshan City, in Tiedong District, Anshan, Liaoning
  - Heping Subdistrict, Fushun, in Wanghua District, Fushun, Liaoning
  - Heping Subdistrict, Fuxin, in Haizhou District, Fuxin, Liaoning
  - Heping Subdistrict, Zibo, in Zhangdian District, Zibo, Shandong
  - Heping Subdistrict, Taiyuan, in Wanbailin District, Taiyuan, Shanxi
  - Heping Subdistrict, Tacheng, Xinjiang
- Towns named (和平镇)
  - Heping, Shaowu, Fujian
  - Heping, Zhangping, Fujian
  - Heping, Wuwei, in Liangzhou District, Wuwei, Gansu
  - Heping, Yuzhong County, Gansu
  - Heping, Shantou, in Chaoyang District, Shantou, Guangdong
  - Heping, Teng County, Guangxi
  - Heping, Huishui County, Guizhou
  - Heping, Yanhe County, in Yanhe Tujia Autonomous County, Guizhou
  - Heping, Qiongzhong County, in Qiongzhong Li and Miao Autonomous County, Hainan
  - Heping, Tailai County, Heilongjiang
  - Heping, Wudalianchi, Heilongjiang
  - Heping, Guiyang County, Hunan
  - Heping, Huai'an, in Qingpu District, Huai'an, Jiangsu
  - Heping, Fenxi County, Shanxi
  - Heping, Changxing County, Zhejiang
- Heping Township (和平乡)
  - Heping Township, Yuexi County, Anhui
  - Heping Township, Longxi County, Gansu
  - Heping Township, Longsheng County, in Longsheng Various Nationalities Autonomous County, Guangxi
  - Heping Township, Sanjiang County, in Sanjiang Dong Autonomous County, Guangxi
  - Heping Township, Tongren City, Guizhou
  - Heping Township, Zhaoyuan County, Heilongjiang
  - Heping Township, Hengyang, in Zhuhui District, Hengyang, Hunan
  - Heping Township, Faku County, Liaoning
  - Heping Township, Huangyuan County, Qinghai
  - Heping Township, Anyue County, Sichuan
  - Heping Township, Nanjiang County, Sichuan
  - Heping Township, Xinlong County, Sichuan
  - Heping Township, Zigong, in Da'an District, Zigong, Sichuan
  - Heping Township, Yunxiao County, Zhejiang
- Ping'an Avenue (平安街), major through route in Beijing, China
- Ping'an County (平安县), in Qinghai Province, China
- Ping'an, Lanzhou, in Honggu District, Lanzhou, Gansu
- Ping'an, Qing'an County, in Heilongjiang
- Ping'an, Baicheng, in Taobei District, Baicheng, Jilin
- Ping'an, Shulan, in Jilin
- Ping'an, Ping'an County, in Qinghai
- Ping'an Township (平安乡), name of several townships in China
  - Ping'an Township, Fengjie County, in Chongqing
  - Ping'an Township, Pengshui County, in Chongqing
  - Ping'an Township, Zhangjiachuan County, in Zhangjiachuan Hui Autonomous County, Tianshui, Gansu
  - Ping'an Township, Gongcheng County, in Guilin
  - Ping'an Township, Jiamusi, in Jiao District, Jiamusi, Heilongjiang
  - Ping'an Township, Hure Banner, in Tongliao, Inner Mongolia
  - Ping'an Township, Dawa County, in Liaoning
  - Ping'an Township, Zhangwu County, in Liaoning
  - Ping'an Township, Yuechi County, in Guang'an, Sichuan
- Pinghe County
- Shanghai Pinghe School
- 西安 Xi'an (literally, western peace; old name 长安 = everlasting peace)

=== Colombia ===
- La Paz, Cesar
- La Paz, Santander

=== Costa Rica ===
- La Paz Waterfall, Costa Rica
- University for Peace, San Jose, CR

=== Cyprus ===
- Bellapais

=== Denmark ===
- Fredensborg
  - Fredensborg Palace
- Fredensdal, a house

=== Egypt ===
- Al Salam Bridge; see Suez Canal Bridge

=== El Salvador ===
- La Paz Department (El Salvador)
- La Paz, La Paz Department

=== France ===
- Place de la Paix, Suresnes

=== Germany ===
- Friedeburg in East Frisia, a city in the Frisian region of Germany
- Friedeburg upon Saale, state of Saxony-Anhalt, Germany
- Friedenau, a locality of the city-state of Berlin, Germany
- Friedensdorf, state of Saxony-Anhalt, Germany
- Salem, Baden-Württemberg
  - Salem Abbey (Reichskloster Salem), a monastery
  - Schule Schloss Salem, Germany (also referred to as Salem College, with a section called Salem International College)
- Salem, Schleswig-Holstein

=== Haiti ===
- Port-de-Paix, Haiti

=== Honduras ===
- La Paz, Honduras
- La Paz Department (Honduras)

=== Hungary ===
- Békés County
  - its seat, Békéscsaba city
  - cities and towns in this county: Békés, Békéssámson, Békésszentandrás
  - geographical names related to this county: Békési-hát, Békési-sík

Note that another county in Hungary (approx. 30 mi northeast of Békés) has a name with a quasi-opposite meaning, Heves, i.e. ’vehement.’

=== India ===
- Shantipur, Nadia District, West Bengal
- Santipur (community development block), Nadia District, West Bengal
- Shantipuri Tanda Range, Uttarakhand
- Shanthipuram a town in Andhra Pradesh - from Shanthi 'peace' in Sanskrit.
- Santhipuram mandal, Chitoor District, Andhra Pradesh

=== Indonesia ===
- Province of Aceh, former full name Nanggroe Aceh Darussalam

=== Iran ===
- Salam, Chaharmahal and Bakhtiari, Iran

=== Israel, Palestine ===
- Jerusalem (Y-R-V = foundation, Sh-L-M = peace), Hebrew
- Kerem Shalom, means vineyard of peace in Hebrew
- Salem, alternate official spelling of Salim, Nablus
- Shaqib al-Salam \ Segev Shalom
- Wahat al-Salam – Neve Shalom, means oasis of peace in Arabic and Hebrew

=== Japan ===
- 平和の森公園 Heiwanomori Park - Peace Forest Park, Tokyo
- 平和島駅 Heiwajima Station (railway), Tokyo
- 広島平和記念公園 Hiroshima Peace Memorial Park, Hiroshima City
- Kyoto City, (known in classical times as 平安京 Heian'kyo = 'Capital of Peace')
- 平和公園 Heiwa Park, Nagasaki Peace Park
- 平和通り Heiwa Dori, 'Peace Avenue', Naha, Okinawa
- 平和台駅, Heiwadai Station (Railway), Tokyo
- Nara City, (known in classical times as 平城京 Heijo'kyo = 'Capital Fortress of Peace')
- 平和の滝 'Peace Fall', Sapporo, Hokkaido
- 平和町 (前橋市), Maebashi, Gunma
- 平和町 (金沢市), Kanazawa, Ishikawa
- 平和町 (稲沢市), Inazawa, Aichi

=== Malaysia ===
- Aman Jaya, Sungai Petani, Kedah Malaysia 'Victory of Peace' in Malay
- Bukit Aman, 'Peace Hill', Malaysian Police headquarters district in Kuala Lumpur
- Pahang state, Darul Makmur 'Abode of Tranquility' in Arabic
- Taiping, Perak, Malaysia renamed from Larut to Taiping ("太平" in Chinese, meaning "everlasting peace") after the Larut Wars

=== Mali ===
- Salam, Mali

=== Mexico ===
- La Paz, Baja California Sur
  - La Paz Municipality, Baja California Sur
- La Paz, State of Mexico, a large suburb of Mexico City

=== Netherlands ===
- Vredepeel

=== North Korea ===
- Hwapyong County, cognate of Chinese He’ping
- Pyongan Province, North Korea (평안 = 平安 meaning peace)
- Pyongyang, 평양 derived from 平壤, Peaceful Land (once formerly Chang’an; or 'eternal peace')

=== Philippines ===
- Kapayapaan Village, Canlubang, in Calamba, Laguna
- La Paz, Abra
- La Paz, Agusan del Sur
- La Paz, Iloilo City, a district of Iloilo City
- La Paz, Leyte
- La Paz, Tarlac

=== Portugal ===
- Beja, Portugal (from Latin Pax Julia via Arabic Baja)

=== Singapore ===
- Sentosa island, from Malay 'peace'

=== South Africa ===
- Ekurhuleni (also known as the East Rand) – from Tsonga "place of peace".
- Liefde en Vrede, suburb of Johannesburg, Gauteng – from Afrikaans "vrede"
- Peace Haven, suburb of Randfontein, Gauteng
- Peace Heights, suburb of Sebokeng, Gauteng
- Peacehaven, suburb of Pietermaritzburg, KwaZulu-Natal
- Peacehaven, suburb of Vereeniging, Gauteng
- Peacevale, KwaZulu-Natal
- Salem, Eastern Cape
- Salem, suburb of Hillcrest, KwaZulu-Natal
- Vrede, Free State
- Vrededorp, suburb of Johannesburg, Gauteng
- Vredefort, Free State
- Vredehoek, suburb of Cape Town, Western Cape
- Vredekloof, suburb of Brackenfell, Western Cape
- Vredelust, suburb of Bellville, Western Cape
- Vredenburg, Western Cape
- Vredendal, Western Cape
- Vredepark, suburb of Johannesburg, Gauteng
- Weltevredenpark, suburb of Roodepoort, Gauteng

=== Spain ===
- Badajoz, Spain (from Civitas Pacis, "town of peace" via Arabic)
- Salem, Valencia

=== Sri Lanka ===
- Shanthipura, Nuwara Eliya, Sri Lanka from Sanskrit 'Shanti' meaning peace

=== Sweden ===
- Fredhällsbron, a bridge in Stockholm
- Salem Municipality
- Salem, Sweden, the seat of Salem Municipality

=== Taiwan, ROC ===
- 二二八和平紀念公園, 228 Peace Memorial Park, Taipei
- 和平島, Keelung
- 安平镇, An-pêng, town in Tainan City, Taiwan
- 安平區, An-pêng district of Tainan City
- Anping Port (安平港), in Tainan
- Fort Zeelandia (Taiwan), or Fort Anping (安平古堡), the oldest colonial fortress in Taiwan
- Heping District, Taichung (和平區)
- Pingzhen District, district in Taoyuan City, formerly the town of Anping

=== Tanzania ===
- Dar-es-Salaam - Abode of Peace, Arabic

=== Thailand ===
- สวนสันติภาพ Santiphap Park, Bangkok
- On On Hotel, 安安, Phuket (Teochew)
- Santi Suk District of Nan Province.

=== United Kingdom ===
- Peacehaven, East Sussex
- Salem, Cornwall
- Salem, Greater Manchester, within Oldham, England
- Salem, village near Llandeilo, Wales
- Salem, above Penrhyn-coch, Wales
- Dunipace, Scotland (Hills of peace)

=== United States ===
- Echota, the old center of the Cherokee nation ()
- International Peace Garden, North Dakota
- La Paz County, Arizona
  - La Paz, Arizona, a ghost town
- La Paz, California, headquarters of the United Farm Workers
- La Paz, Indiana
- Friedenburg, Perry County, Missouri
- Friedensburg, Pennsylvania
- North Dakota, deemed Peace Garden State
- Pacific, Missouri
- Peacefield, the former home of presidents John Adams and John Quincy Adams
- Peace River, small river in south-central Florida
- On Lok Lifeways (Peace and Happiness in Cantonese), a senior health center in San Jose, California
- Salem, Alabama
- Salem, Fulton County, Arkansas, a city
- Salem, Saline County, Arkansas, a census-designated place
- Salem, Connecticut
- Salem, Florida
- Salem, Georgia
- Salem, Idaho, non-CDP community that straddles Fremont and Madison counties
- Salem, Illinois
- Salem, Adams County, Indiana, unincorporated place
- Salem, Jay County, Indiana, unincorporated place
- Salem, Union County, Indiana, unincorporated place
- Salem, Washington County, Indiana, city
- Salem, Iowa
- Salem, Kentucky
- Salem, Maryland
- Salem, Massachusetts
  - Salem Maritime National Historic Site
  - Salem witch trials
  - Salem Harbor
  - Salem Sound, a body of water
  - Salem Channel, a part of the Salem Sound
  - Salem (MBTA station)
- Salem Township, Washtenaw County, Michigan
- Salem, Missouri
- Salem, Nebraska
- Salem, New Hampshire
- Salem, New Jersey
  - Salem Nuclear Power Plant
  - Salem River, a tributary of the Delaware River
  - Port of Salem
- Salem, New Mexico
- Salem, New York, town in Washington County
  - Salem (village), New York, within the town of Salem
- Salem, an earlier name of Brocton, New York, in Chautauqua County
- Salem, North Carolina, census-designated place in Burke County
- Winston-Salem, North Carolina, in Forsyth County
  - Old Salem, a history museum in Winston-Salem
- Salem, Ohio
- Salem, Oklahoma
- Salem, Oregon, the state capital
  - Salem Metropolitan Statistical Area
  - Salem (Amtrak station), a railroad station
- Salem, Pennsylvania, four different unincorporated places
- Salem, South Carolina
- Salem, South Dakota
- Salem, Texas, eight different unincorporated places
- Salem, Utah
- Salem, Virginia, an independent city adjacent to Roanoke
- Salem, Virginia Beach, Virginia, a neighborhood
- Salem, West Virginia, a city in Harrison County
- Salem, Fayette County, West Virginia, an unincorporated community
- Salem, Wisconsin (disambiguation), several places in Wisconsin
- Waterton-Glacier International Peace Park, Montana

=== Ukraine ===
- Myrhorod, city in Poltava Oblast, Ukraine (means Peace City)
- Myrnohrad, city in Donetsk Oblast, Ukraine (means Peace City)
- Zhytomyr, city in Zhytomyr Oblast, Ukraine (means Peace of the tribe Zhytychi (part of the Drevlians) or rye (as a corn for living) and peace)
- there are 58 villages as Myrne (means Peace settlement) in 21 oblasts in Ukraine

=== Uruguay ===
- La Paz, Uruguay in the Canelones Department

=== Vietnam ===
- An Bình, Vietnam
- Hòa Bình, Hòa Bình Province, Vietnam
- Hội An (會安) translates as "peaceful meeting place".

=== Other ===
- Pacific Ocean
- Mare Tranquillitatis (Sea of Tranquility), on the Moon
- Mir Space Station

== List of places indirectly named after peace ==
- Islamabad, Pakistan
- Pacifica, California
- Pacific Beach, San Diego
- Pacific Beach, Washington
- Pacific City, Oregon
- Pacific Grove, California
- Pacific Heights, California
- Pacific Palisades, Los Angeles
- Solomon Islands
- Hanoi formerly Tống Bình (宋平, "Song peace") and Tràng An (long peace)

== See also ==
- Peace
- Š-L-M
