= Xiaguanying =

Xiaguanying (Chinese: 夏官营镇) may refer to one of the following towns in China:

- Xiaguanying, Lanzhou, a town of Yuzhong County, Lanzhou, Gansu
- Xiaguanying, Qian'an, a town of Qian'an, Tangshan, Hebei
