= Peace =

State of harmony in the absence of hostility and violence

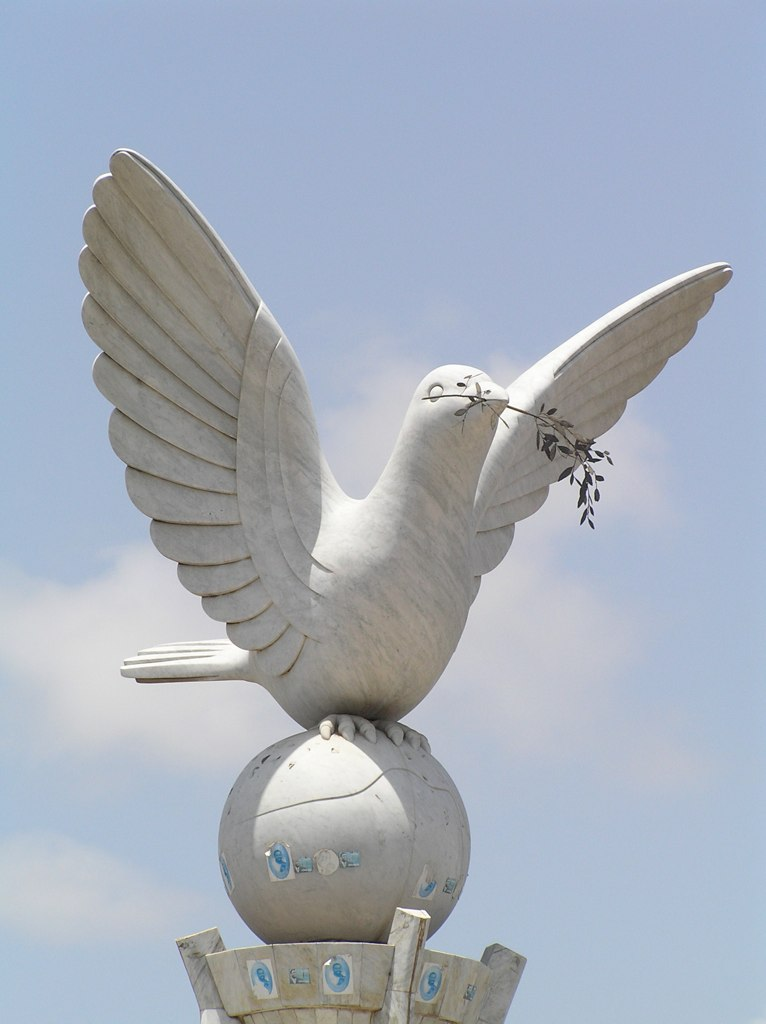
Peace dove statue in Lomé, Togo, Africa. The dove and the olive branch are the most common symbols associated with peace.

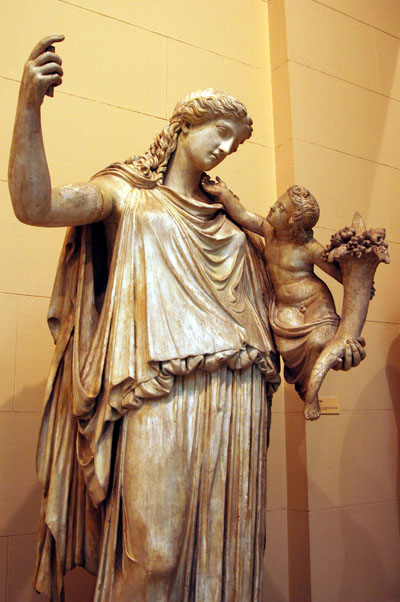
Statue of Eirene, goddess of peace in ancient Greek religion, with the infant Plutus

Peace is a state of harmony in the absence of hostility and violence. In a societal sense, peace is commonly used to mean a lack of conflict and freedom from fear of violence between individuals or groups.

Promotion of peace is a core tenet of many philosophies, religions, and ideologies. Some examples are: religions such as Buddhism, Christianity, Jainism, and Islam, important figures like Mahatma Gandhi and Martin Luther King Jr., and literary writings like "Perpetual Peace: A Philosophical Sketch" by Immanuel Kant, "The Art of Peace" by Morihei Ueshiba, or ideologies that strictly adhere to it such as Pacifism within a sociopolitical scope. It is a frequent subject of symbolism and features prominently in art and other cultural traditions.

The representation of peace has taken many diverse shapes and symbols based on culture, context, and history, each with their respective symbolism whose nature can be very complex. An example, being during post-violence, in contexts where intense emotions, these symbols can form to evoke unity and cooperation, described as to fill groups of people with pride and connection, yet the symbolism could also possibly form to convey oppression, hatred, or else. As such, a universal definition for peace does not concretely exist but gets expanded and defined proactively based on context and culture, in which it can serve many meanings not particularly benevolent in its symbolism.

"Psychological peace" (such as peaceful thinking and emotions) is less relatively well-defined, yet perhaps a necessary precursor to establishing "behavioural peace". Peaceful behaviour sometimes results from a "peaceful inner disposition". It has been argued by some that inner qualities such as tranquility, patience, respect, compassion, kindness, self-control, courage, moderation, forgiveness, equanimity, and the ability to see the big picture can promote peace within an individual, regardless of the external circumstances of their life.

== Etymology ==
Before the word 'peace' came into English lexicon, Anglo-Saxons used a phrase "friðu sibb" for "pledge of peace".

The term 'peace' originates from the Anglo-French pes, and the Old French pais, meaning "peace, reconciliation, silence, agreement" (11th century). Pes itself comes from the Latin pax, meaning "peace, compact, agreement, treaty of peace, tranquility, absence of hostility, harmony."

The English word came into use in various personal greetings from c. 1300 as a translation of the Hebrew word shalom, which, according to Jewish theology, comes from a Hebrew verb meaning 'to be complete, whole'. Although "peace" is the usual translation, shalom, which is also cognate with the Arabic word salaam, has multiple other meanings, including justice, good health, safety, well-being, prosperity, equity, security, good fortune, and friendliness, as well as "hello" and "goodbye".

On a personal level, peaceful behaviours are kind, considerate, respectful, just, and tolerant of others' beliefs and behaviors. This understanding of peace can also pertain to an individual's introspective sense or concept of themselves, as in being "at peace" in one's own mind, as found in European references from c. 1200. The early English term is also used in the sense of "quiet", reflecting calm, serene, and meditative approaches to family or group relationships that have an absence of quarreling, disturbances and agitation.

In many languages, the word 'peace' is also used as a greeting or a farewell, for example the Hawaiian word aloha, as well as the Arabic word salaam. In English the word peace is occasionally used as a farewell, especially for the dead, as in the phrases "rest in peace" or "peace out".

== History ==
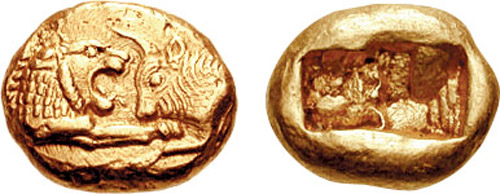
Croeseid coin of Croesus (c. 550 BCE), depicting the Lion and Bull — partly symbolizing alliance between Lydia and Greece, respectively

Peace was forged through diplomacy in the form of royal marriages, both in the distant past and in modern times. Two early examples of royal marriages being used to establish diplomatic relations are Hermodike I, who married the king of Phrygia around 800 BCE, and Hermodike II, who married the king of Lydia around 600 BCE. Both marriages involved Greek princesses from the house of Agamemnon and kings from what is now Turkey. The marriages between the Greek princesses and the kings of Phrygia and Lydia had a significant impact on the region, leading to the transfer of important technological innovations from Anatolia to Greece. In particular, the Phrygians introduced the Greek alphabet, while the Lydians pioneered the use of coinage as a form of currency. Both inventions were rapidly adopted by surrounding nations through further trade and cooperation.

Peace has not always been achieved through peaceful means; in many cases, it has been enforced by the victors of war, often through the use of violence and coercion. In his work Agricola, the Roman historian Tacitus writes about the greed and arrogance of the Roman Empire, portraying it as a ruthless and self-serving power. One quote, which Tacitus says is from the Caledonian chieftain Calgacus, ends with: "Auferre trucidare rapere falsis nominibus imperium, atque ubi solitudinem faciunt, pacem appellant." ("To ravage, to slaughter, to usurp under false titles, they call empire; and where they make a desert, they call it peace." —Oxford Revised Translation).

Discussion of peace is therefore at the same time an inquiry into its form. Societal peace can be seen at least in two forms:

1. A simple silence of arms, absence of war.
2. Absence of war accompanied by particular requirements for the mutual settlement of relations, which are characterized by justice, mutual respect, respect for law, and good will.

Since 1945, the United Nations and the United Nations Security Council have operated under the aim to resolve conflicts without war. Nonetheless, nations have entered numerous military conflicts since then.

== Organizations and prizes ==
=== United Nations ===
United Nations peacekeeping missions. Dark blue regions indicate current missions, while light blue regions represent former missions.

The United Nations (UN) is an international organization whose stated aims are to facilitate cooperation in international law, international security, economic development, social progress, human rights, and achieving world peace. The UN was founded in 1945 after World War II to replace the League of Nations, to stop wars between countries, and to provide a platform for dialogue.

After authorization by the Security Council, the UN sends peacekeepers to regions where armed conflict has recently ceased or paused to enforce the terms of peace agreements and to discourage combatants from resuming hostilities. Since the UN does not maintain its own military, peacekeeping forces are voluntarily provided by member states of the UN. The forces who enforce UN accords, also called the "Blue Helmets", are awarded United Nations Medals, which are considered international decorations instead of military decorations. The peacekeeping force as a whole received the Nobel Peace Prize in 1988.

=== Police ===
The obligation of the state to provide for domestic peace within its borders is usually charged to the police and other general domestic policing activities. The police are a constituted body of persons empowered by a state to enforce the law, to protect the lives, liberty and possessions of citizens, and to prevent crime and civil disorder. Their powers include the power of arrest and the legitimized use of force. The term is most commonly associated with the police forces of a sovereign state that are authorized to exercise the police power of that state within a defined legal or territorial area of responsibility. Police forces are often defined as being separate from the military and other organizations involved in the defense of the state against foreign aggressors; however, gendarmerie are military units charged with civil policing. Police forces are usually public sector services, funded through taxes.

=== National security ===
The national security apparatus of a nation is responsible for providing peace and security against foreign threats and aggression. National security can be threatened by a range of factors, including actions by other states (such as military or cyber attacks), violent non-state actors (such as terrorist attacks), organized criminal groups (such as drug cartels), and natural disasters (such as floods and earthquakes). Systemic drivers of insecurity, which may be transnational, include economic inequality and marginalisation, political exclusion, climate change, and nuclear proliferation. The preservation of peace and the security of a nation state has several dimensions, including economic security, energy security, physical security, environmental security, food security, border security, and cyber security. These dimensions correlate closely with elements of national power.

=== League of Nations ===
The principal forerunner of the United Nations was the League of Nations. It was created at the Paris Peace Conference of 1919, and emerged from the advocacy of Woodrow Wilson and other idealists during World War I. The Covenant of the League of Nations was included in the Treaty of Versailles in 1919, and the League was based in Geneva until its dissolution as a result of World War II and replacement by the United Nations. The high hopes widely held for the League in the 1920s, for example amongst members of the League of Nations Union, gave way to widespread disillusion in the 1930s as the League struggled to respond to challenges from Nazi Germany, Fascist Italy, and Japan.

The prominent scholar Alfred Eckhard Zimmern, who is widely regarded as one of the most influential intellectuals of the League of Nations, drew inspiration for his studies from the classics, along with other British scholars such as Gilbert Murray and Florence Stawell. This group of scholars is often referred to as the "Greece and peace" set, due to their shared interest in ancient Greek civilization and the promotion of peace.

The creation of the League of Nations, and the hope for informed public opinion on international issues (expressed for example by the Union for Democratic Control during World War I), also led to the creation after World War I of bodies dedicated to understanding international affairs, such as the Council on Foreign Relations in New York and the Royal Institute of International Affairs at Chatham House in London. At the same time, the academic study of international relations started to professionalise, with the first professorship of international politics created in 1919 at Aberystwyth University in Wales, named after Woodrow Wilson.

=== Olympic Games ===
The late 19th century idealist advocacy of peace which led to the creation of the Nobel Peace Prize, the Rhodes Scholarships, the Carnegie Endowment for International Peace, and ultimately the League of Nations, also saw the re-emergence of the ancient Olympic ideal. Led by Pierre de Coubertin, this culminated in the holding in 1896 of the first of the modern Olympic Games.

=== Nobel Peace Prize ===
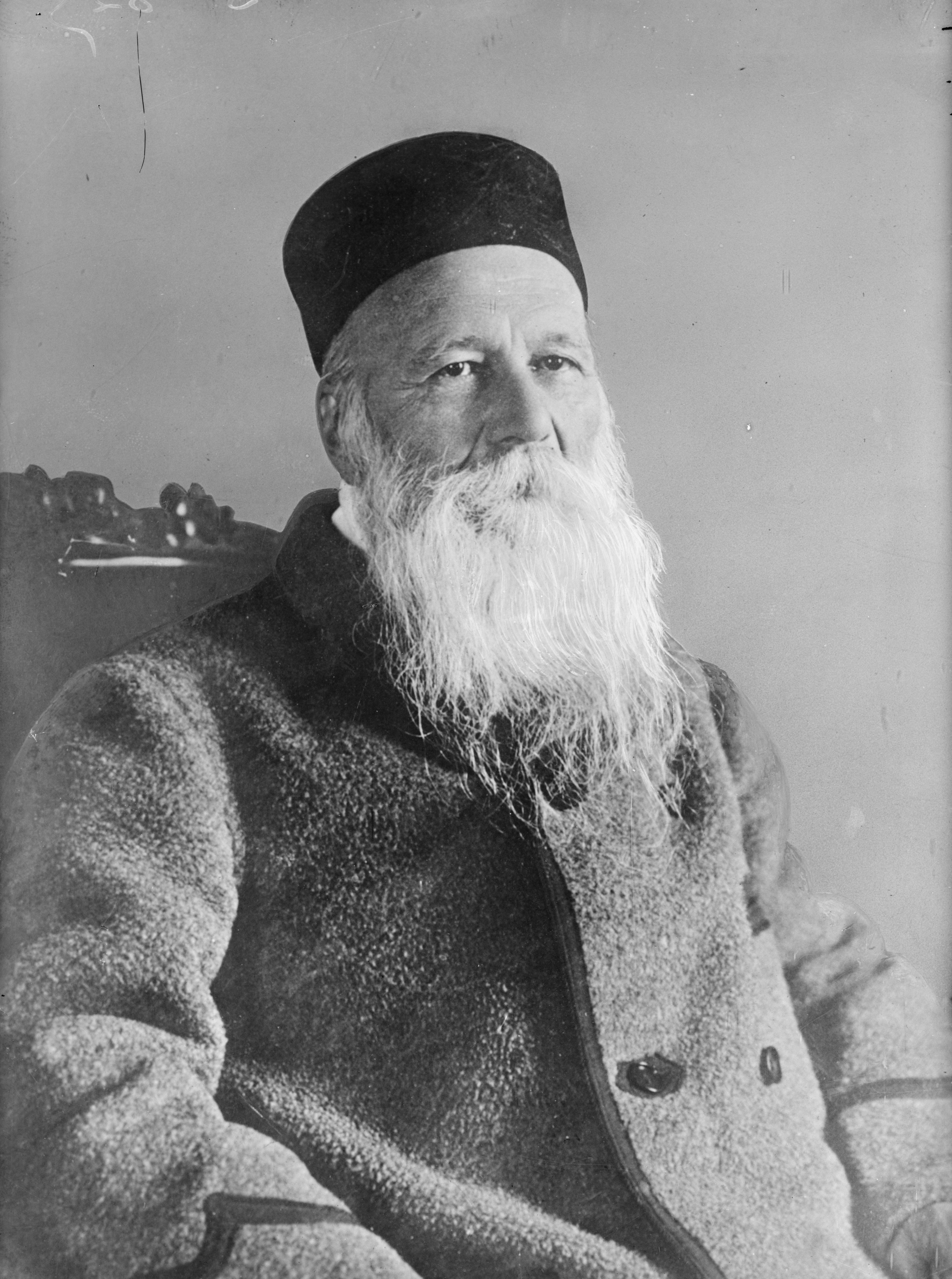
Henry Dunant was awarded the first Nobel Peace Prize for his role in founding the International Red Cross.

Since 1901, the Nobel Peace Prize has been the world's most prestigious honor given to individuals or organizations who have made significant contributions to peace. The prize is awarded by the Norwegian Nobel Committee, a group of five individuals chosen by the Norwegian parliament. Nominees for the prize come from around the world, and are often those who have worked to end conflict, protect human rights, or promote humanitarian efforts. It is awarded annually to internationally notable persons following the prize's creation in the will of Alfred Nobel. According to Nobel's will, the Peace Prize shall be awarded to the person who "...shall have done the most or the best work for fraternity between nations, for the abolition or reduction of standing armies, and for the holding and promotion of peace congresses."

=== Rhodes, Fulbright and Schwarzman scholarships ===
In creating the Rhodes Scholarships for outstanding students from the United States, Germany and much of the British Empire, Cecil Rhodes wrote in 1901 that "the object is that an understanding between the three great powers will render war impossible and educational relations make the strongest tie". This peace purpose of the Rhodes Scholarships was very prominent in the first half of the 20th century, and became prominent again in recent years under Warden of the Rhodes House Donald Markwell, a historian of thought about the causes of war and peace. This vision greatly influenced Senator J. William Fulbright in the goal of the Fulbright fellowships to promote international understanding and peace, and has guided many other international fellowship programs, including the Schwarzman Scholars to China created by Stephen A. Schwarzman in 2013.

=== Gandhi Peace Prize ===
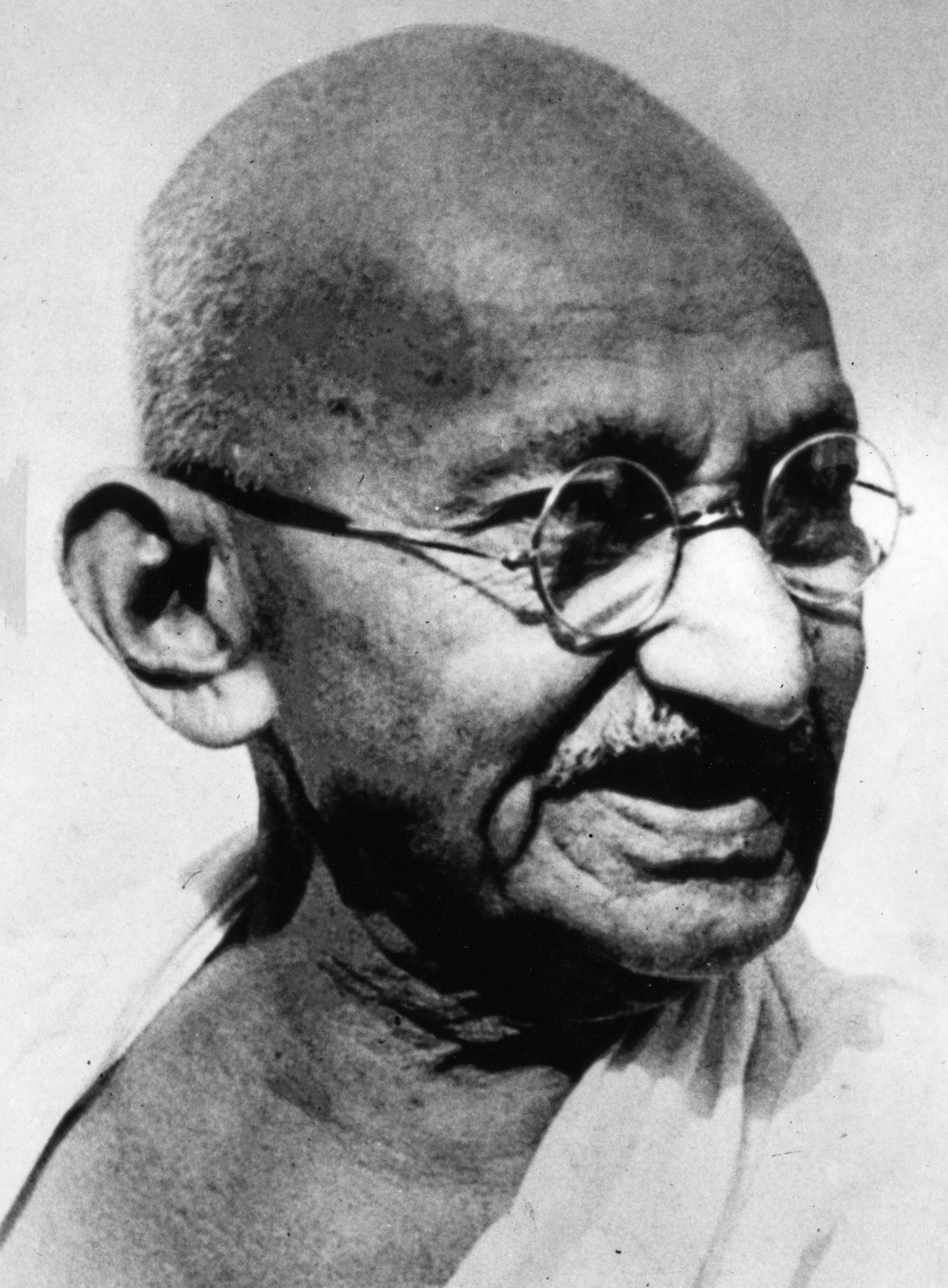
Mahatma Gandhi who the Gandhi Peace Prize is named after

The International Gandhi Peace Prize, named after Mahatma Gandhi, is awarded annually by the Government of India. It was launched as a tribute to the ideals espoused by Gandhi in 1995 on the occasion of the 125th anniversary of his birth. This is an annual award given to individuals and institutions for their contributions towards social, economic and political transformation through non-violence and other Gandhian methods. The award carries Rs. 10 million in cash, convertible in any currency in the world, a plaque and a citation. It is open to all persons regardless of nationality, race, creed or sex.

=== Student Peace Prize ===
The Student Peace Prize is awarded biennially to a student or a student organization that has made a significant contribution to promoting peace and human rights.

=== Ahmadiyya Muslim Peace Prize ===
The Ahmadiyya Muslim Peace Prize is awarded annually "in recognition of an individual's or an organisation's contribution for the advancement of the cause of peace". The prize was first launched in 2009 by the Ahmadiyya Muslim Peace Prize Committee under the directive of the caliph of the Ahmadiyya Muslim Community, Mirza Masroor Ahmad.

=== Culture of Peace News Network ===
The Culture of Peace News Network, otherwise known simply as CPNN, is a UN authorized interactive online news network committed to supporting the global movement for a culture of peace.

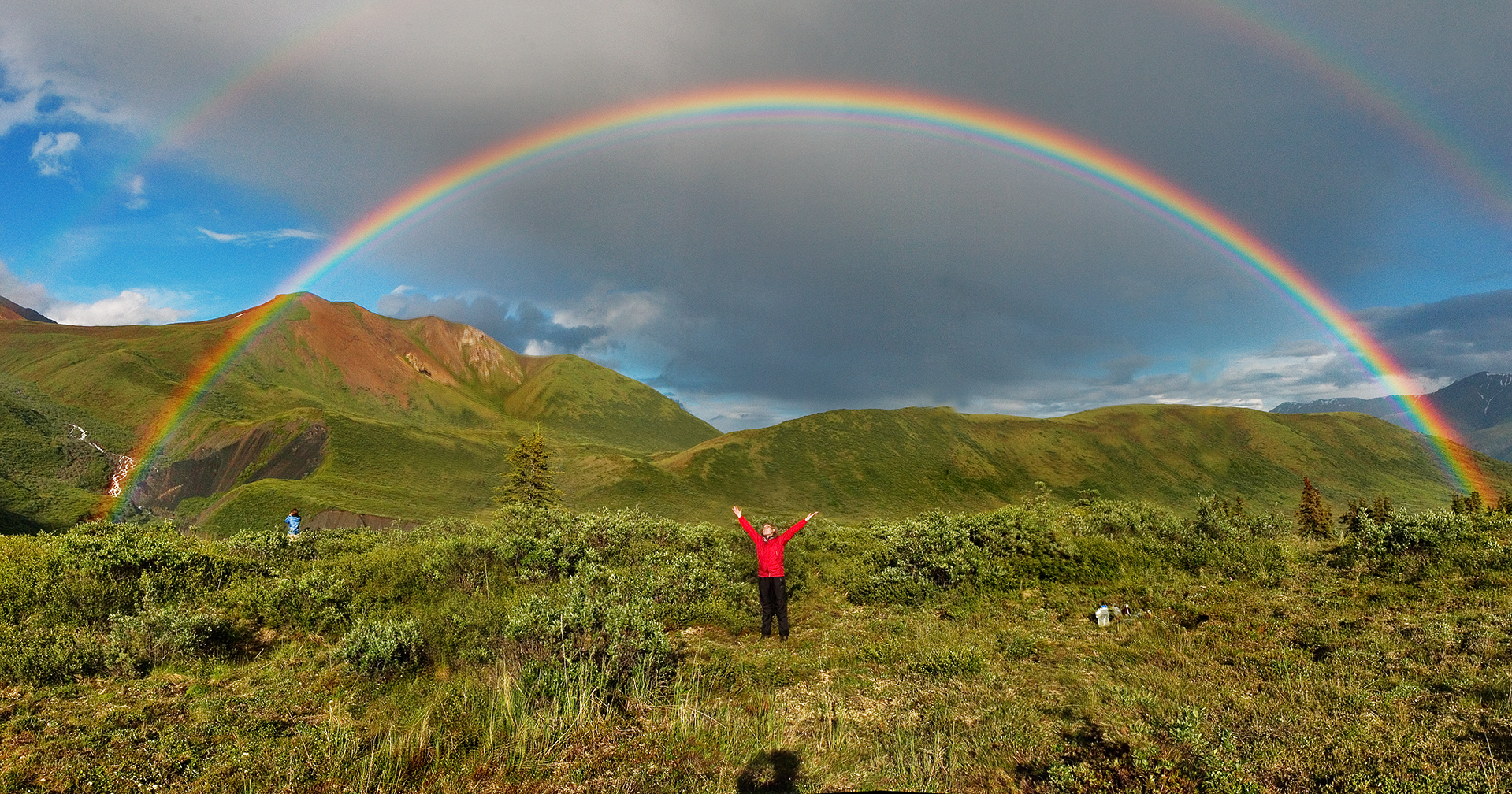
Rainbows are often used as a symbol of harmony and peace.

=== Sydney Peace Prize ===
Every year in the first week of November, the Sydney Peace Foundation presents the Sydney Peace Prize. The Sydney Peace Prize is awarded to an organization or an individual whose life and work has demonstrated significant contributions to the achievement of peace with justice locally, nationally or internationally; the promotion and attainment of human rights; or the philosophy, language and practice of non-violence.

=== Museums ===
A peace museum is a museum that documents historical peace initiatives. Many provide advocacy programs for nonviolent conflict resolution. This may include conflicts at the personal, regional or international level.

Smaller institutions include the Randolph Bourne Institute, the McGill Middle East Program of Civil Society and Peace Building and the International Festival of Peace Poetry.

== Religious beliefs ==
Religious beliefs often seek to identify and address the basic problems of human life, including conflicts between, among, and within persons and societies. In ancient Greek-speaking areas, the virtue of peace was personified as the goddess Eirene, and in Latin-speaking areas as the goddess Pax. Her image was typically represented by ancient sculptors as a full-grown woman, usually with a horn of plenty and scepter and sometimes with a torch or olive leaves.

=== Christianity ===
Christians, who believe Jesus of Nazareth to be the Jewish Messiah called Christ (meaning Anointed One), interpret Isaiah 9:6 as a messianic prophecy of Jesus in which he is called the "Prince of Peace". In the Gospel of Luke, Zechariah celebrates his son John: "And you, child, will be called the prophet of the Most High; for you will go before the Lord to prepare his ways, to give knowledge of salvation to his people by the forgiveness of their sins. By the tender mercy of our God, the dawn from on high will break upon us, to give light to those who sit in darkness and in the shadow of death, to guide our feet into the way of peace."

Centuries later during the Medieval era, the exhortation for peace found within the Gospel of St. Matthew also served as the basis for the condemnation of war expressed by St. Francis of Assisi. Disillusioned with his own military service as a youth during Pope Innocent III's Fourth Crusade, Francis urged his disciples to follow in the steps of St. Matthew by observing ""Blessed are the peacemakers, for they shall be called children of God ((Mt.5.9). They are truly peacemakers who are able to preserve their peace of mind and heart for love of our Lord Jesus Christ, despite all they suffer in this world."

As a testimony of peace, Peace Churches in the Anabaptist Christian tradition (such as the Mennonites and Quakers), as well Holiness Methodist Pacifists (such as the Immanuel Missionary Church), practice nonresistance and do not participate in warfare.

In the Catholic Church, numerous pontifical documents on the Holy Rosary document a continuity of views of the Popes to have confidence in the Holy Rosary as a means to foster peace. In the Encyclical Mense maio, 1965, in which he urged the practice of the Holy Rosary, and as reaffirmed in the encyclical Christi Matri, 1966, to implore peace, Pope Paul VI stated in the apostolic Recurrens mensis, October 1969, that the Rosary is a prayer that favors the great gift of peace.

=== Hinduism ===
Hindu texts contain the following passages:

May there be peace in the heavens, peace in the atmosphere, peace on the earth. Let there be coolness in the water, healing in the herbs and peace radiating from the trees. Let there be harmony in the planets and in the stars, and perfection in eternal knowledge. May everything in the universe be at peace. Let peace pervade everywhere, at all times. May I experience that peace within my own heart.

— Yajur Veda 36.17

Let us have concord with our own people, and concord with people who are strangers to us. Ashwins (Celestial Twins) create between us and the strangers a unity of hearts. May we unite in our minds, unite in our purposes, and not fight against the heavenly spirit within us. Let not the battle-cry rise amidst many slain, nor the arrows of the war-god fall with the break of day

— Yajur Veda 7.52

A superior being does not render evil for evil. This is a maxim one should observe... One should never harm the wicked or the good or even animals meriting death. A noble soul will exercise compassion even towards those who enjoy injuring others or cruel deeds... Who is without fault?

— Valmiki, Ramayana

The chariot that leads to victory is of another kind.

Valour and fortitude are its wheels; Truthfulness and virtuous conduct are its banner; Strength, discretion, self-restraint and benevolence are its four horses, Harnessed with the cords of forgiveness, compassion and equanimity...

Whoever has this righteous chariot, has no enemy to conquer anywhere.

— Valmiki, Ramayana

=== Buddhism ===
Buddhists believe that peace is attained by ending pain and suffering. They regard pain and suffering is stemming from cravings (in the extreme, greed), aversions (fears), and delusions and suffering is attachments to outcomes. To eliminate such pain and suffering and achieve personal peace, followers in the path of the Buddha adhere to a set of teachings called the Four Noble Truths — a central tenet in Buddhist philosophy.

=== Islam ===
Islam derived from the root word salam which literally means peace. Quran states "those who believe and whose hearts find comfort in the remembrance of Allah. Surely in the remembrance of Allah do hearts find comfort." and stated "O believers! When you are told to make room in gatherings, then do so. Allah will make room for you ˹in His grace˺. And if you are told to rise, then do so. Allah will elevate those of you who are faithful, and ˹raise˺ those gifted with knowledge in rank. And Allah is All-Aware of what you do."

=== Judaism ===
The Judaic tradition associates God with peace, as evidenced by various principles and laws in Judaism.

Shalom, the biblical and modern Hebrew word for peace, is one of the names for God according to the Judaic law and tradition. For instance, in traditional Jewish law, individuals are prohibited from saying "Shalom" when they are in the bathroom as there is a prohibition on uttering any of God's names in the bathroom, out of respect for the divine name.

Jewish liturgy and prayer is replete with prayers asking God to establish peace in the world. The שמונה עשרה, a key prayer in Judaism that is recited three times each day, concludes with a blessing for peace. The last blessing of the שמונה עשרה, also known as the Amida ("standing" as the prayer is said while standing), is focused on peace, beginning and ending with supplications for peace and blessings.

Peace is central to Judaism's core principle of מָשִׁיחַ ("messiah") which connotes a time of universal peace and abundance, a time when weapons will be turned into plowshares and lions will sleep with lambs. As it is written in the Book of Isaiah:

They shall beat their swords into plowshares and their spears into pruning hooks; nation will not lift sword against nation and they will no longer study warfare.

— Isaiah 2:4

The wolf will live with the lamb, the leopard will lie down with the goat, the calf and the lion and the yearling together; and a little child will lead them. The cow will feed with the bear, their young will lie down together, and the lion will eat straw like the ox. The infant will play near the hole of the cobra, and the young child put his hand into the viper's nest. They will neither harm nor destroy on all my holy mountain, for the earth will be full of the knowledge of the Lord as the waters cover the sea.

— Isaiah 11:6–9

This last metaphor from Tanakh (Hebrew bible) symbolizes the peace by which a longed-for messianic age will be characterized, a peace in which natural enemies, the strong and the weak, predator and prey, will live in harmony.

Jews pray for the messianic age of peace every day in the מָשִׁיחַ, in addition to faith in the coming of the messianic age constituting one of the thirteen core principles of faith in Judaism, according to Maimonides.

== Ideological beliefs ==
=== Pacifism ===
A peace sign, which is widely associated with pacifism

Pacifism is the categorical opposition to the behaviors of war or violence as a means of settling disputes or of gaining advantage. Pacifism covers a spectrum of views ranging from the belief that international disputes can and should all be resolved via peaceful behaviors; to calls for the abolition of various organizations which tend to institutionalize aggressive behaviors, such as the military, or arms manufacturers; to opposition to any organization of society that might rely in any way upon governmental force. Groups that sometimes oppose the governmental use of force include anarchists and libertarians. Absolute pacifism opposes violent behavior under all circumstance, including defense of self and others.

Pacifism may be based on moral principles (a deontological view) or pragmatism (a consequentialist view). Principled pacifism holds that all forms of violent behavior are inappropriate responses to conflict, and are morally wrong. Pragmatic pacifism holds that the costs of war and inter-personal violence are so substantial that better ways of resolving disputes must be found.

=== Inner peace, meditation and prayerfulness ===
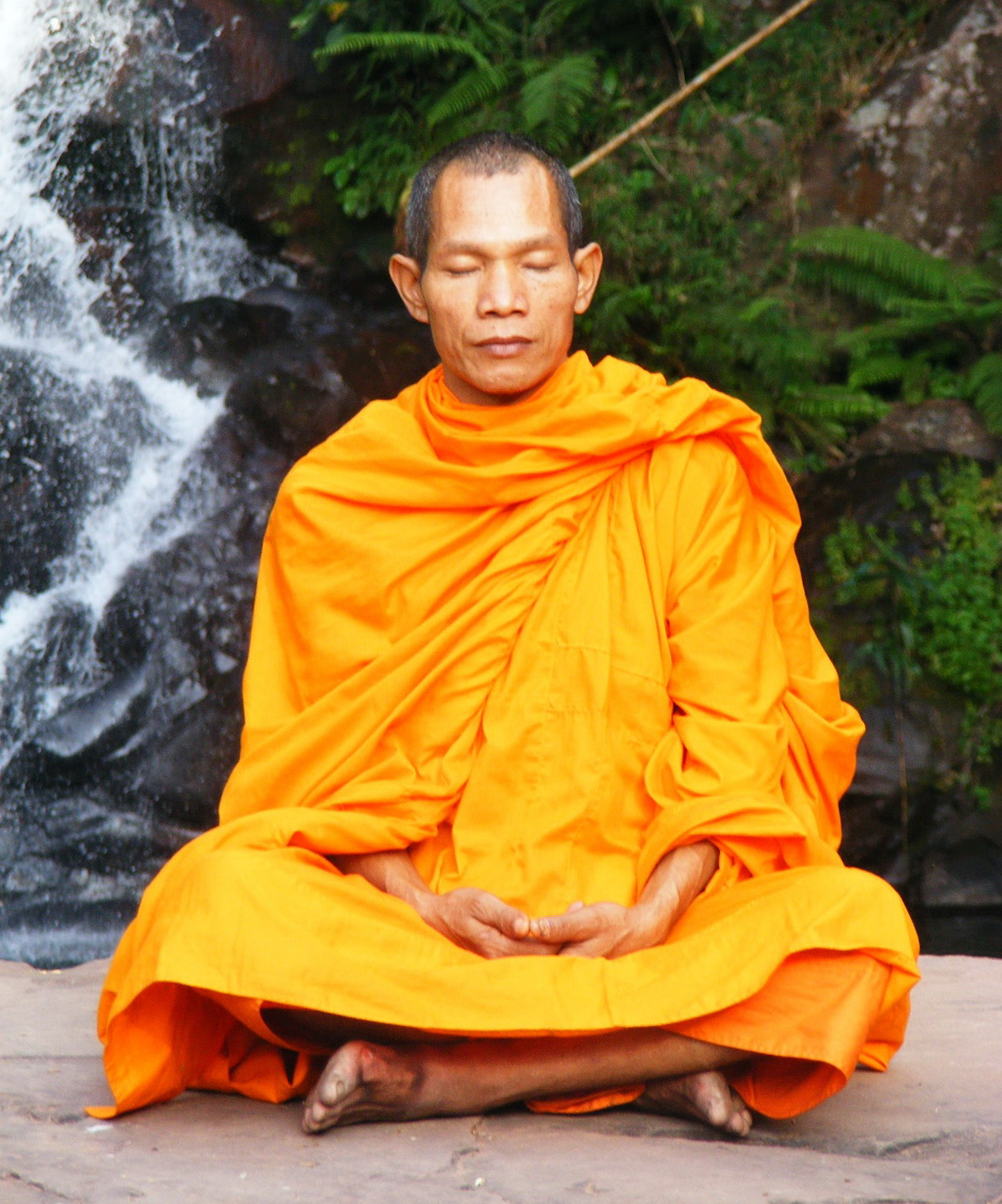
Buddhist monk during meditation near Phu Soidao National Park, 2009

Psychological or inner peace (i.e. peace of mind) refers to a state of being internally or spiritually at peace, with sufficient clarity of knowledge and understanding to remain calm in the face of apparent discord, stress and discomfort. Being internally "at peace" is considered to be a healthy playable mental state, a homeostasis of emotions and to be the opposite of feeling stressful, mentally anxious, or emotionally unstable. Within meditative traditions, the achievement of "peace of mind" is often associated with bliss and happiness.

Peace of mind, serenity, and calmness are descriptions of a disposition free from the effects of stress. In some meditative traditions, inner peace is believed to be a state of consciousness or enlightenment that may be cultivated by various types of meditation, prayer, tai chi, yoga, or other various types of mental or physical disciplines. Many such practices refer to this peace as an experience of knowing oneself. An emphasis on finding inner peace is often associated with traditions such as Buddhism, Hinduism, and some traditional Christian contemplative practices such as monasticism, as well as with the New Age movement.

=== Non-aggression principle ===
The non-aggression principle asserts that aggression against an individual or an individual's property is always an immoral violation of life, liberty, and property rights. Utilizing deceit instead of consent to achieve ends is also a violation of the Non-Aggression Principle. Therefore, under the framework of this principle, rape, murder, deception, involuntary taxation, government regulation, and other behaviors that initiate aggression against otherwise peaceful individuals are considered violations.

=== Satyagraha ===
Satyagraha is a philosophy and practice of nonviolent resistance developed by Mahatma Gandhi. He deployed satyagraha techniques in campaigns for Indian independence and also during his earlier struggles in South Africa.

The word satyagraha itself was coined through a public contest that Gandhi sponsored through the newspaper he published in South Africa, Indian Opinion, when he realized that neither the common, contemporary Hindu language nor the English language contained a word which fully expressed his own meanings and intentions when he talked about his nonviolent approaches to conflict. According to Gandhi's autobiography, the contest winner was Maganlal Gandhi (presumably no relation), who submitted the entry 'sadagraha', which Gandhi then modified to 'satyagraha'. Etymologically, this Hindic word means 'truth-firmness', and is commonly translated as 'steadfastness in the truth' or 'truth-force'.

Satyagraha theory also influenced Martin Luther King Jr., James Bevel, and others during the campaigns they led during the civil rights movement in the United States. The theory of satyagraha sees means and ends as inseparable. Therefore, it is contradictory to try to use violence to obtain peace. As Gandhi wrote: "They say, 'means are, after all, means'. I would say, 'means are, after all, everything'. As the means so the end..." A quote sometimes attributed to Gandhi, but also to A. J. Muste, sums it up: "There is no way to peace; peace is the way".

== Monuments ==
The following are monuments to peace:

Name	Location	Organization	Meaning	Image
Twelve Metal Colossi	Epang Palace, Xi'an	Emperor of China	Following the Qin universal conquest and symbolizing the universal pacification, the First Emperor collected all metal weapons of former Warring States as no longer necessary and melted them into twelve statues and bells.	No illustrations have survived
Ara Pacis	Rome, Italy	Roman Senate	The monument of peace was preferred over the traditional triumphal arch as Augustus emphasized the achievement of universal peace over Roman military victory.	
Dirk Willems Peace Garden	Steinbach, Manitoba	Mennonite Heritage Village	A peace garden telling the story of Dirk Willems; a place for reflection and contemplation on what it means to live a life of radical peacemaking.	
Japanese Garden of Peace	Fredericksburg, Texas	National Museum of the Pacific War	A gift from the people of Japan to the people of the United States, presented to honor Chester W. Nimitz and created as a respite from the intensity of violence, destruction, and loss.	
Japanese Peace Bell	New York City, NY	United Nations	World peace	
Fountain of Time	Chicago, IL	Chicago Park District	100 years of peace between the US and UK	
Fredensborg Palace	Fredensborg, Denmark	Frederick IV	The peace between Denmark–Norway and Sweden, after Great Northern War which was signed 3 July 1720 on the site of the unfinished palace.	
International Peace Garden	North Dakota, Manitoba	non-profit organization	Peace between the US and Canada, World peace	
Peace Arch	border between US and Canada, near Surrey, British Columbia.	non-profit organization	Built to honour the first 100 years of peace between Great Britain and the United States resulting from the signing of the Treaty of Ghent in 1814.	
Shanti Stupa	Pokhara, Nepal	Nipponzan-Myōhōji-Daisanga	One of eighty Peace Pagodas in the World.	
Statue of Europe	Brussels	European Commission	Unity in Peace in Europe	
Waterton-Glacier International Peace Park	Alberta, Montana	non-profit organization	World Peace	

== Theories ==
Many different theories of "peace" exist in the world of peace studies, which involves the study of de-escalation, conflict transformation, disarmament, and cessation of violence. The definition of "peace" can vary with religion, culture, or subject of study.

=== Balance of power ===
The classical "realist" position is that the key to promoting order between states, and so of increasing the chances of peace, is the maintenance of a balance of power between states – a situation where no state is so dominant that it can "lay down the law to the rest". Exponents of this view have included Metternich, Bismarck, Hans Morgenthau, and Henry Kissinger. A related approach – more in the tradition of Hugo Grotius than Thomas Hobbes – was articulated by the so-called "English school of international relations theory" such as Martin Wight in his book Power Politics (1946, 1978) and Hedley Bull in The Anarchical Society (1977).

As the maintenance of a balance of power could in some circumstances require a willingness to go to war, some critics saw the idea of a balance of power as promoting war rather than promoting peace. This was a radical critique of those supporters of the Allied and Associated Powers who justified entry into World War I on the grounds that it was necessary to preserve the balance of power in Europe from a German bid for hegemony.

In the second half of the 20th century, and especially during the Cold War, a particular form of balance of power – mutual nuclear deterrence – emerged as a widely held doctrine on the key to peace between the great powers. Critics argued that the development of nuclear stockpiles increased the chances of war rather than peace, and that the "nuclear umbrella" made it "safe" for smaller wars (e.g. the Vietnam War and the Soviet invasion of Czechoslovakia to end the Prague Spring), so making such wars more likely. Similarly, other critics such as Robert L. Holmes utilize a reductio ad absurdum argument to note that any reliance upon a strategy of mutual nuclear deterrence as a means to prevent nuclear war itself is irrational at best in so far as it requires the utilization of the very instruments of war which it seeks to avoid implementing, while also failing to demonstrate an inherent effectiveness in preventing war in either the past, present or future frames of reference.

=== Appeasement and deterrence ===
Appeasement is a strategy to achieve peace by making political, material, or territorial concessions to an aggressive power. Deterrence is a strategy to achieve peace by using threats or limited force to dissuade an actor from escalating conflict, typically because the prospective attacker believes that the probability of success is low and the costs of attack are high.

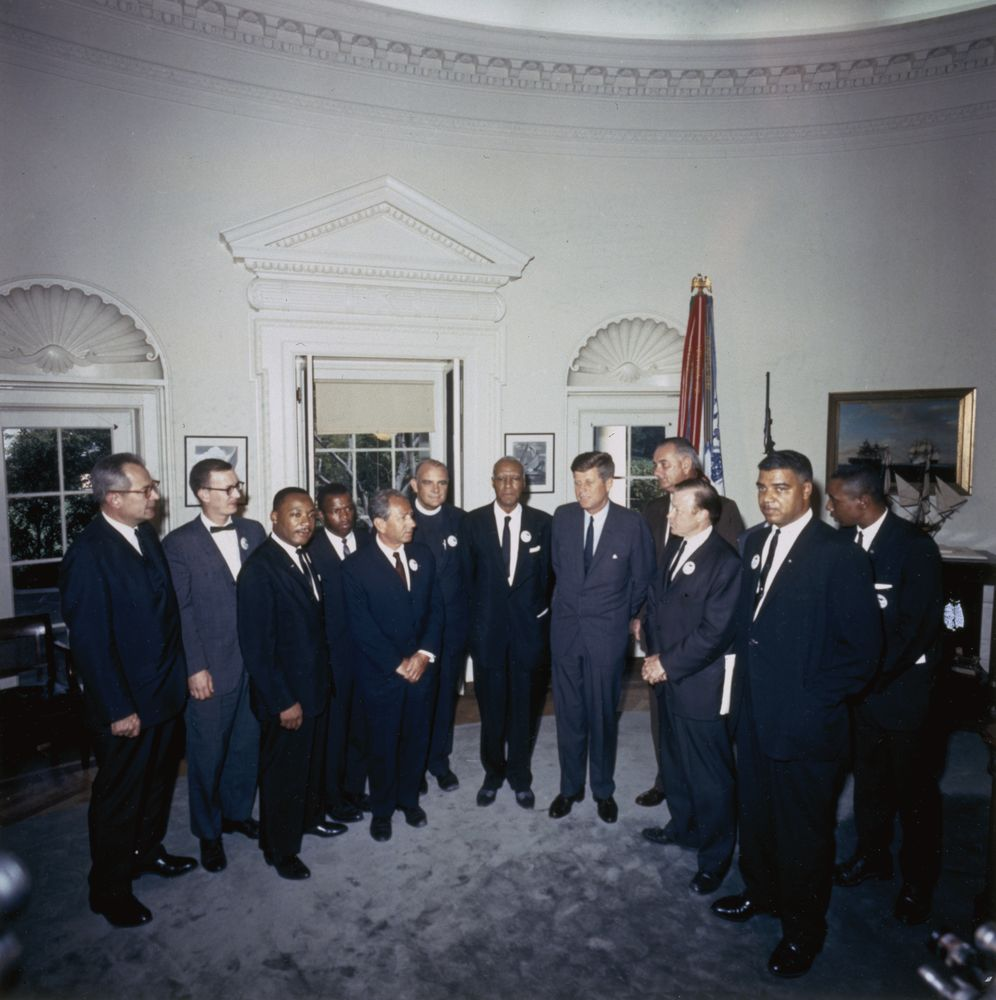
Civil rights leaders (including Martin Luther King Jr.) meeting with President John F. Kennedy during the 1963 March on Washington is an example of the "speaking truth to power" peace tactic.

=== Speaking truth to power ===
Speaking truth to power is a non-violent political tactic, employed by dissidents against the received wisdom or propaganda of governments they regard as oppressive, authoritarian or an ideocracy. Practitioners who have campaigned for a more just and truthful world have included Apollonius of Tyana, Václav Havel, Nelson Mandela, Archbishop Desmond Tutu, Mahatma Gandhi, Bacha Khan, and the Dalai Lama.

The phrase originated with a pamphlet, Speak Truth to Power: a Quaker Search for an Alternative to Violence, published by the American Friends Service Committee in 1955. A contributor of the pamphlet's contents was civil rights activist Bayard Rustin.

=== Free trade and interdependence ===
It was a central tenet of classical liberalism, for example among English liberal thinkers of the late 19th and early 20th century, that free trade promoted peace. For example, the Cambridge economist John Maynard Keynes (1883–1946) said that he was "brought up" on this idea and held it unquestioned until at least the 1920s. During the economic globalization in the decades leading up to World War I, writers such as Norman Angell argued that the growth of economic interdependence between the great powers made war between them futile and therefore unlikely. He made this argument in 1913. A year later Europe's economically interconnected states were embroiled in what would later become known as the First World War.

=== Democratic peace theory ===
The democratic peace theory posits that democracy causes peace (between democracies) because of the accountability, institutions, values, and norms of democratic countries.

=== Territorial peace theory ===
The territorial peace theory posits that peace causes democracy because territorial wars between neighbor countries lead to authoritarian attitudes and disregard for democratic values. This theory is supported by historical studies showing that countries rarely become democratic until after their borders have been settled by territorial peace with neighbor countries.

=== Peace war game ===
The Peace and War Game is an approach in game theory to understand the relationship between peace and conflicts.

The iterated game hypotheses was originally used by academic groups and computer simulations to study possible strategies of cooperation and aggression.

As peace makers became richer over time, it became clear that making war had greater costs than initially anticipated. One of the well studied strategies that acquired wealth more rapidly was based on Genghis Khan, i.e. a constant aggressor making war continually to gain resources. This led, in contrast, to the development of what's known as the "provokable nice guy strategy", a peace-maker until attacked, improved upon merely to win by occasional forgiveness even when attacked. By adding the results of all pairwise games for each player, one sees that multiple players gain wealth cooperating with each other while bleeding a constantly aggressive player.

=== Socialism and managed capitalism ===
Socialist, communist, and left-wing liberal writers of the 19th and 20th centuries (e.g., Lenin, J.A. Hobson, John Strachey) argued that capitalism caused war (e.g. through promoting imperial or other economic rivalries that lead to international conflict). This led some to argue that international socialism was the key to peace.

However, in response to such writers in the 1930s who argued that capitalism caused war, the economist John Maynard Keynes (1883–1946) argued that managed capitalism could promote peace. This involved international coordination of fiscal/monetary policies, an international monetary system that did not pit the interests of countries against each other, and a high degree of freedom of trade. These ideas underlay Keynes's work during World War II that led to the creation of the International Monetary Fund and the World Bank at Bretton Woods in 1944, and later of the General Agreement on Tariffs and Trade (subsequently the World Trade Organization).

=== International organization and law ===
One of the most influential theories of peace, especially since Woodrow Wilson led the creation of the League of Nations at the Paris Peace Conference of 1919, is that peace will be advanced if the intentional anarchy of states is replaced through the growth of international law promoted and enforced through international organizations such as the League of Nations, the United Nations, and other functional international organizations. One of the most important early exponents of this view was Alfred Eckhart Zimmern, for example in his 1936 book The League of Nations and the Rule of Law.

=== Trans-national solidarity ===
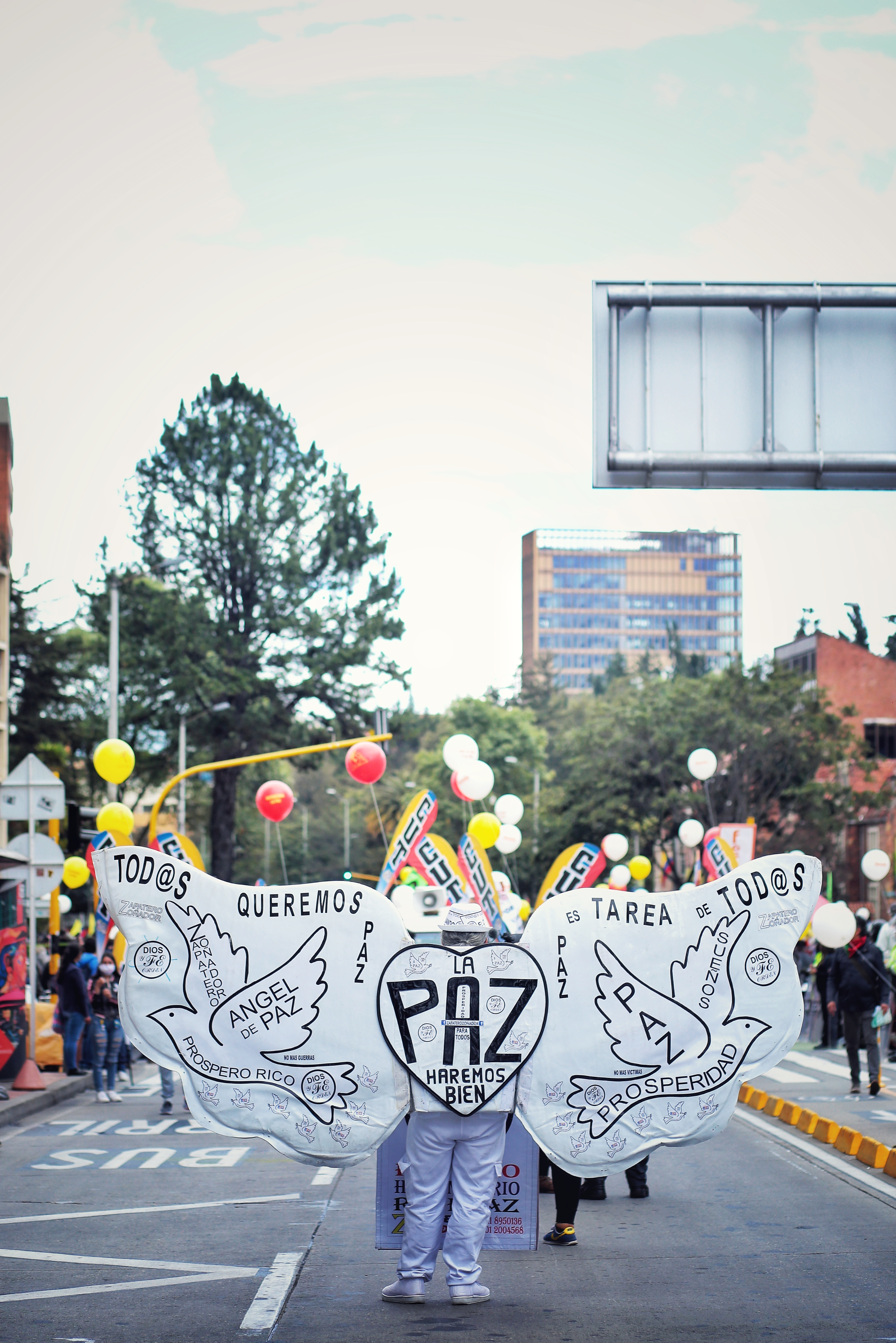
An anti-war activist with a homemade costume during an event in Colombia, 2020

Many "idealist" thinkers about international relations – e.g. in the traditions of Kant and Karl Marx – have argued that the key to peace is the growth of some form of solidarity between peoples (or classes of people) spanning the lines of cleavage between nations or states that lead to war.

One version of this is the idea of promoting international understanding between nations through the international mobility of students – an idea most powerfully advanced by Cecil Rhodes in the creation of the Rhodes Scholarships, and his successors such as J. William Fulbright.

Another theory is that peace can be developed among countries on the basis of active management of water resources.

== Day ==
World Peace Day, celebrated on 21 September, was founded as a day to recognize, honour and promote peace.

== Studies, rankings, and periods ==
=== Peace and conflict studies ===
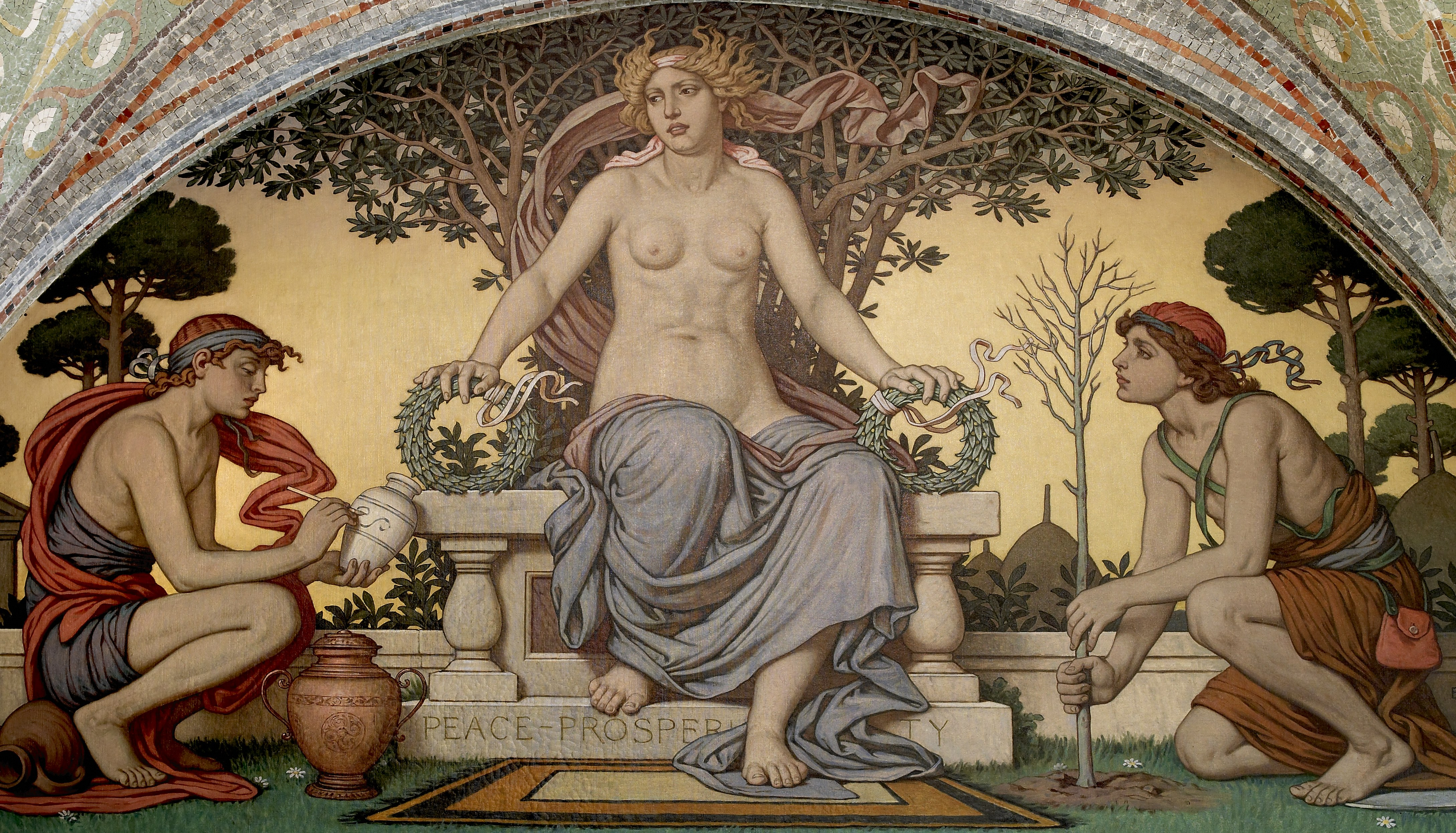
Detail from Peace and Prosperity (1896), Elihu Vedder, Library of Congress Thomas Jefferson Building, Washington, D.C.

Peace and conflict studies is an academic field which identifies and analyses violent and nonviolent behaviours, as well as the structural mechanisms attending violent and non-violent social conflicts. This is to better understand the processes leading to a more desirable human condition. One variation, Peace studies (irenology), is an interdisciplinary effort aiming at the prevention, de-escalation, and solution of conflicts. This contrasts with war studies (polemology), directed at the efficient attainment of victory in conflicts. Disciplines involved may include political science, geography, economics, psychology, sociology, international relations, history, anthropology, religious studies, and gender studies, as well as a variety of other disciplines.

=== Measurement and ranking ===
Although peace is widely perceived as something intangible, various organizations have been making efforts to quantify and measure it. The Global Peace Index produced by the Institute for Economics and Peace is a known effort to evaluate peacefulness in countries based on 23 indicators of the absence of violence and absence of the fear of violence.

The 2015 edition of the Index ranked 163 countries on their internal and external levels of peace. According to the 2017 Global Peace Index, Iceland is the most peaceful country in the world while Syria is the least peaceful one. Fragile States Index (formerly known as the Failed States Index) created by the Fund for Peace focuses on risk for instability or violence in 178 nations. This index measures how fragile a state is by 12 indicators and subindicators that evaluate aspects of politics, social economy, and military facets in countries. The 2015 Failed State Index reports that the most fragile nation is South Sudan, and the least fragile one is Finland. University of Maryland publishes the Peace and Conflict Instability Ledger in order to measure peace. It grades 163 countries with 5 indicators, and pays the most attention to risk of political instability or armed conflict over a three-year period. The most recent ledger shows that the most peaceful country is Slovenia on the contrary Afghanistan is the most conflicted nation. Besides indicated above reports from the Institute for Economics and Peace, Fund for Peace, and University of Maryland, other organizations including George Mason University release indexes that rank countries in terms of peacefulness.

=== Long periods ===
The longest continuing period of peace and neutrality among currently existing states is observed in Sweden since 1814 and in Switzerland, which has had an official policy of neutrality since 1815. This was made possible partly by the periods of relative peace in Europe and the world known as Pax Britannica (1815–1914), Pax Europaea/Pax Americana (since the 1950s), and Pax Atomica (also since the 1950s).

Other examples of long periods of peace are:

- the isolationistic Edo period (also known as Tokugawa shogunate) in Japan 1603 to 1868 (265 years)
- Pax Khazarica in Khazar Khanate about 700–950 CE (250 years)
- Pax Romana in the Roman empire (for 190 or 206 years).

== See also ==
- Anti-war – Social movement opposed to armed conflicts
- Catholic peace traditions – Aspect of Catholic teachings
- Grey-zone (international relations) – State between peace and war
- List of anti-war songs
- List of peace activists
- List of places named Peace
- List of peace prizes
- Moral syncretism
- Nonkilling – Approach to nonviolence
- Nonviolence – Principle or practice of not causing harm to others
- Peace education – Interdisciplinary approach to pedagogy of violent conflict and social injustice
- Peace in Islamic philosophy
- Peace Journalism – Style and theory of reporting
- Peace makers
- Peace One Day – Nonprofit organization
- Peace Palace – International law administrative building in The Hague, Netherlands
- Peace symbol – Symbols to promote peace
- Prayer for Peace
- Structural violence – Form of violence
- Sulh – Arabic term used in Islamic jurisprudence
- Turn the other cheek – Phrase from the Sermon on the Mount in Christian doctrine
- War resister – Person who resists war
