= Yuzhong =

Yuzhong may refer to two county-level divisions in the PRC:

- Yuzhong County (榆中县), of Lanzhou, Gansu
- Yuzhong District (渝中区), Chongqing
