= Jinya, Yuzhong =

Jinya 金崖镇
- Town
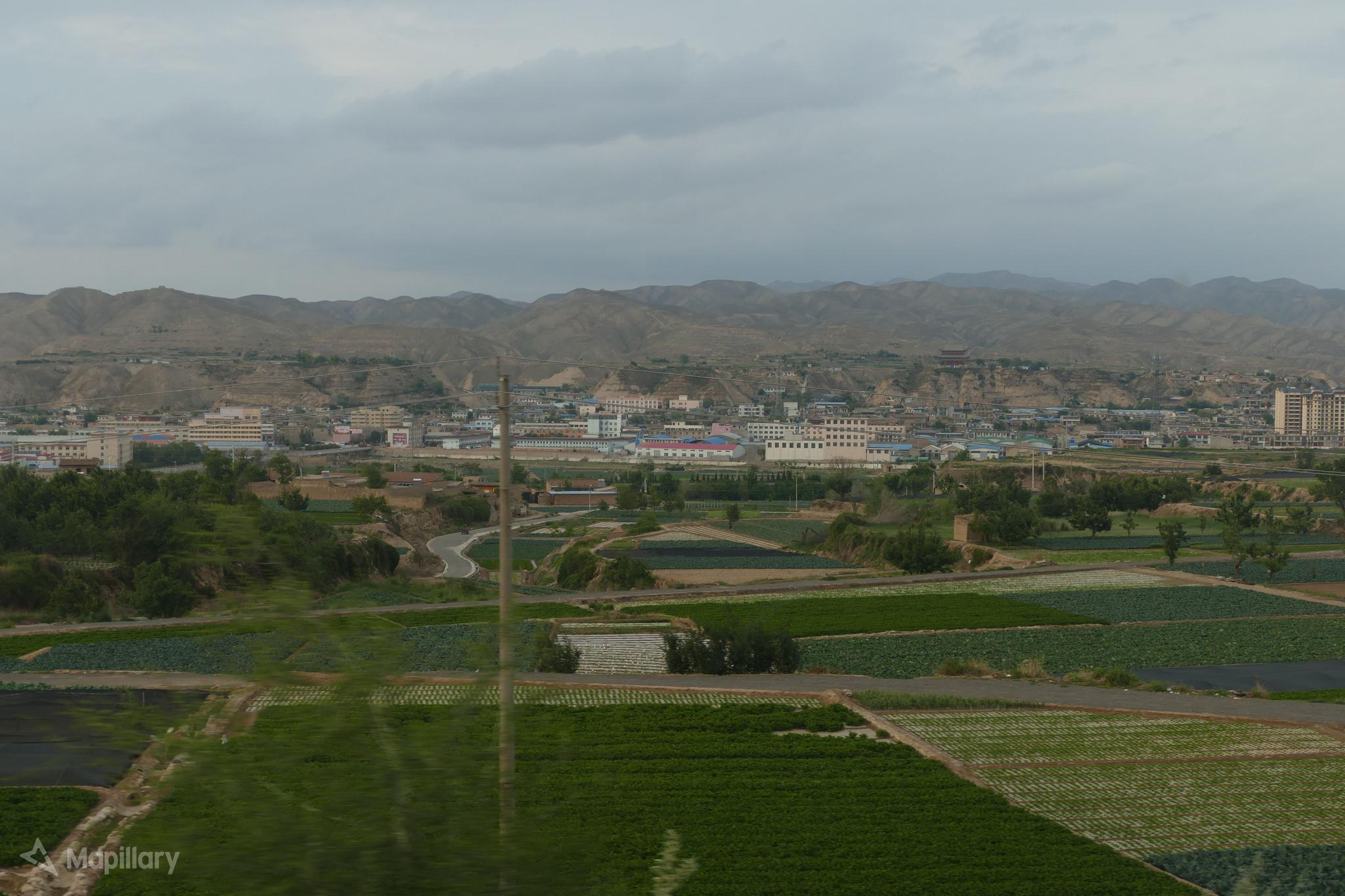

- Location within Gansu Location within China
- Coordinates: 36.0187430°N 104.0960141°E
- Country: China
- Province: Gansu
- Prefecture-level city: Lanzhou
- County: Yuzhong

Area
  - Total: 260 km^{2} (100 sq mi)

Population (2018)
  - Total: 25,948

Jinya is a town in Yuzhong County, Lanzhou, China. It administers 17 villages.

A Great Wall watchtower is preserved in Jinya and it is also home to 49 historical courtyard style houses.
