= International Festival of Peace Poetry =

International festival in Iran

The International Festival of Peace Poetry (Persian: جشنواره بین المللی شعر صلح) is an international festival held biannually in Iran. The first Peace Poetry Festival was held in Tehran on May 16, 2007, with poets from sixteen countries participating, and the second Festival was held on May 16, 2009.

Peace Poetry Festival is the brainchild of Ms Rira Abbasi, Iranian author and poet. The organization of the Festival is supported solely by the donations of individuals and sponsorships of non-governmental organizations and relies on no state subsidy. The charter of the festival states that: "Poetry for peace is affiliated to humanity, regardless of race, religion, sex and geography."

== See also ==
- Peace
- Peace and conflict studies
