= Prayer for Peace =

Prayer for Peace may refer to any prayer for peace, or more specifically:

== Religion ==
- Daily Prayer for Peace, a spiritual technique of the Community of Christ
- Day of Prayer for the Peace of Jerusalem, a Pentecostal prayer meeting
- Peace Prayer of St. Francis of Assisi, an anonymous prayer associated with the Italian saint

== Music ==
- Prayer for Peace (Billy Bang album), 2010
- Prayer for Peace (North Mississippi Allstars album), 2017
- A Prayer for Peace, a 2000 album by Arthur Doyle
- "Prayer for Peace", a 1958 song recorded by Perry Como

== See also ==
- The World Peace Prayer Society, a non-sectarian pacifist organization
- World Day of Prayer for Peace, an occasional gathering of world religious leaders
