= Salem, Fayette County, West Virginia =

- Unincorporated community
- Location within West Virginia Location within the United States
- Coordinates: 37°59′21″N 81°6′55″W
- Country: United States
- State: West Virginia
- County: Fayette
- Elevation: 2,142 ft (653 m)
- Time zone: UTC-5 (Eastern (EST))
  - Summer (DST): UTC-4 (EDT)
- GNIS ID: 1546279

Salem is an unincorporated community in Fayette County, West Virginia, United States. It was also known as New Salem or Oneal.
