= Heiwa-dōri =

Shopping location and tourist attraction in Okinawa, Japan

Coordinates: 26.2154°N 127.6886°E

Heiwa Dōri (平和通り, Peace Street) is a covered shopping arcade and tourist attraction in Naha, Okinawa. The entrance to the arcade is on Kokusai Street, opposite Mitsubishi department store. The name Heiwa Dōri was chosen in a public competition in 1951, and is linked to the Heiwa-kan cinema which used to be located in the mouth of the arcade.

In the early 2000s Heiwa Dōri had become dated, with few customers, and many empty shops. More recently though, the Naha Ichiba market association and a new generation of younger shop owners have worked to revitalise the arcade. An influx of bars and restaurants has created a dining and nightlife scene, while also causing some issues due to the number of inebriated patrons.

The street features many gift shops selling Okinawan products that range from stone Shisa dogs - traditional statues placed on the roofs of many Okinawan homes, Awamori, a traditional Okinawan alcohol, various foods, colored Ryukyu glassware, Kariyushi shirts (similar to Hawaiian shirts) and geta clogs.

The Heiwa Dōri arcade is open from 10am to 8:30pm every day.
