= Royal marriage =

Topics relevant to Royal marriage include:

- List of royal weddings
- Royal family
- Royal intermarriage
