= Yuzhong County =

Yuzhong County 榆中县
- County
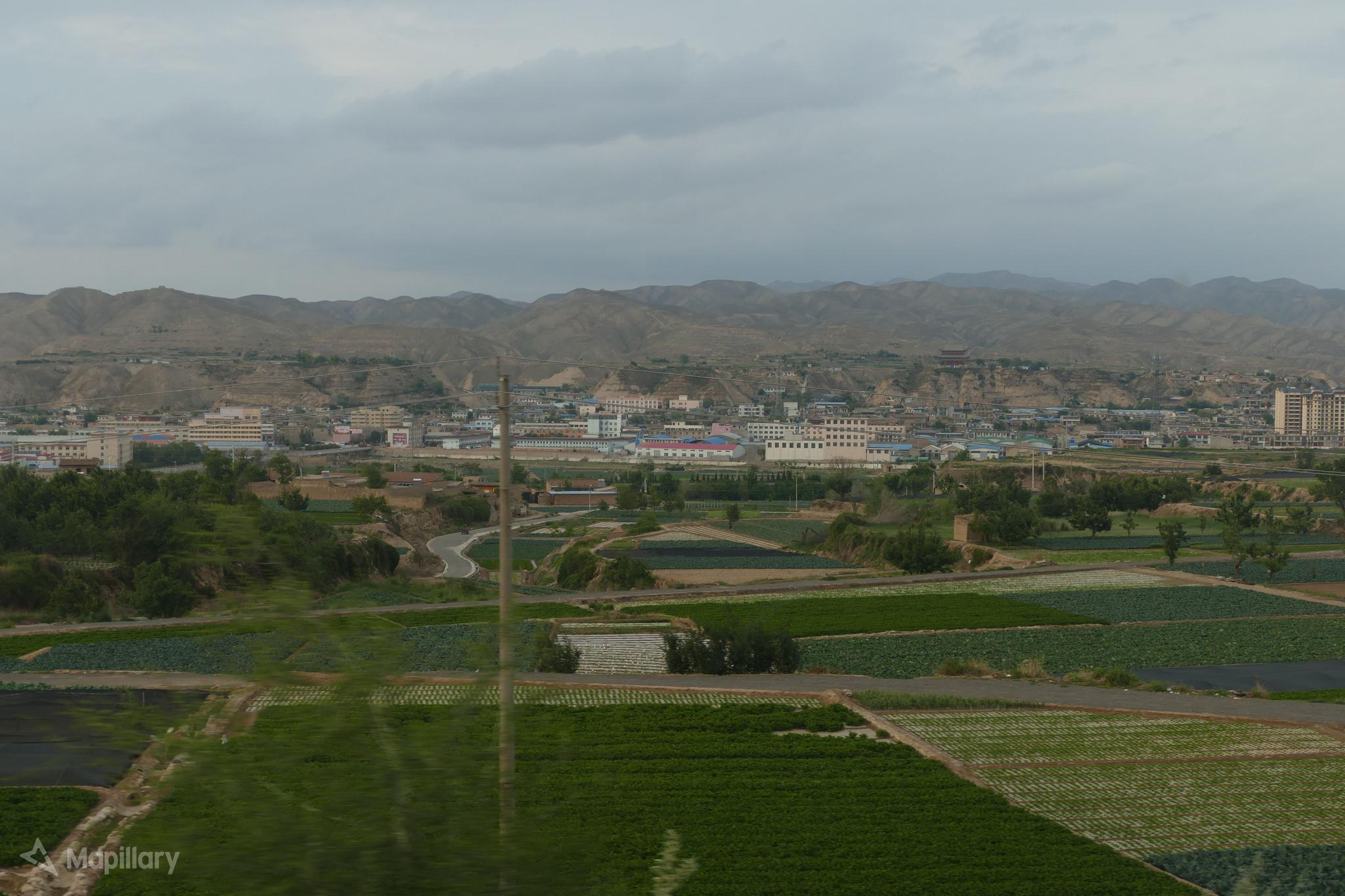
- Landscape near Jinya

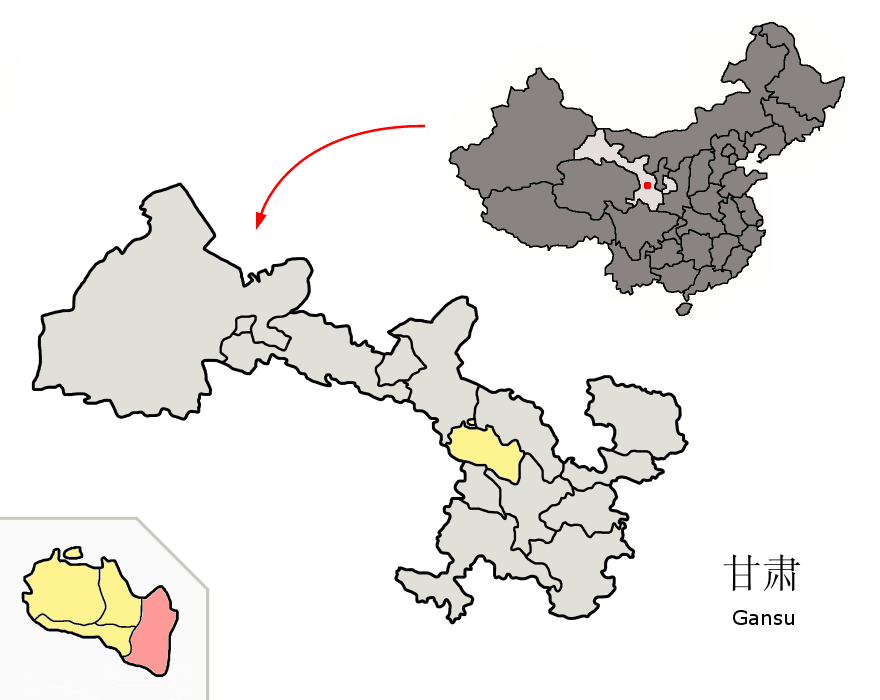
- Location of Yuzhong County (red) in Lanzhou City (yellow) and Gansu

- Location of the seat in Gansu
- Coordinates: 35°50′35″N 104°06′47″E
- Country: China
- Province: Gansu
- Prefecture-level city: Lanzhou
- County seat: Chengguan

Area
  - County: 3,301.64 km^{2} (1,274.77 sq mi)
- Highest elevation: 3,670 m (12,040 ft)
- Lowest elevation: 1,480 m (4,860 ft)

Population (2019)
  - County: 560,000
  - Density: 170/km^{2} (440/sq mi)
  - Urban: 103,900
- Time zone: UTC+8 (China Standard)
- Postal code: 730100
- Website: www.lzyuzhong.gov.cn

Yuzhong County (Chinese: 榆中县) is a county of Gansu Province, China, under the administration of the prefecture-level city of Lanzhou, the capital of Gansu, one of 58 counties of Gansu. Its postal code is 730100, and its population in 2019 was 560,000 people.

== History ==
The history of Yuzhong County goes back to 214 BC. During the Jin Dynasty Yuzhong was a center of the Jincheng district located in the Yuzhong county (xian) in the Gansu province. Up to 1917 it was known as Jin County or Jinxian. Yuzhong has always had importance as the eastern gateway to Lanzhou. The historic Mingsu tomb (zh:明肃王墓) is located in Yuzhong.

== Geography ==
The geography of Yuzhong is divided into the densely populated central valley of the Wanchuan River, flanked by forested mountains in the southwest, and arid mountains in the northeast.

== Climate ==
Climate data for Yuzhong, elevation 1,874 m (6,148 ft), (1991–2020 normals, extremes 1981–2010)
Month	Jan	Feb	Mar	Apr	May	Jun	Jul	Aug	Sep	Oct	Nov	Dec	Year
Record high °C (°F)	13.0 (55.4)	20.6 (69.1)	26.8 (80.2)	30.5 (86.9)	32.1 (89.8)	32.5 (90.5)	36.4 (97.5)	34.2 (93.6)	31.5 (88.7)	25.4 (77.7)	19.2 (66.6)	13.3 (55.9)	36.4 (97.5)
Mean daily maximum °C (°F)	0.5 (32.9)	4.8 (40.6)	10.6 (51.1)	17.1 (62.8)	21.0 (69.8)	24.5 (76.1)	26.4 (79.5)	25.2 (77.4)	20.1 (68.2)	14.4 (57.9)	8.1 (46.6)	2.1 (35.8)	14.6 (58.2)
Daily mean °C (°F)	−7.4 (18.7)	−3.0 (26.6)	3.2 (37.8)	9.5 (49.1)	13.8 (56.8)	17.5 (63.5)	19.5 (67.1)	18.5 (65.3)	13.7 (56.7)	7.5 (45.5)	0.5 (32.9)	−5.9 (21.4)	7.3 (45.1)
Mean daily minimum °C (°F)	−13.0 (8.6)	−8.5 (16.7)	−2.5 (27.5)	2.7 (36.9)	6.8 (44.2)	10.6 (51.1)	13.0 (55.4)	12.4 (54.3)	8.5 (47.3)	2.3 (36.1)	−4.7 (23.5)	−11.1 (12.0)	1.4 (34.5)
Record low °C (°F)	−24.7 (−12.5)	−22.4 (−8.3)	−17.8 (0.0)	−8.0 (17.6)	−3.4 (25.9)	0.6 (33.1)	4.8 (40.6)	3.4 (38.1)	−0.8 (30.6)	−10.5 (13.1)	−19.7 (−3.5)	−25.8 (−14.4)	−25.8 (−14.4)
Average precipitation mm (inches)	2.8 (0.11)	4.5 (0.18)	10.7 (0.42)	21.2 (0.83)	50.3 (1.98)	54.8 (2.16)	76.3 (3.00)	79.2 (3.12)	50.4 (1.98)	26.5 (1.04)	4.7 (0.19)	1.2 (0.05)	382.6 (15.06)
Average precipitation days (≥ 0.1 mm)	3.7	3.5	5.6	6.6	9.6	10.4	11.9	11.4	11.6	8.2	3.5	2.0	88
Average snowy days	6.7	6.0	6.1	2.5	0.2	0	0	0	0	1.9	4.4	4.2	32
Average relative humidity (%)	60	57	55	51	56	62	67	69	74	72	66	62	63
Mean monthly sunshine hours	185.4	189.8	213.0	229.0	248.6	240.5	247.3	232.3	178.0	187.1	192.5	199.8	2,543.3
Percentage possible sunshine	59	61	57	58	57	55	56	56	49	54	63	66	58
Source: China Meteorological Administration

== Demographics ==
Ethnic minorities form just 1% of the counties population, most of them are Hui.

== Administrative divisions ==
Yuzhong County is divided to 11 towns and 9 townships.

Towns

- Chengguan (城关镇)
- Xiaguanying (夏官营镇)
- Gaoya (高崖镇)
- Jinya (金崖镇)
- Heping (和平镇)
- Gancaodian (甘草店镇)
- Qingcheng (青城镇)
- Dingyuan (定远镇)
- Lianda (连搭镇)
- Xinying (新营镇)
- Gongjing (贡井镇)

Townships

- Xiaokangying Township (小康营乡)
- Mapo Township (马坡乡)
- Qingshuiyi Township (清水驿乡)
- Longquan Township (龙泉乡)
- Weiying Township (韦营乡)
- Zhonglianchuan Township (中连川乡)
- Yuanzicha Township (园子岔乡)
- Shanghuacha Township (上花岔乡)
- Haxian Township (哈岘乡)

It is proposed that Yuzhong will be upgraded to Yuzhong District.

== Economy ==
Until April 2019, it was a designated poverty stricken county, however due to its favorable location near Lanzhou, along important transportation axes, the county has rapidly developed industry and services sectors. In 2023 it was revealed that the county government spent 900 million CNY on a vanity project consisting of an exhibition hall and park, which remained unused for several years.

Jiuquan Iron & Steel has a major steel plant in Yuzhong producing 1.3 million tons of steel annually.

== Tourism ==
- Xinglongshan National Nature Reserve

== Transport ==
Highways

- G20 Qingdao–Yinchuan Expressway
- G30 Lianyungang–Khorgas Expressway
- G2501 Lanzhou Ring Expressway
- China National Highway 312
- China National Highway 309

Railways

- Baoji–Lanzhou high-speed railway (Yuzhong railway station)
- Longhai railway

The Chongqing–Lanzhou railway passes through Yuzhong county, but does not have any stations within the county. The Lanzhou Metro is proposed to be extended to Yuzhong.

== Education ==
=== Educational institutes ===
Several institutes of higher learning have (one of) their campuses in Yuzhong county.

Xiaguanying town

- Northwest Minzu University
- Lanzhou University (undergraduate campus)

Heping town

- Lanzhou Jiaotong University
- Lanzhou University of Finance and Economics
- Lanzhou Vocational College of Foreign Languages

== See also ==
- List of administrative divisions of Gansu
