= Xiaguanying, Lanzhou =

Xiaguanying 夏官营镇
- Town
- Location within Gansu Location within China
- Coordinates: 35.94267°N 104.17173°E
- Country: China
- Province: Gansu
- Prefecture-level city: Lanzhou
- County: Yuzhong

Area
  - Total: 136 km^{2} (53 sq mi)
- Elevation: 1,720 m (5,640 ft)

Population
  - Total: 12,000

Xiaguanying is a town of Yuzhong County, Lanzhou, China. It is designated as an expansion area of Lanzhou city and home to the Lanzhou Science and Education City which includes campuses of Lanzhou University and Northwest Minzu University.

Sanjiaocheng township was merged with Xiaguanying.

A rammed earth Qin dynasty fort is preserved in the town.

The Xiaguanying military airbase will be converted to a dual-use airport to serve as a secondary airport for Lanzhou in addition to Lanzhou Zhongchuan International Airport.
