= Heping, Yuzhong County =

Heping 和平镇
- Country: China
- Province: Gansu
- Prefecture-level city: Lanzhou
- County: Yuzhong

Population
  - Total: 30,000
  - Including migrants and students: 150,000
- Postal code: 730000

Heping is a town of Yuzhong County, Lanzhou, Gansu, China. It is informally known as Lanzhou's college town, with several college and university campuses located in the town.

== Educational institutes ==
- Lanzhou University of Finance and Economics
- Lanzhou Vocational College of Foreign Languages
- Lanzhou University of Finance and Economics Longqiao College
- Lanzhou Jiaotong University Bowen College
- Lanzhou Chenggong School
- Hengshui No. 1 Middle School Lanzhou Branch
