= Hungarian Revolution of 1956 =

Citizen rebellion in Hungary

- Part of the Cold War
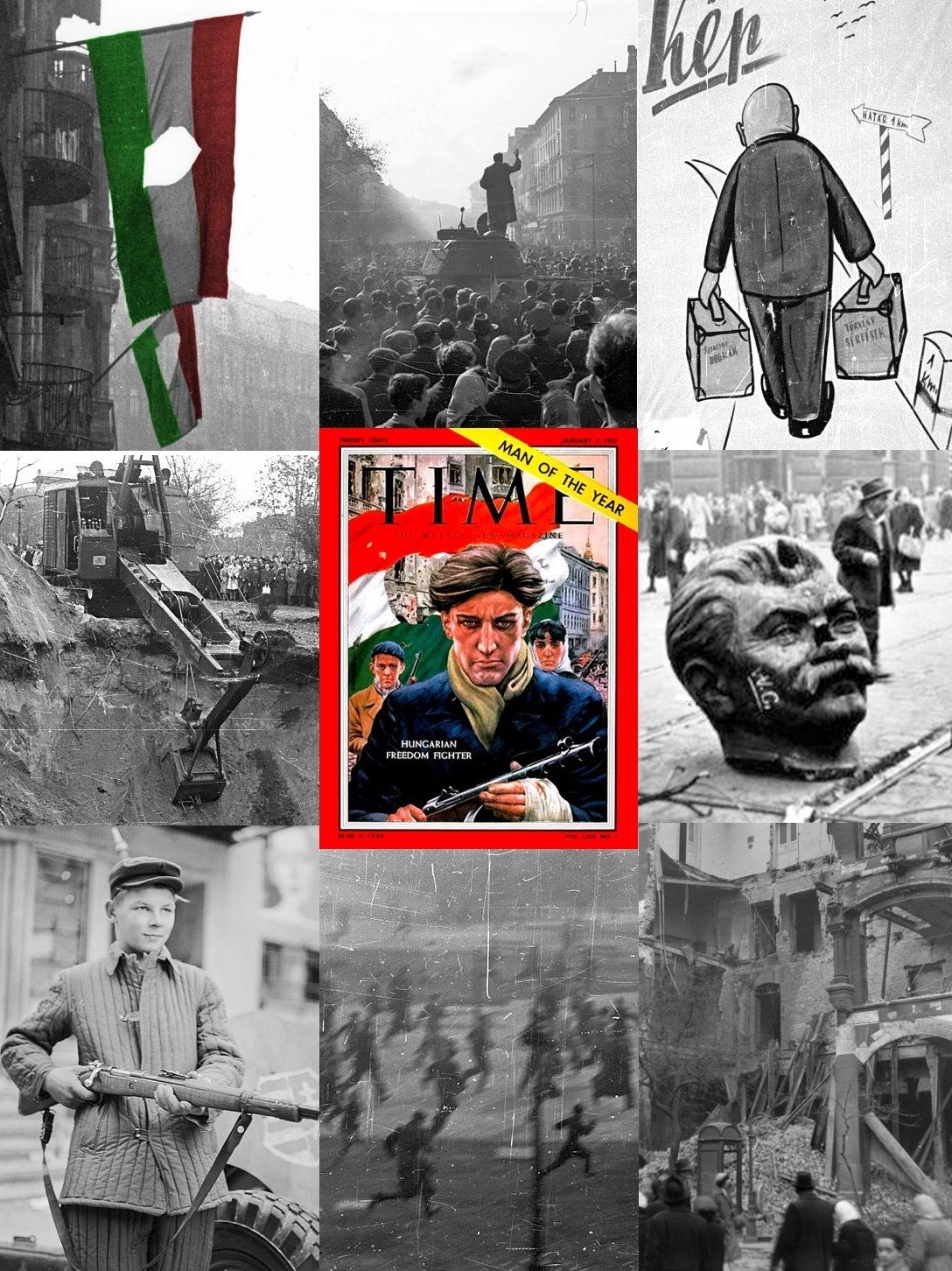
- From top to bottom, left to right: The rebels' flag · Speaker addresses to a crowd from an abandoned Soviet tank · Caricature of Mátyás Rákosi with suitcases going to the Soviet border · Search for Stalinist era mass graves and underground party bunkers · Hungarian Patriot, Time Man of the Year · Severed Stalin's head of a toppled monument · Young Hungarian rebel · Civilians flee from Soviet bombing · Ruins in Budapest after the Soviet bombings
Date	23 October – 11 November 1956 23 October – 3 November 1956 (main phase) 4–11 November 1956 (suppression)
Location	Hungary
Result	Soviet victory

Belligerents
Soviet Union; Until 24 October: Hungary (Hegedüs government); From 4 November: Kádár government	Hungarian revolutionaries; From 24 October: Hungary (Nagy government)

Commanders and leaders
Nikita Khrushchev; Yuri Andropov; Ivan Konev; Ivan Serov; Georgy Zhukov; Kuzma Grebennik; Gennady Obaturov; Vasily Sokolovsky; Ernő Gerő; András Hegedüs; László Piros; István Bata; János Kádár; Ferenc Münnich; Antal Apró	Imre Nagy (executed); Pál Maléter (executed); Géza Losonczy; Zoltán Tildy; Béla Kovács; Anna Kéthly; Miklós Gimes (executed); József Dudás (executed); Sándor Kopácsi (POW); Béla Király; Gergely Pongrátz

Units involved
Soviet Armed Forces; KGB; ÁVH; Loyalist elements of the MN	Armed citizens; Demonstrators; Pro-Revolution elements of the MN

Strength
31,550 troops; 1,130 tanks (Note: The UN General Assembly Special Committee on the Problem of Hungary (1957) estimated 75,000–200,000 soldiers and 1,600–4,000 tanks OSZK.hu (p. 56). Soviet archives (available in Lib.ru, Maksim Moshkow's Library) list 31,550 soldiers, 1,130 tanks, and self-propelled artillery pieces. Lib.ru Archived 9 February 2010 at the Wayback Machine (in Russian).)	Unknown

Political support
Working People's Party (loyalists, to 28 October); Socialist Workers' Party (from 4 November)	Working People's Party (dissidents, to 31 October); Socialist Workers' Party; (to 4 November); Smallholders' Party; Social Democratic Party; Petőfi Party; Democratic People's Party; Independence Party; Other reformed parties

Casualties and losses
722 killed; 1,540 wounded	2,000–3,000 killed; 13,000 wounded; 200,000 exiled

The Hungarian Revolution of 1956 (23 October – 4 November 1956; Hungarian: 1956-os forradalom), also known as the Hungarian Uprising, was an attempted countrywide revolution against the government of the Hungarian People's Republic (1949–1989) and the policies caused by the government's subordination to the Union of Soviet Socialist Republics (USSR). (Note: Alternate names for the revolution are Hungarian Uprising and Hungarian Revolt; the first term used the word felkelés ("uprising"); in the Communist period of 1957–1988, the term used was Ellenforradalom (Counter-revolution); and, since 1990, the official term for the Hungarian Revolution is the phrase: Forradalom és szabadságharc (Revolution and the Fight for Freedom), which evokes the Hungarian Revolution of 1848. Linguistically, whereas the English revolution corresponds to the Hungarian forradalom (U.S. State Dept. background on Hungary), the Oxford English Dictionary distinguishes between a revolution, which deposes a government, and an armed revolt, which might fail or succeed.) The uprising lasted 15 days before being crushed by Soviet troops on 7 November 1956 (outside of Budapest, firefights lasted until at least 12 November 1956). Thousands were killed or wounded, and nearly a quarter of a million Hungarians fled the country.

The Hungarian Revolution began on 23 October 1956 in Budapest when university students appealed to the civil populace to join them at the Hungarian Parliament Building to protest the USSR's geopolitical domination of Hungary through the communist government of Mátyás Rákosi. A delegation of students entered the building of Magyar Rádió to broadcast their sixteen demands for political and economic reforms to civil society, but were detained by security guards. When the student protesters outside the radio building demanded the release of their delegation, a group of police from the ÁVH (State Protection Authority) fatally shot several of the students. The siege of the Radio building began shortly after midnight and ended around 8 a.m. At that point, the revolutionaries broke into the building and treated the soldiers, officer cadets, and members of the ÁVH (State Protection Authority) found there as prisoners. ÁVH officer Major Fehér was executed with a shot to the back of the head.

Consequently, Hungarians organized into revolutionary militias to fight the ÁVH; local Hungarian communist leaders and ÁVH policemen were captured and summarily executed, and political prisoners were released and armed. To realize their political, economic, and social demands, local soviets (councils of workers) assumed control of municipal government from the Hungarian Working People's Party (Magyar Dolgozók Pártja). The new government of Imre Nagy disbanded the ÁVH (on 28 October), declared Hungary's withdrawal from the Warsaw Pact (on 1 November), and pledged to reestablish free elections. By the end of October, the intense fighting had subsided.

Although initially showing willingness to negotiate the withdrawal of the Soviet Army from Hungary (having negotiations on 3 November), the USSR repressed the Hungarian Revolution on 4 November, and fought the Hungarian revolutionaries until Soviet victory on 10 November; repression of the Hungarian Uprising killed 2,000 Hungarians and 700 Soviet Army soldiers, and compelled 200,000 Hungarians to seek political refuge abroad, mostly in Austria.

== Background ==
=== Second World War ===
During World War II, the Kingdom of Hungary was a member of the Axis powers in alliance with Nazi Germany, Fascist Italy, the Kingdom of Romania, and the Kingdom of Bulgaria. In 1941, the Royal Hungarian Army participated in the Nazi invasion of Yugoslavia (6 April 1941) and in Operation Barbarossa (22 June 1941), the invasion of the USSR. By 1944, the Red Army was on the way to the Kingdom of Hungary, after first having repelled the Royal Hungarian Army and the armies of the other Axis Powers from the territory of the USSR.

Fearful of the Red Army's occupation of the Kingdom of Hungary, the royal Hungarian government unsuccessfully sought an armistice with the Allies, which was a betrayal of the Axis powers. The Germans launched Operation Margarethe (12 March 1944) to establish the Nazi Government of National Unity of Hungary; the short-lived puppet government existed for less than a year and Hungary was occupied by the Soviet Union in 1945 after the Siege of Budapest.

=== Soviet occupation ===
At the end of the war, the Kingdom of Hungary was in the geopolitical sphere of influence of the USSR. In the political aftermath of the War, Hungary was a multi-party democracy, in which the 1945 Hungarian parliamentary election produced a coalition government composed of Independent Smallholders, Agrarian Workers and the Civic Party, headed by President Zoltán Tildy and Prime Minister Ferenc Nagy. Nonetheless, on behalf of the USSR, the Hungarian Communist Party continually used salami slicing tactics to wrest minor political concessions, which continually diminished the political authority of the coalition government, despite the Communist Party having received only 17 percent of the votes in the parliamentary election of 1945.

After the election in 1945, control of the State Protection Authority (Államvédelmi Hatóság, ÁVH) was transferred from the Independent Smallholders Party of the coalition government to the Hungarian Communist party. The ÁVH repressed non‑communist political opponents with intimidation, false accusations, imprisonment, and torture. The four years of multi-party democracy ended when the Social Democratic Party of Hungary merged with the Communist Party and became the Hungarian Working People's Party, whose candidate stood unopposed in the 1949 Hungarian parliamentary election. Afterward, on 20 August 1949, the Hungarian People's Republic was proclaimed and established as a socialist state, with which the USSR then concluded the COMECON treaty of mutual assistance, which allowed stationing troops of Red Army soldiers in Hungary.

Based upon the economic model of the USSR, the Hungarian Working People's Party established the socialist economy of Hungary with the nationalization of the means of production and of the natural resources of the country. Moreover, by 1955, the relatively free politics of Hungary allowed intellectuals and journalists to freely criticize the Rákosi government's social and economic policies. In that vein of relative political freedom, on 22 October 1956, students from the Budapest University of Technology and Economics had reestablished the MEFESZ students' union, which the Rákosi government had banned for its politically incorrect politics.

=== Stalinist Hungary ===
Initially, the Hungarian People's Republic was a socialist state headed by the Communist government of Mátyás Rákosi (r. 1947–1956), a Stalinist beholden to the USSR. To ensure ideological compliance within his Stalinist government, Rákosi used the ÁVH to purge 7,000 politically dissident Titoists and Trotskyists from the Communist Party of Hungary for being "Western agents" whose participation in the Spanish Civil War interfered with Stalin's long-term plans for world communism. Among the Stalinist governments of the Eastern Bloc, the Rákosi government of the Hungarian People's Republic was most repressive of political, sexual, and religious minorities.

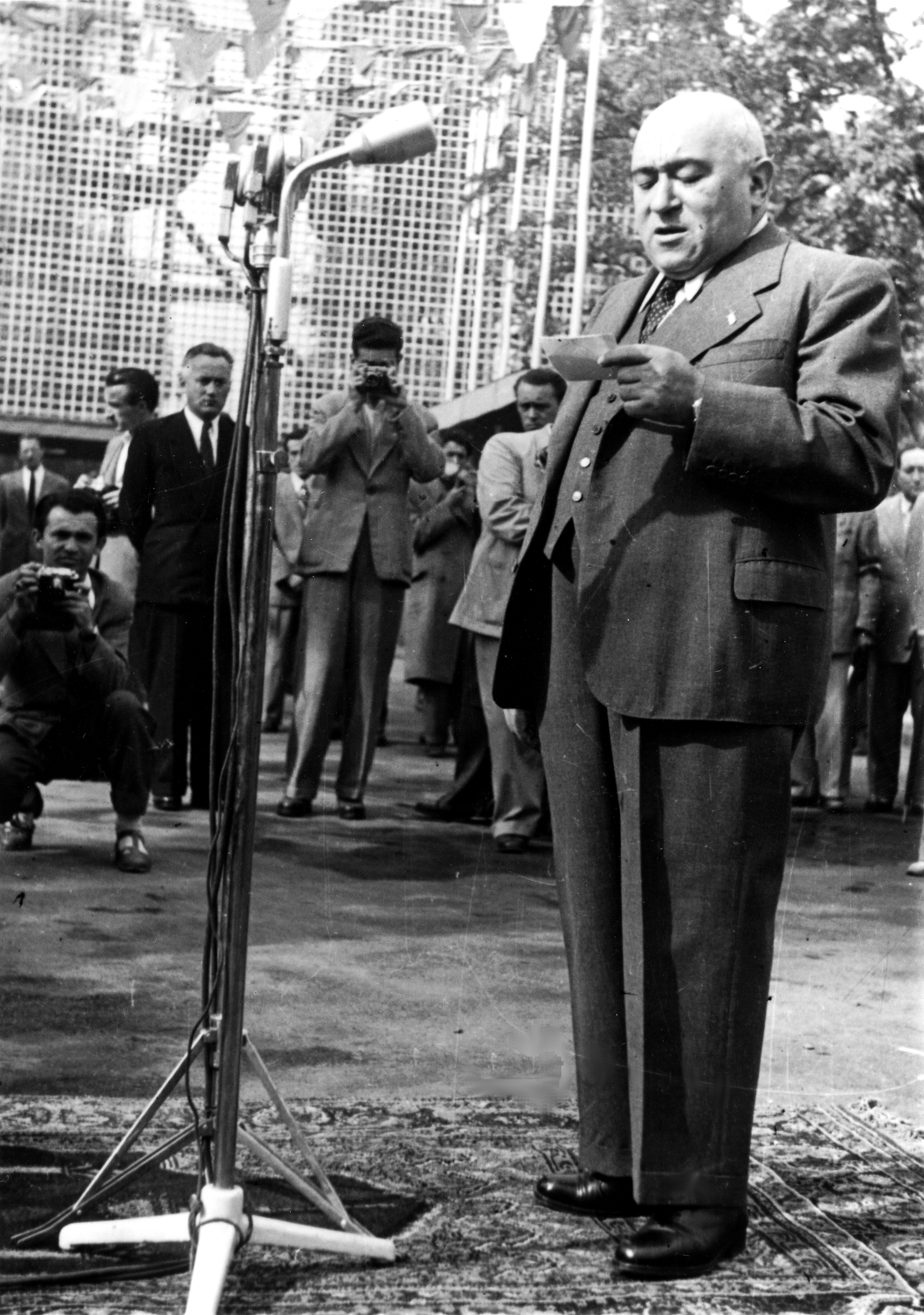
Mátyás Rákosi addresses an audience in Budapest, 1948.

In 1949, the Rákosi government arrested, tortured, and convicted Cardinal József Mindszenty in a show trial for treason against Hungary, for collaboration with Nazi Germany and Fascist Italy in the Holocaust in Hungary—religious persecution of Hungarian Jews and political persecution of Hungarian communists and anti-Nazis. In fact, Mindszenty had been an active opponent of the Nazi government, encouraged Hungarian Catholics not to vote for the Arrow Cross Party, and was imprisoned for this dissent by the Arrow Cross-led Government of National Unity.

==== Political repression ====
In 1950–1952, the ÁVH forcibly relocated more than 26,000 non-communist Hungarians and confiscated their housing for members of the Communist Party of Hungary, thus eliminating political threats posed by the nationalist and anti-communist intelligentsia and local bourgeoisie. According to their particular politics, anti-communist Hungarians were either imprisoned in concentration camps, deported to the USSR, or killed, either summarily or after a show trial; the victims included the communist politician László Rajk, the minister of the interior who established the ÁVH secret police.

The Rákosi government politicized the education system with a "toiling intelligentsia" who assisted in Hungary's Russification; thus the study of Russian language and communist political instruction were mandatory at school and at university; religious schools were nationalized, and church leaders replaced by communist officials.

==== Economic decline ====
In the early 1950s, the Rákosi government's socialist economics increased the per capita income of the Hungarian people, yet their standard of living diminished because of the compulsory financial contributions toward the industrialization of Hungary, which reduced workers' disposable income. The economic hardships that resulted were further exacerbated by bureaucratic mismanagement of resources, which resulted in shortages, and the subsequent rationing of food. Hungarian workers' disposable income in 1952 was two-thirds of that in 1938.

Besides paying for the Red Army occupation of socialist Hungary, the Hungarians also paid war reparations (US$300 million) to the USSR, the Czechoslovak Socialist Republic, and the Socialist Federal Republic of Yugoslavia. In 1946, the Hungarian National Bank reported that the cost of war reparations was "between 19 and 22 percentile of the annual national income" of Hungary, an onerous national expense aggravated by the hyperinflation consequent to the postwar depreciation of the Hungarian pengő. Moreover, participation in the Soviet-sponsored Council of Mutual Economic Assistance (Comecon) prevented direct trade with the countries of the West, and also prevented the Hungarian People's Republic from receiving American financial aid through the Marshall Plan (1948). Socially, the imposition of Soviet-style economic policies and the payment of war reparations angered the peoples of Hungary, while the cumulative effects of economic austerity fueled anti-Soviet political discontent as the payment of foreign debt took precedence over the material needs of the Hungarian people.

=== International events ===
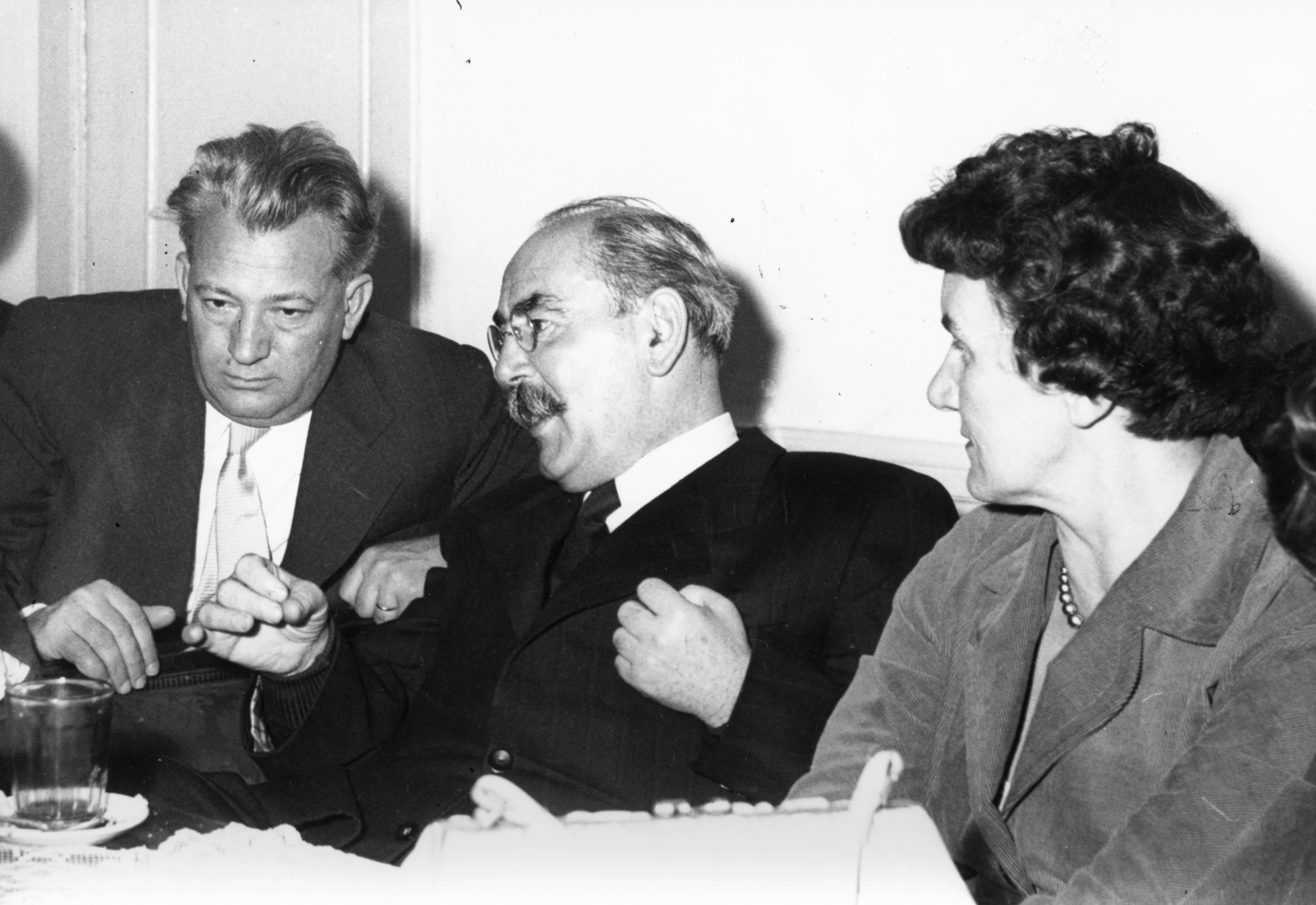
In the Eastern bloc, Hungarian Prime Minister Imre Nagy (centre) proved too progressive a Communist in his government's pursuit of the Hungarian road to Socialism, taking it too far out of the Soviet Union's orbit (October 1956).

==== De–Stalinization ====
On 5 March 1953, the death of Stalin allowed the Communist Party of the Soviet Union (CPSU) to proceed with the de-Stalinization of the USSR, a relative liberalization of politics that subsequently allowed most European communist parties and the communist parties of the Warsaw Pact to develop a reformist wing—within the structures of the philosophy of Marxism and orders from Moscow. Hence, the reformist communist Imre Nagy became prime minister (1953–55) of the Hungarian People's Republic, replacing the Stalinist Rákosi (1952–53), whose heavy-handed style of communist government had proved counterproductive to the USSR's interests in Hungary.

Despite not being prime minister, Rákosi remained politically powerful as the General Secretary of the Hungarian Communist Party, and so undermined many of the Nagy government's political and socioeconomic reforms; by 18 April 1955, he had so discredited Nagy that the USSR deposed Nagy as Socialist Hungary's head of state. Three months of plotting and conspiring rid Rákosi and the Hungarian Communist Party of Nagy, who was reduced to a political non-person. On 14 April Nagy was stripped of his Hungarian Communist Party offices and functions. On 18 April he was sacked as prime minister. Despite having been out of political favour with the USSR since January 1955, Nagy had refused to perform the requisite communist penance of self-criticism and refused to resign.

In February 1956, as First Secretary of the CPSU Nikita Khrushchev initiated the de-Stalinization of the USSR with the speech On the Personality Cult and its Consequences, which catalogued and denounced the abuses of power Stalin and his inner-circle protégés committed, in Russia and abroad. Therefore, the de-Stalinization of Hungarian People's Republic featured Rákosi's dismissal as General Secretary of the Communist Party of Hungary, and his replacement by Ernő Gerő, on 18 July 1956.

The countries of western Europe cooperated with the CIA's propaganda radio network, Radio Free Europe, to broadcast Khrushchev's speech to the countries of eastern Europe, expecting that it would destabilize the Warsaw Pact countries' internal politics.

==== The establishing of the Warsaw Pact ====
On 14 May 1955, with the Treaty of Friendship, Cooperation and Mutual Assistance, the USSR established the Warsaw Pact with seven countries of the Eastern Bloc, including the Hungarian People's Republic. The geopolitical principles of the Warsaw Pact defence treaty included "respect for the independence and [the] sovereignty of [the member] states" and the practice of "non-interference in their internal affairs". Then, on 15 May 1955, a day after the USSR established the Warsaw Pact, the Austrian State Treaty established Austria as a neutral country in the geopolitical cold war between the US and the USSR. Austria's declaration of geopolitical neutrality allowed Nagy's government to publicly consider "the possibility of Hungary adopting a neutral status on the Austrian pattern".

In June 1956, the Polish Army violently repressed the workers' uprising at Poznań against the economic policies of the Polish People's Republic. In October, the Polish government appointed the politically rehabilitated, reform communist Władysław Gomułka as First Secretary of the Polish United Workers' Party to deal with the USSR, and, by 19 October 1956, Gomułka had negotiated greater trade agreements and fewer Red Army troops stationed in Poland. The USSR's concessions to Poland—known as the Polish October—emboldened Hungarians to demand from the USSR like concessions for the Hungarian People's Republic, which contributed to Hungarians' greatly idealistic politics in October 1956.

== Uprising and Revolution ==
=== Political discontent ===
On 13 October 1956, a group of 12 students from the university faculties in Szeged met to play cards, and snubbed the DISZ, the official communist student union, by reestablishing the MEFESZ (Union of Hungarian University and Academy Students), the democratic student union banned by the Stalinist Rákosi government. The MEFESZ students distributed handwritten notes in classrooms to inform faculty and students of the time and place for the meeting on 16 October 1956. A professor of law was chairman of committee who formally reestablished the MEFESZ student union, with the proclamation and publication of a twenty-demand manifesto, ten about the MEFESZ, and ten anti-Soviet demands, e.g. free elections and the departure of Soviet troops from Hungary; days later, university students at Pécs, Miskolc, and Sopron followed suit.

On 22 October, at the Budapest University of Technology and Economics, one of the law students from the original group of twelve students, announced that the MEFESZ student union was again politically active, and then proclaimed the Sixteen Political, Economic, and Ideological Points against the USSR's geopolitical hegemony. On 23 October the Hungarian Writers' Union ceremoniously proclaimed Hungary's anti-Soviet political solidarity with anti-communist reformers in Poland when they laid a commemorative wreath at the statue of the Polish hero Józef Zachariasz Bem, who also was a hero of the Hungarian Revolution of 1848; the MEFESZ student union held a parallel demonstration of Hungarians' political solidarity with the Poles.

=== Initiating gunfire ===
The peaceful demonstration of students started at about 2 pm at the Petőfi square. An actor, Imre Sinkovits, recited the National song (a poem by Sándor Petőfi), then a university student read out the 16 demands of the protesters.

In the afternoon of 23 October 1956, approximately 20,000 protestors met beside the statue of Bem. To the amassed crowd of protesters, the intellectual Péter Veres, president of the Writers' Union (Írószövetség), read a manifesto demanding Hungarian independence from all foreign powers; a democratic socialist political system based upon land reform and (public) state ownership in the economy; Hungarian membership to the United Nations; and all freedoms and rights for the citizens of Hungary. After Veres proclaimed the manifesto demanding Hungarian sovereignty, the crowd chanted the Hungarian patriotic poem National Song (Nemzeti dal), which the Rákosi government had banned from public performance; the crowd repeatedly chanted the refrain: "This we swear, this we swear, that we will no longer be slaves."

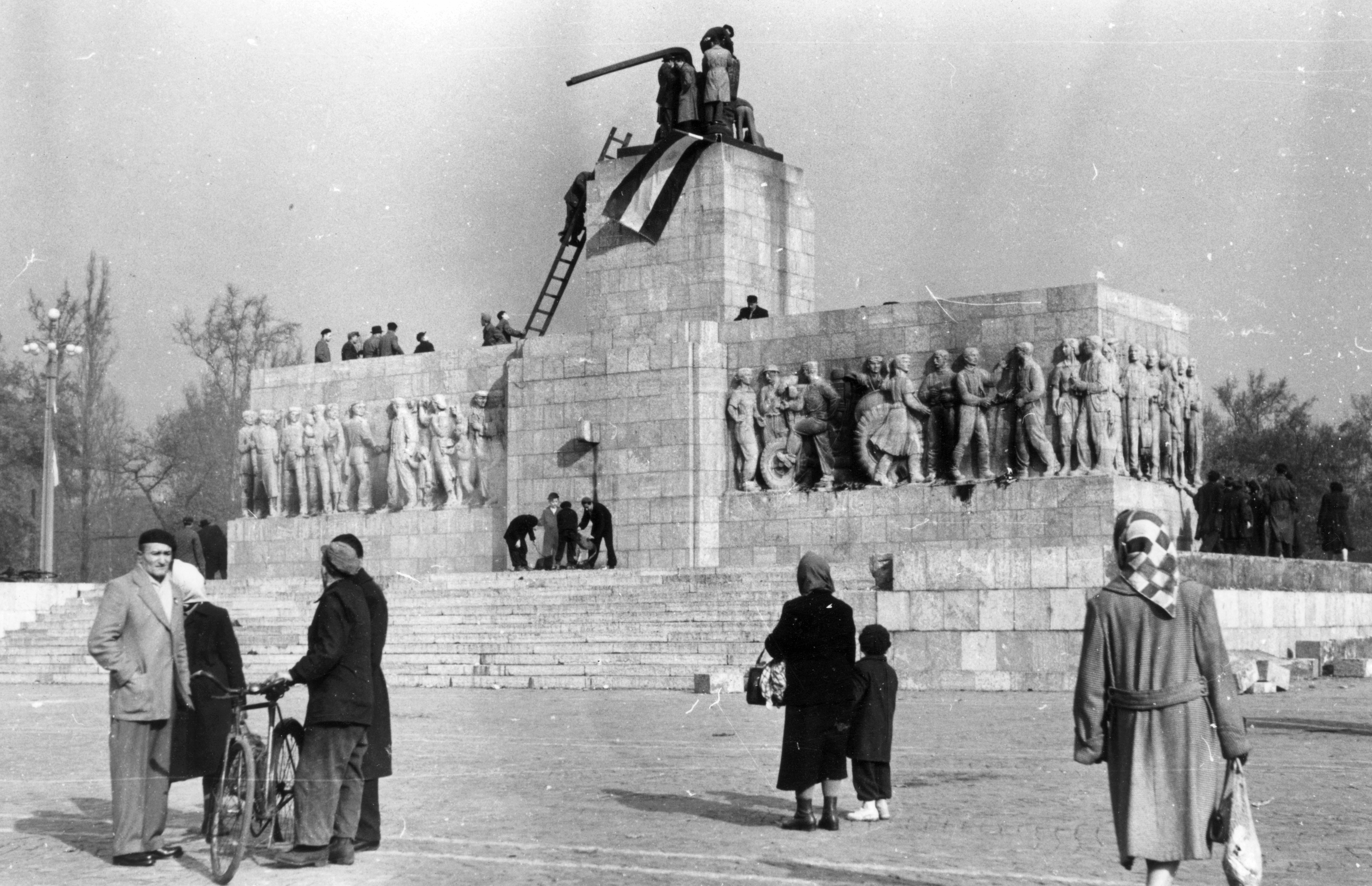
In Budapest, anti-communists and nationalists place a Hungarian national flag atop a demolished statue of Joseph Stalin.

At 20:00, the first secretary of the Hungarian Working People's Party, Ernő Gerő, broadcast a hardline speech condemning the political demands of the intelligentsia and of the university students. Angered by Gerő's rejection, some protesters realized one of their demands, demolishing the Stalin Monument in Budapest, which had been erected in place of a razed church in 1951; and by 21:30 the nationalist and anti-communist protesters had destroyed the eight-metre-tall statue of Stalin.

Also at 20:00, a crowd of nationalist and anti-communist protesters had gathered outside the Magyar Rádió building, which was guarded by the ÁVH secret police. Violence soon occurred between the sides when the protesters heard rumors of the arrest and detainment of a delegation of students who had entered the radio station in effort to broadcast their demands to the country. The situation escalated after protesters heard that the ÁVH had killed their delegation of comrades sent to broadcast the anti–Soviet message. In response, from the windows of the building, the ÁVH threw tear gas grenades at and fired upon the anti-communist and nationalist protesters assembled outside the Magyar Rádió building, and soon required resupply and reinforcement.

In suppressing the Hungarians' anti-government protestations, the ÁVH smuggled weapons and ammunition in an ambulance for delivery to them at the Magyar Rádió building, but the protesters hijacked the ambulance and the weapons for themselves. The Hungarian Army sent soldiers to support the ÁVH policemen defending the building, but some tore off the red-star insignia on their caps and joined the protesters. ÁVH policemen used guns and tear gas, while the protesters set police cars afire, distributed weapons captured from the military and police forces, and destroyed the symbols of Russian communism in Hungary.

=== Deposing the communist government ===
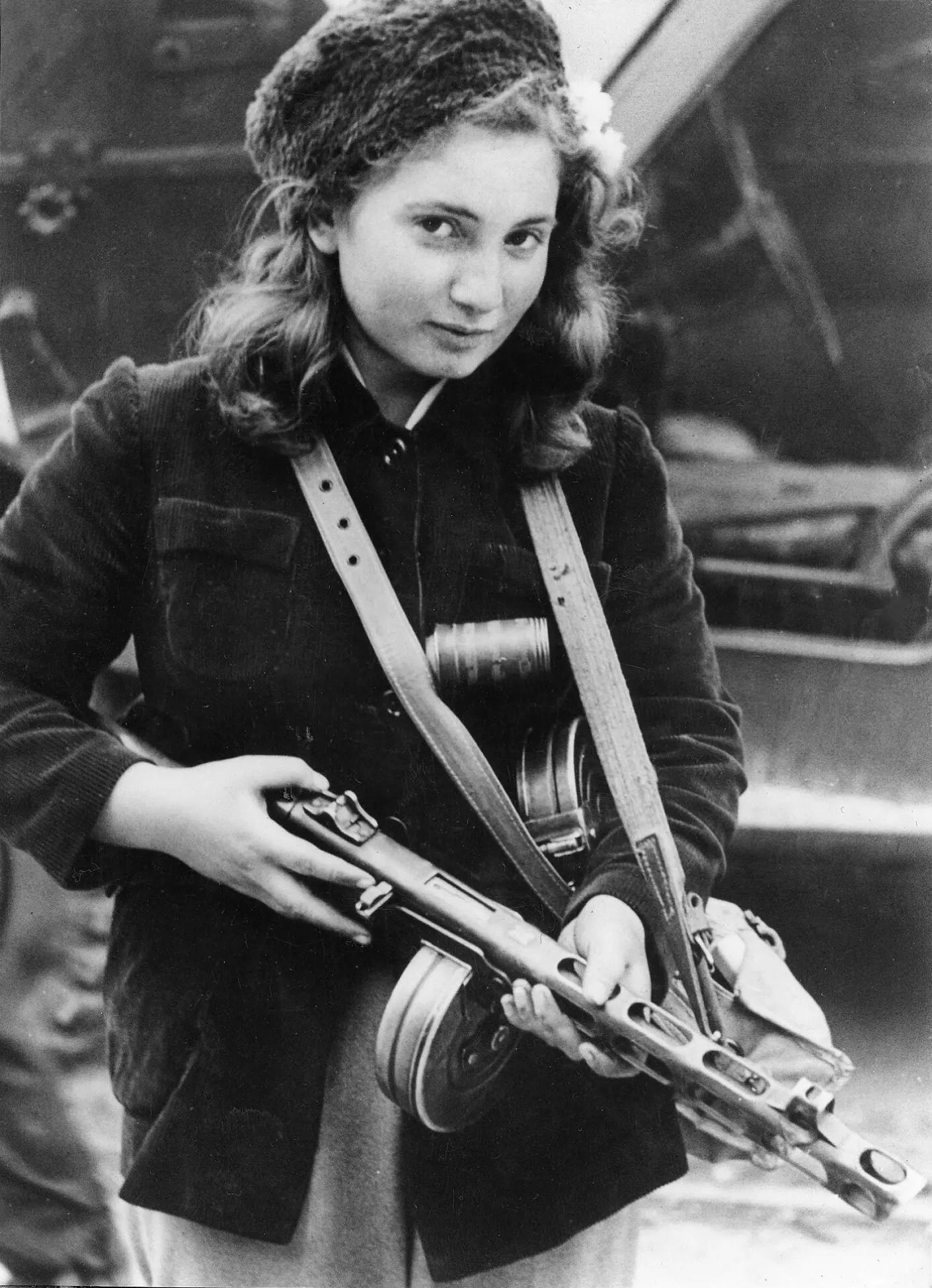
Photo by Anders Engman

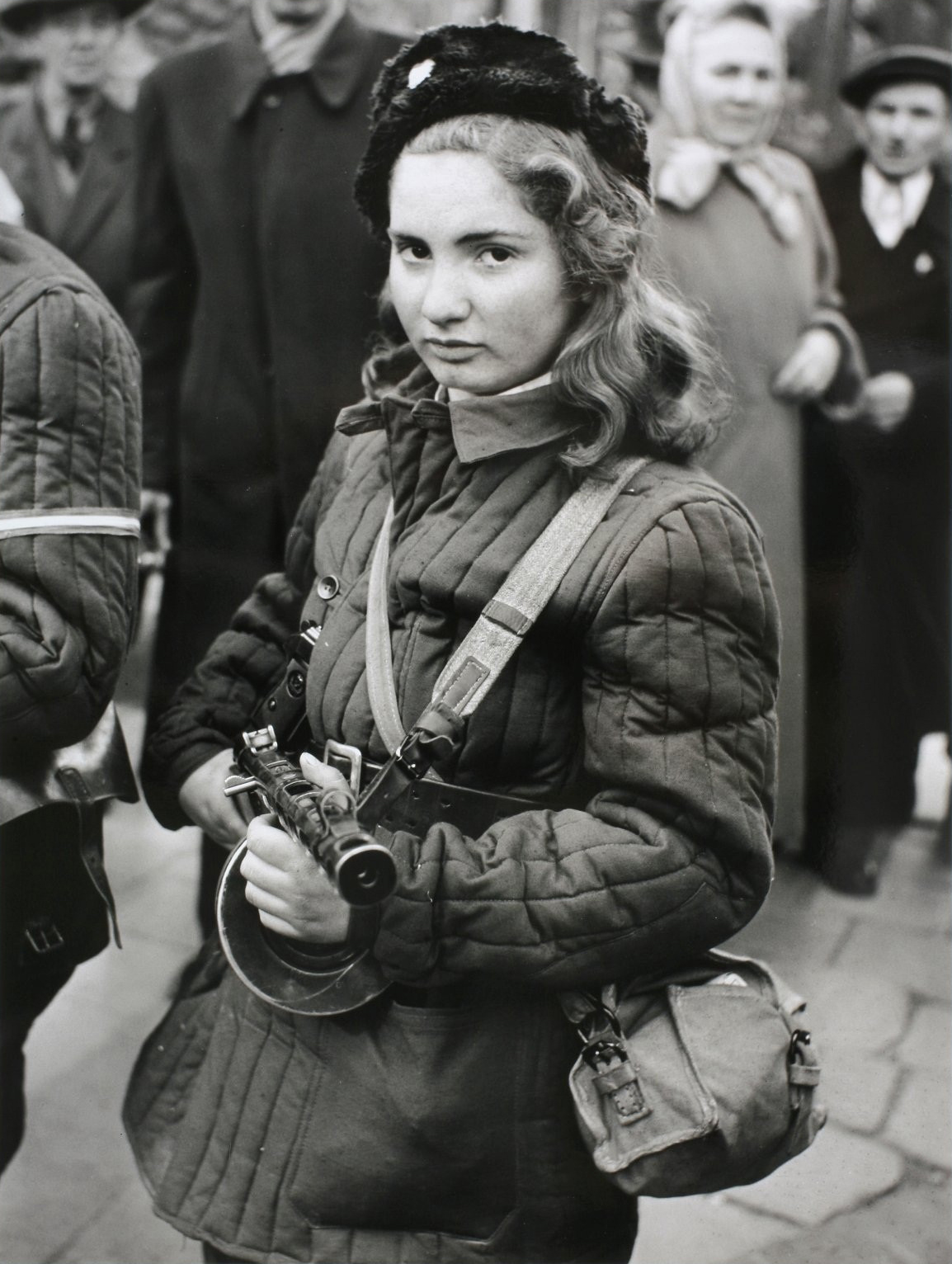
Photo by Vagn Hansen

Erika Szeles, a 15-year-old martyr of the revolution. Her photograph, used as a cover image, spread across Western countries during the October Revolution and grew into a true symbol: "a symbol of courage and hope"

On 23 October, Gerő asked for the USSR's military intervention in order "to suppress a demonstration that was reaching an ever-greater and unprecedented scale", which threatens the national security of the Hungarian People's Republic. To that end, the USSR already had planned the invasion and occupation of Hungary, and the political purging of Hungarian society. At 02:00 on 24 October 1956, Soviet defence minister Georgy Zhukov ordered the Red Army to occupy Budapest – the capital city of a Warsaw Pact country.

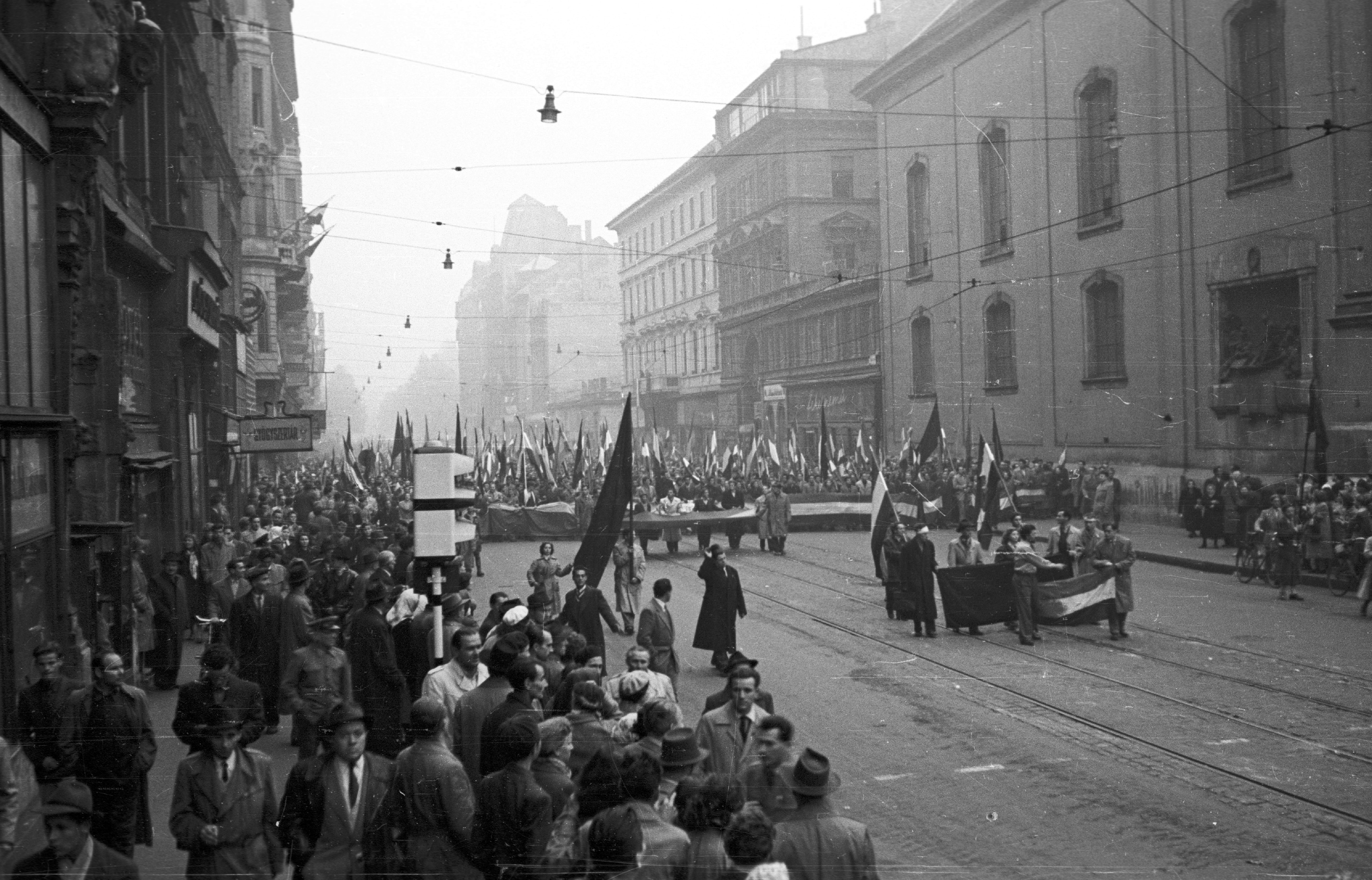
Kossuth Lajos Street seen from Ferenciek Square: anti-Soviet demonstrators march in protest against the USSR's control of Hungary, 25 October 1956.

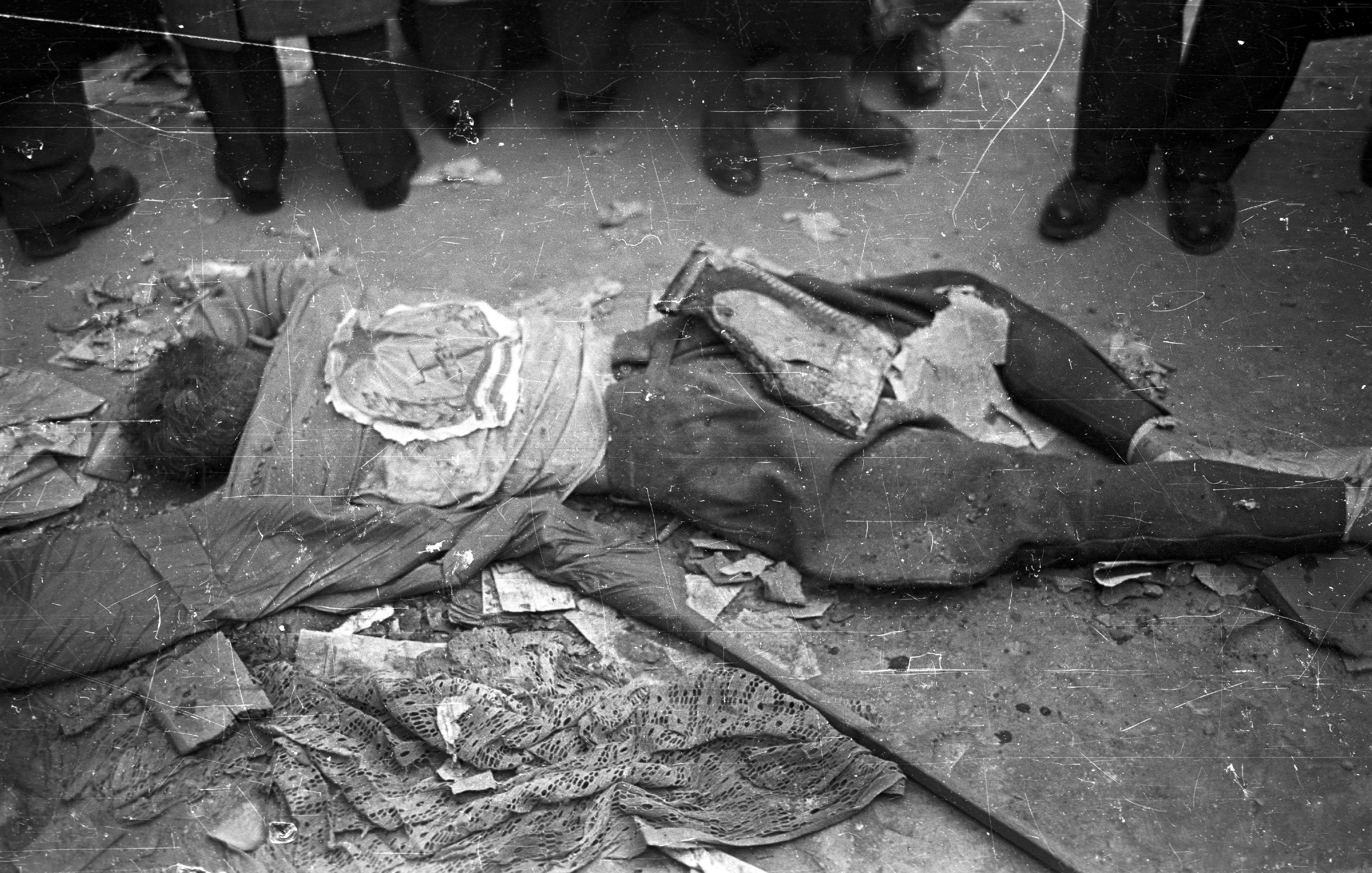
The corpse of a communist officer killed defending the headquarters of the Hungarian Communist Party, Republic Square, Budapest.

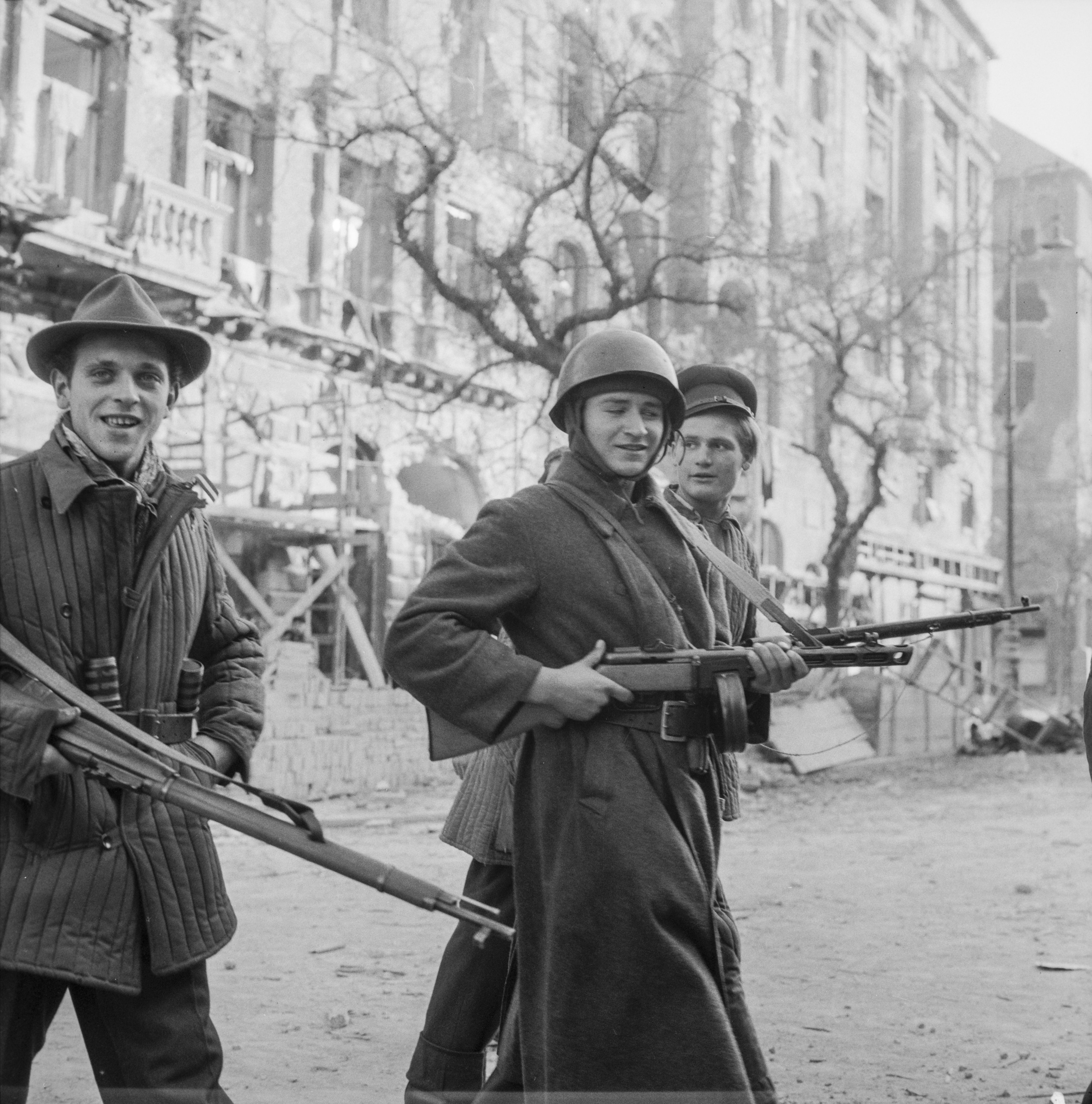
Anti-communist Hungarian revolutionaries amid the damaged buildings of Budapest, November 1956.

By 12:00 on 24 October, Red Army tanks were stationed outside the parliament building, and Red Army soldiers held the bridges and crossroads that controlled access to Budapest, while Hungarian revolutionaries barricaded streets to defend their city from the Red Army. Also on that day, Imre Nagy became prime minister in place of András Hegedüs. In a national radio broadcast, Nagy asked a ceasefire between the Red Army and the Hungarian Revolutionaries, and agreed to initiate postponed political reforms decided in 1953. Despite the pleas of Nagy, groups of revolutionaries in Budapest armed themselves and continually fought the Red Army.

At around 3 p.m. on October 24, there were still approximately four thousand armed demonstrators at the Radio building. They demanded the removal of Ernő Gerő. A. Mikoyan and M. Suslov communicated this fact to the party leadership in Moscow in a telegram.

At the offices of the communist newspaper Szabad Nép, the ÁVH guards fired upon unarmed protestors; in turn, anti-communists attacked and drove out the ÁVH policemen from the newspaper building. The Hungarian revolutionaries then avenged themselves against the ÁVH policemen. On 25 October, a crowd gathered in Kossuth Square in front of the Hungarian Parliament Building, which was a mixed group of civilian demonstrators including women, children, and elderly. Most of them came from the mass demonstration outside the Astoria, accompanied by three Soviet tanks, which the demonstrators climbed on, fraternising with the crews. At the same time a column of Soviet tanks carrying two delegates of the Communist Party of the Soviet Union (CPSU) sent to Hungary, Politburo members Anastas Mikoyan and Mikhail Suslov, as well as KGB Chairman Ivan Serov and Mikhail Malinin, commander-in-chief of the Soviet forces in Hungary were on their way to the headquarters of the Hungarian Workers' Party (MDP) on Akadémia Street, where they were to attend a meeting of the Central Executive Committee (CEC), which was to begin at 10:00. Under pressure from the Soviet delegates, the CEC relieved Ernő Gerő of his position as party leader and elected János Kádár in his place. Meanwhile, the crowd demonstrating at Kossuth Square elected a delegation to deliver their demands in the Parliament, but government guards and a company of the Ministry of Defence's armoured regiment, backed by seven Soviet T-54 tanks lined up in front of the Parliament, kept the demonstrators away from the building. The events at Astoria were repeated, with demonstrators trying to make friends with the Soviet soldiers, handing out bilingual leaflets and some climbing on top of the guard tanks. At a few minutes after 11:00, General Serov decided to inspect the situation on Kossuth Square, accompanied by several Soviet and Hungarian officers and a tank. Seeing several Soviet soldiers fraternising with the demonstrators, Serov ordered the firing of warning shots, which caused a mass panic on the square. In the ensuing confusion, the Soviet tanks lined up in front of the Parliament building responded by targeting the buildings on the other side of the square. Another Soviet tank coming from a nearby street fired aimed shots at the demonstrators trying to take cover. This action claimed the most lives. The number of the dead is still disputed, with estimates ranging from 75 to 1000.

According to another version of the events, which already appeared during the revolution but still unproven, the ÁVH policemen and/or communist partisans fired into the assembled protestors from the roof of the building of the Agricultural Ministry. In the fog of war, some Red Army soldiers mistakenly returned the fire towards the roof, having mistakenly believed themselves the targets. The Hungarian revolutionaries armed themselves with weapons captured from ÁVH policemen and with weapons donated by anti-communist soldiers who had deserted the Hungarian People's Army for the Hungarian Revolution against the USSR; from amongst the crowd outside the parliament, the armed revolutionaries shot at the roof-top ÁVH policemen.

Meanwhile, nationalist and anti-communist loyalties had fractured the chain of command of the Hungarian Army in response to the communist government's order to militarily repress the popular demonstrations against the Soviet control of Hungary. The Hungarian Army units in Budapest and in the countryside remained uninvolved in the Revolution, because local commanders avoided politics in order to avoid repressing the revolutionaries. Order was restored in the 24–29 October period after the Hungarian Army had fought 71 firefights with the nationalist and with the anti-communist revolutionaries in 50 communities. On 26 October, in the town of Kecskemét, outside the office of State Security and the local jail, Hungarian Army's Third Corps, led by Major General Lajos Gyurkó, shot seven anti-communist protestors and arrested the organizers of the anti-Soviet protest. On Gyurkó's order Hungarian Air Force fighter planes shot up demonstrators with cannon fire in various towns (see hu:Tiszakécskei sortűz), earning the praise of János Kádár after the defeat of the "counter-revolution" as "the only division commander who, at the call of the party organisation, swept the Danube-Tisza Interfluve six times, smashing everything".

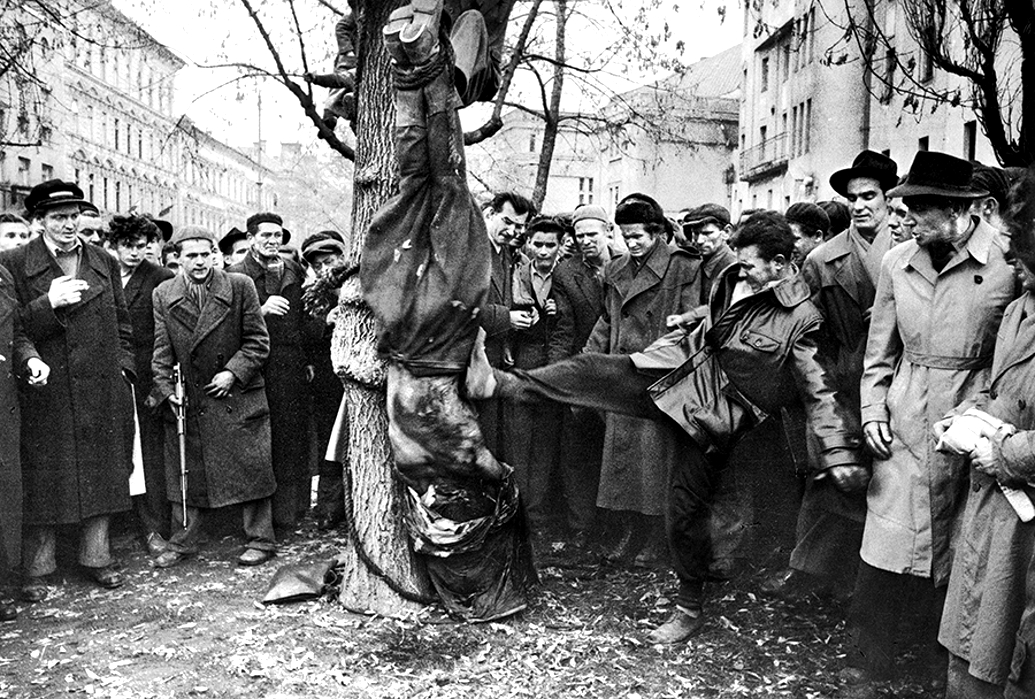
Protesters kicking the body of a slain ÁVH agent

As Hungarian revolutionaries fought the soldiers and tanks of the Red Army with small arms and Molotov cocktails in the streets of Budapest, throughout Hungary, revolutionary workers' councils assumed government power and called general strikes to halt the economy and the functioning of civil society. In ridding Hungary of the influence of and control from the USSR, the revolutionaries destroyed the symbols of Communism, such as the red star and Red Army monuments, and burned communist literature. Moreover, Revolutionary militias, such as the 400-man militia led by József Dudás attacked and murdered pro-Soviet Hungarians and ÁVH policemen. The Hungarian Army armoured division stationed in Budapest, commanded by Pál Maléter led the Hungarian Revolution against the USSR's control of Hungary, and negotiated ceasefire agreements with the revolutionaries; nonetheless, the Hungarian Revolution took many communist prisoners who were registered to lists that identified the prisoner either for summary execution or as an enemy of the people.

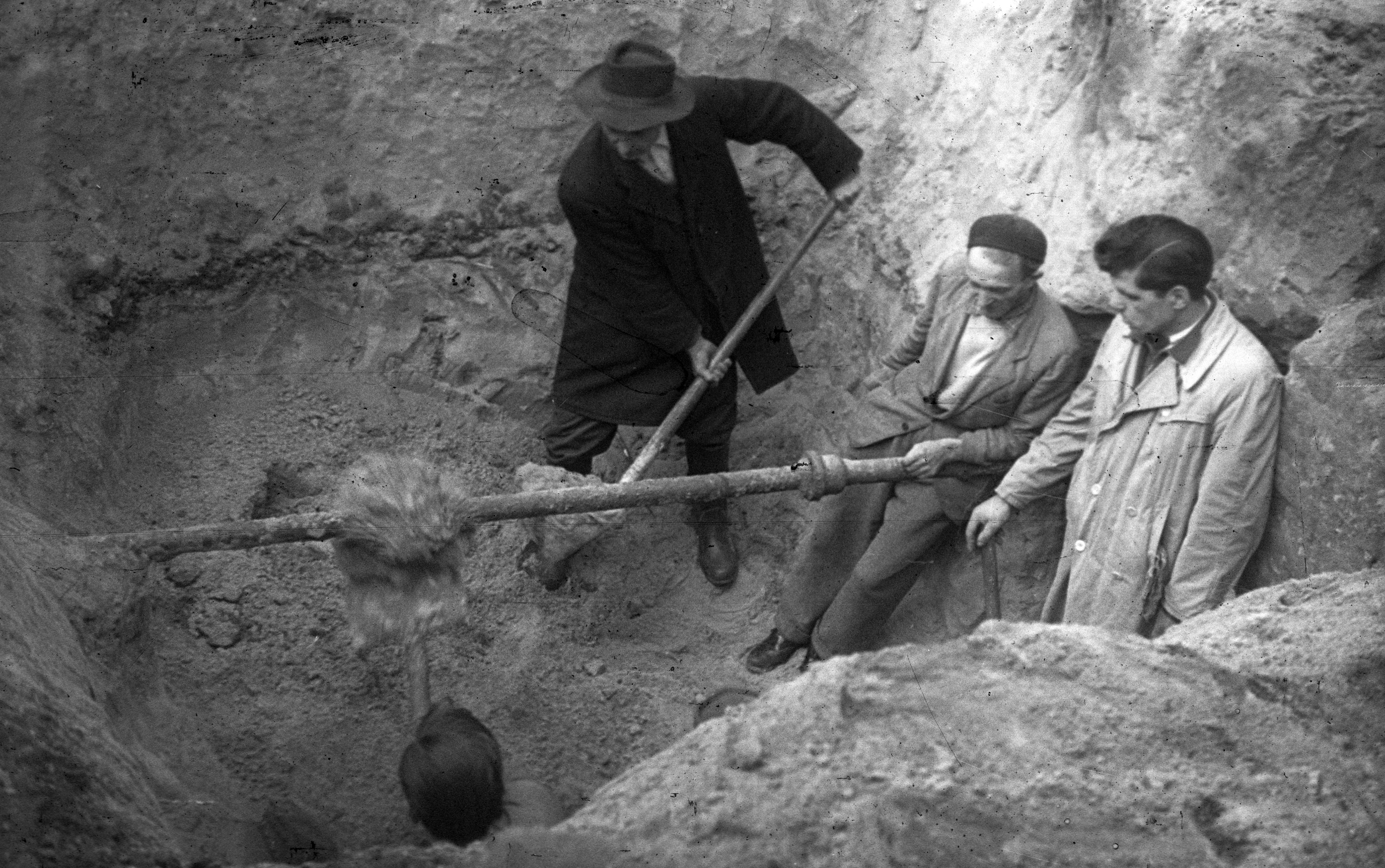
Suspected ÁVH agents digging at Republic Square in search of mass grave of Stalinist repressions and underground escape tunnels

In the Csepel area of Budapest, 250 communists defended the Csepel Iron and Steel Works, and, on 27 October, the Hungarian Army restored order in Csepel; two days later, the Hungarian Revolutionaries recaptured Csepel after the Hungarian Army's withdrawal on 29 October. In the Angyalföld area of Budapest, the communists and 350 armed workers and 380 communist soldiers defended the Láng factory. Anti-fascist Hungarian veterans of the Second World War participated in recapturing the offices of the Szabad Nép communist newspaper. At the town of Szarvas, armed guards defended the Hungarian Communist Party and the communist government of Hungary. In the event, the Revolutionaries' successful attacks upon the Parliament collapsed the communist government of Hungary; and Gerő and ex-PM András Hegedüs fled Hungary to the USSR; Nagy became prime minister, and János Kádár became the first secretary of the Hungarian Communist Party.

The Nagy government freed the political prisoner General Béla Király to restore order to Hungary with a National Guard force composed of policemen, soldiers, and Revolutionaries loyal to Hungary. On 30 October 1956, Király's National Guard attacked the building of the Central Committee of the Hungarian Communist Party and killed every pro-Soviet officer of the Hungarian Communist Party, ÁVH policeman, and pro-Soviet Hungarian soldier they encountered; and most Red Army troops withdrew from Budapest to garrisons in the Hungarian countryside.

=== Interlude ===
Fighting ceased between 28 October and 4 November, as many Hungarians believed that Soviet military units were withdrawing from Hungary. According to post-revolution communist sources, there were approximately 213 Hungarian Working People's Party members executed during the period.

==== New government ====
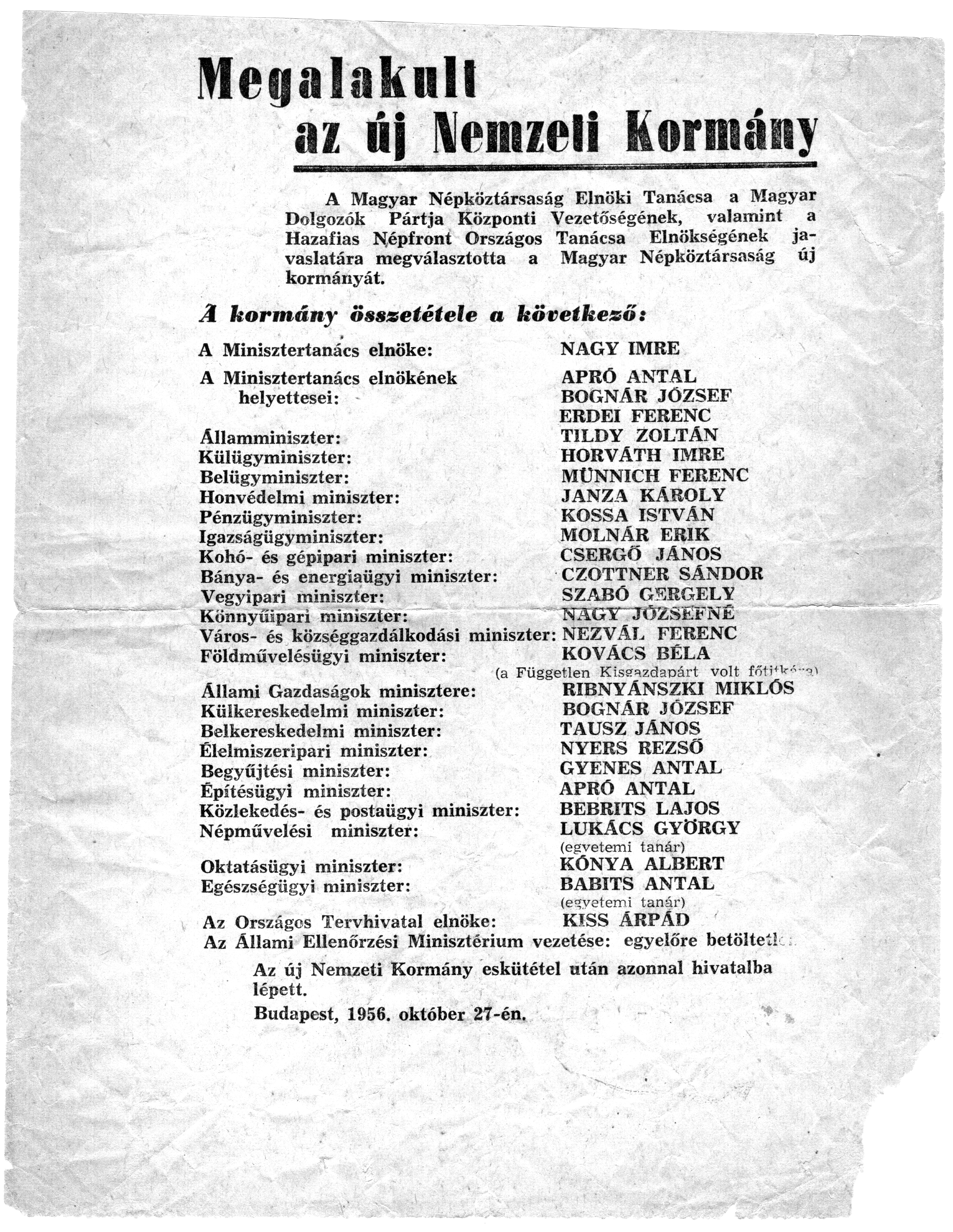
The political flyer announces: A New Government Has Been Formed. Prime Minister Imre Nagy is head of the government, 27 October 1956.

The new Nagy government was surprised by the rapidity with which the Hungarian Revolution extended from the streets of Budapest to all of Hungary, and the consequent collapse of the old Gerő–Hegedüs communist government. As head of government, Nagy asked every Hungarian to exercise political forbearance in order to restore civil order to Hungary. As the only Communist Hungarian leader with political credibility among Hungarians, the political actions of the Nagy government allowed the USSR to view the Hungarians' anti-Soviet protests as a popular uprising, rather than as an anti-communist counter-revolution. On 28 October 1956, the Nagy government announced the ceasefire among the nationalist, the anti-communist, and the Communist Hungarians, and that, to resolve the national crisis, Nagy would:

- consider the revolt as a "great, national and democratic event", and not an anti-communist counter-revolution
- effect an unconditional ceasefire and grant political amnesty for the revolutionaries
- negotiate with the revolutionaries
- disband the ÁVH security police
- establish a national guard for Hungary
- arrange the immediate withdrawal of the Red Army from Budapest and from Hungary

On 1 November, the Nagy government formally declared Hungary's withdrawal from the Warsaw Pact and Hungary's international status as a politically non-aligned country. Because of being in power for only ten days, the National Government did not explain their policies in detail; however, contemporary newspaper editorials stressed that Hungary should be a multiparty social democracy uninvolved in the Russo–American Cold War. About 8,000 political prisoners were released, most notably Cardinal József Mindszenty. Banned political parties, such as the Independent Smallholders and the National Peasant Party ("Petőfi Party"), reappeared to join the coalition.

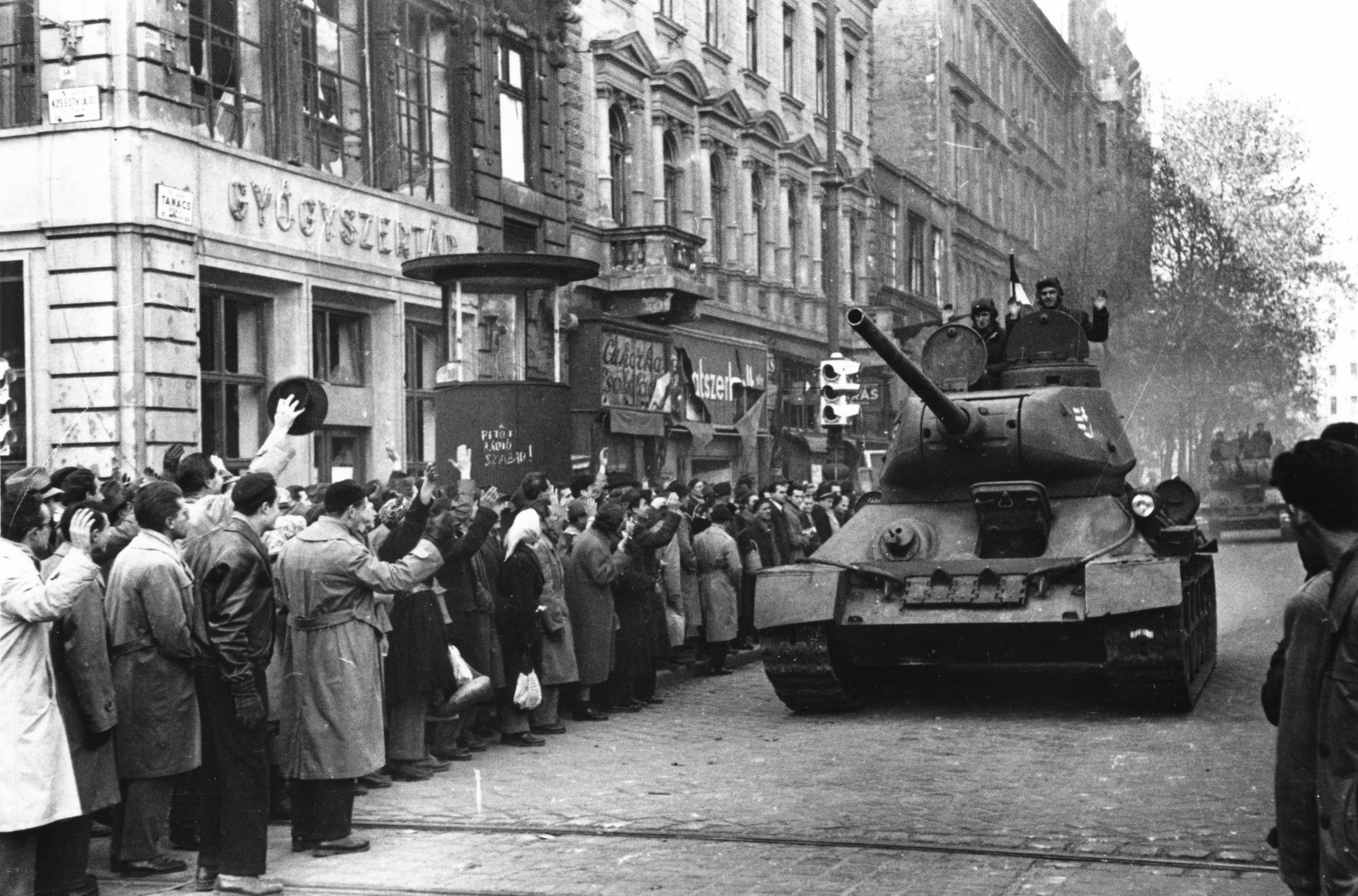
A crowd cheers Hungarian troops in Budapest.

In 1,170 communities in Hungary, there were 348 cases of revolutionary councils dismissing the local administrators; 312 cases of revolutionary councils sacking the bosses; and 215 cases of the locals burning the communist administrative records of their communities. In 681 communities, anti-communist and nationalist Hungarians damaged and destroyed symbols of the hegemony of the USSR, such as the Red Star, and statues of Stalin and of Lenin; 393 communities damaged Soviet war memorials; and 122 communities burned the books of Marx, Lenin, and Stalin.

Local revolutionary councils formed throughout Hungary, generally without involvement from the preoccupied National Government in Budapest, and assumed various responsibilities of local government from the defunct Communist party. By 30 October, the councils had been officially sanctioned by the Hungarian Working People's Party, and the Nagy government asked for their support as "autonomous, democratic local organs formed during the Revolution". Likewise, workers' councils were established at industrial plants and mines, and many unpopular regulations such as production norms were eliminated. The workers' councils strove to manage the enterprise while protecting workers' interests, establishing a socialist economy free of rigid party control. Local control by the councils was not always bloodless; in Debrecen, Győr, Sopron, Mosonmagyaróvár and other cities, crowds of demonstrators were fired upon by the ÁVH, with many lives lost. The ÁVH were disarmed, often by force, in many cases assisted by the local police.

In total, there were approximately 2,100 local revolutionary and workers councils with over 28,000 members. The councils held a combined conference in Budapest that decided to end the nationwide labour strikes and to resume work on 5 November, with the more important councils sending delegates to the Parliament to assure the Nagy government of their support.

==== Soviet perspective ====
On 24 October 1956, the Politburo of the USSR discussed how to resolve the political revolts that had occurred in Warsaw Pact countries, specifically the Polish October and the Hungarian Revolt. Led by Vyacheslav Molotov, the hardline faction of the CPSU voted for military intervention, but were opposed by Khrushchev and Marshal Georgy Zhukov who sought a political resolution to the Hungarian revolt. In Budapest, the Soviet delegation reported to Moscow that the Hungarian political situation was less confrontational than reported during the revolt proper. In pursuit of political resolution, Khrushchev said that Gerő's 23 October request for Soviet intervention indicated that the Hungarian Communist Party retained the confidence of the Hungarian people, because the Hungarians were protesting unresolved socio-economic problems, not ideology. Meanwhile, in the West, the concurrent Suez Crisis (29 October – 7 November 1956) of the French and the British empires' seizure of the Suez Canal from Egypt voided the political possibility of Western military intervention to Hungary. On 28 October, Khrushchev said that Soviet military intervention to Hungary would be a mistaken imitation of the Anglo–French intervention to Egypt.

In the Soviet Union, on 30 October 1956, the Presidium of the CPSU decided to not depose the new Hungarian government. Zhukov said: "We should withdraw troops from Budapest, and, if necessary, withdraw from Hungary, as a whole. This is a lesson for us in the military-political sphere". The Presidium then adopted and published the Declaration of the Government of the USSR on the Principles of Development and Further Strengthening of Friendship and Cooperation between the Soviet Union and other Socialist States, which said that "The Soviet Government is prepared to enter into the appropriate negotiations with the government of the Hungarian People's Republic, and [with] other members of the Warsaw Treaty, on the question of the presence of Soviet troops in the territory of Hungary."

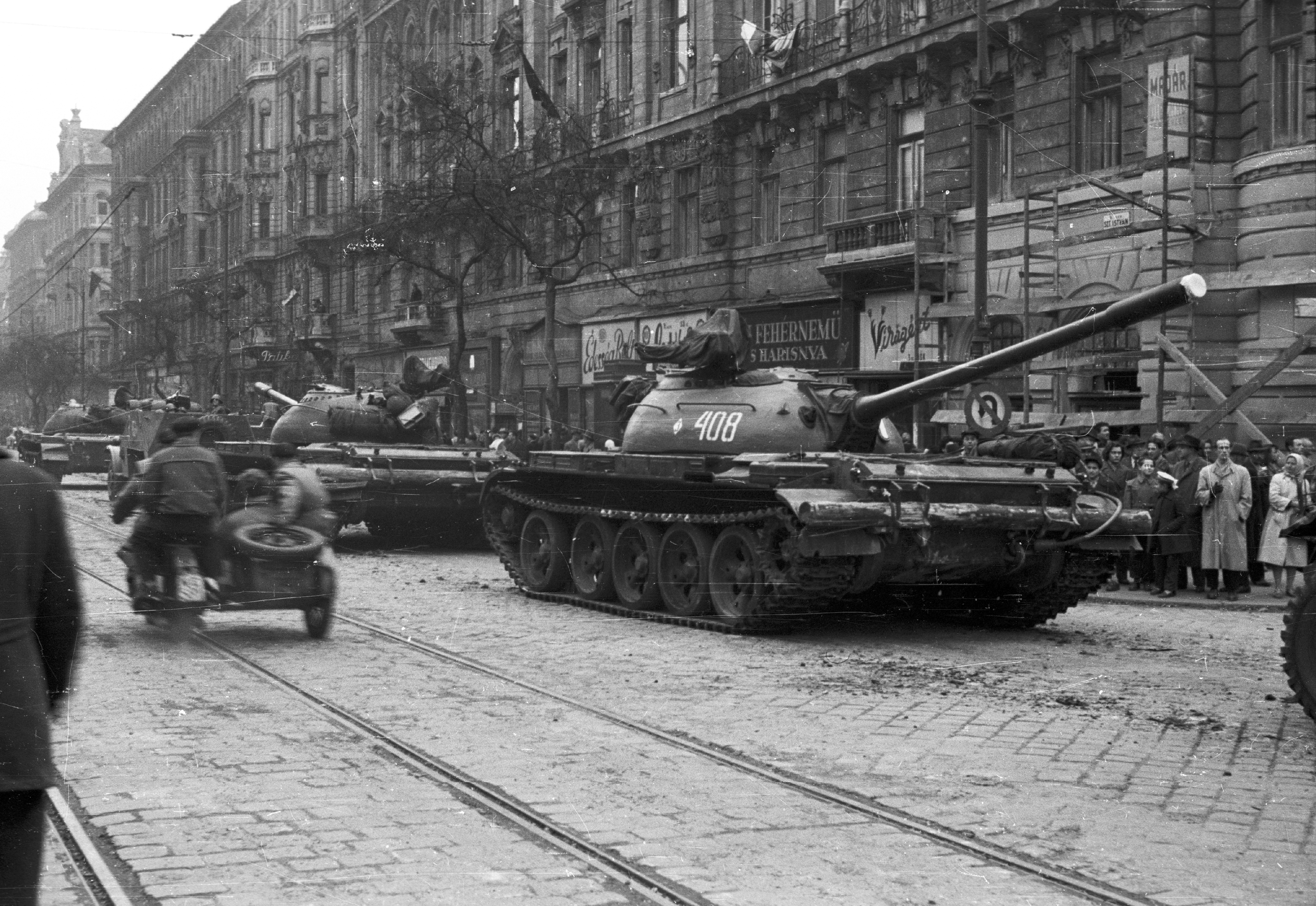
The Soviet repression of the Hungarian Revolution saw T-54 tanks patrolling the streets of Budapest, until the Red Army temporarily withdrew on 31 October 1956.

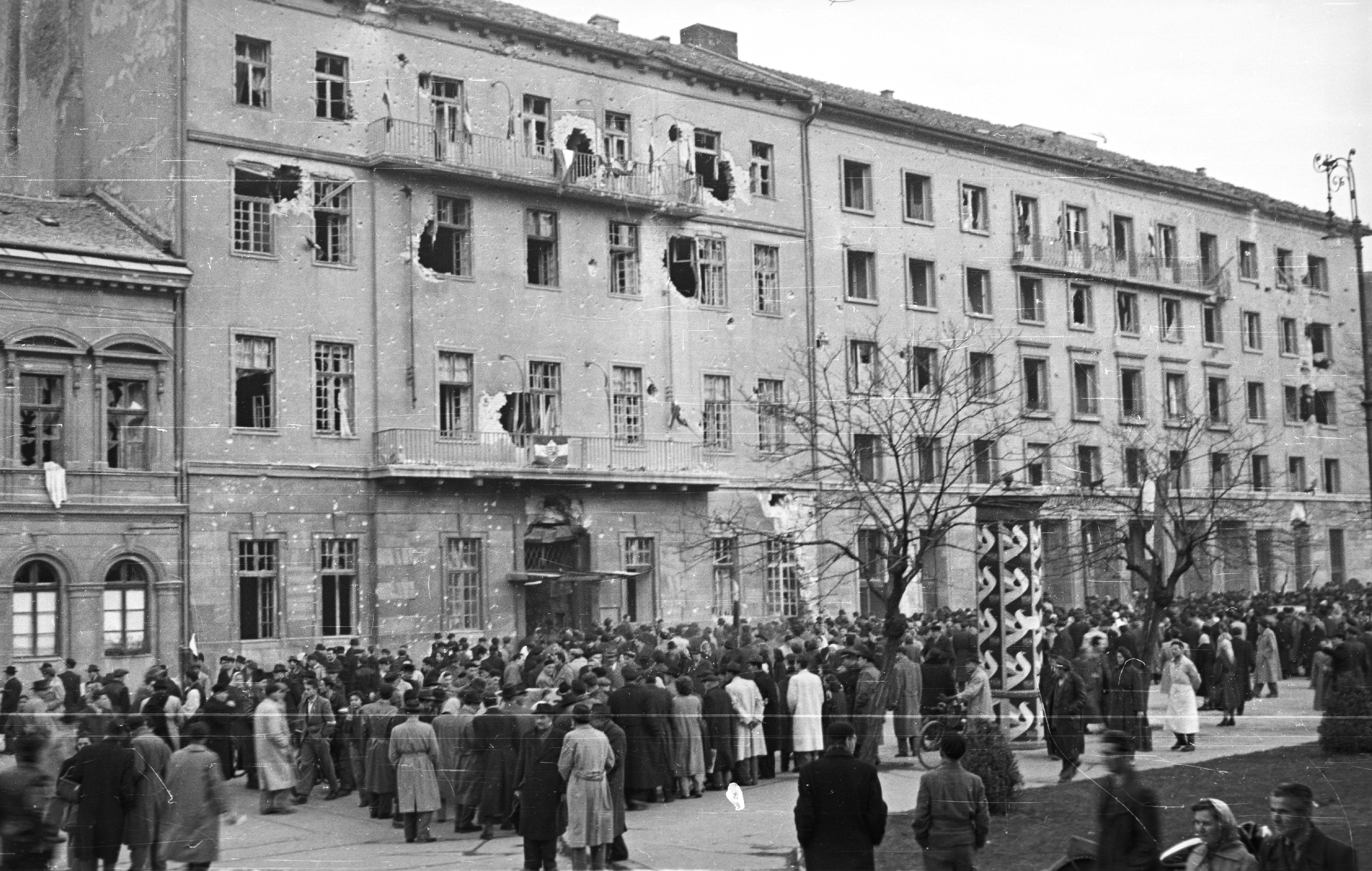
The damaged headquarters of the Hungarian Communist Party, on Köztársaság tér, in Budapest.

In Hungary, on 30 October, consequent to hearing rumours of that the secret police had anti-communist prisoners, and rumours of the ÁVH shooting anti-communist demonstrators in the city of Mosonmagyaróvár, armed protestors attacked the ÁVH detachment guarding the headquarters building of the Hungarian Working People's Party in Köztársaság tér (Republic Square), in Budapest. The anti-communists killed more than 20 ÁVH officers and ÁVH conscripts; the head of the Budapest party committee, Imre Mező, also was killed. Within hours, news reportage and filmed scenes of the Hungarian anti-communist revolt that occurred in Republic Square were broadcast in the USSR; and the CPSU made propaganda of the images of the communist victims of the Hungarian Revolt. The leaders of the Hungarian Revolution condemned the attack upon the ÁVH headquarters and asked the protestors to cease and desist from mob violence.

On 30 October, at Budapest, Anastas Mikoyan and Mikhail Suslov spoke with Nagy who told them that Hungarian geopolitical neutrality was a long-term political objective for the Hungarian People's Republic, which he wanted to discuss with the presidium of the CPSU. Khrushchev considered the geopolitical options for the USSR's resolving the Hungarian anti-communist revolution, but Nagy's declaration of Hungarian neutrality decided his dispatching the Red Army into Hungary. The USSR invaded the Hungarian People's Republic, because:

- Simultaneous political movements towards multi-party, parliamentary democracy, and a democratic national council of workers might "lead towards a capitalist state" in Hungary and Poland, each movement challenged the authority of communist parties in eastern Europe.
- The militarists in the CPSU would not understand the USSR's failure to intervene in Hungary. That de-Stalinisation had alienated the hardline members of the CPSU, for whom anti-communist protests threatened Soviet hegemony in eastern Europe. That the workers' uprising in East Germany (17 June 1953) – the repression of which killed 84 protestors and produced 700 anti-communist prisoners – required a new Communist government for the German Democratic Republic. That the workers' protests at Poznań (June 1956) – the repression of which killed 57–78 anti-communist protestors – created the Polish October movement, which installed a Polish Communist government less dependent on orders from Moscow.
- Hungarian geopolitical neutrality and withdrawal from the Warsaw Pact breached the buffer zone of satellite states by which the USSR protected themselves from invasion.

In the People's Republic of Hungary, the anti-communist militants concluded that "the [Hungarian Communist] Party is the incarnation of bureaucratic despotism" and that "socialism can develop only on the foundations of direct democracy." For the anti-communists, the struggle of the Hungarian workers was "for the principle of direct democracy" and that "all power should be transferred to the Workers Committees of Hungary." In response, the Presidium broke the de facto ceasefire and repressed the Hungarian Revolution. The Soviet Union's plan was to declare a "Provisional Revolutionary Government" led by János Kádár, who would appeal for Soviet assistance to restore order to Hungary. Kádár was in Moscow in early November, and was in communication with the Soviet embassy whilst still a member of the Nagy government. The USSR sent diplomatic delegations to other communist governments in Eastern Europe and to the People's Republic of China in effort to avoid misunderstandings that might provoke to regional conflicts, and broadcast propaganda explaining their second Soviet intervention to Hungary. The Soviet diplomats disguised their intentions by engaging the Nagy government in talks about withdrawing the Red Army from Hungary.

Moreover, Mao Zedong influenced Khrushchev's decision to repress the Hungarian uprising. The deputy chairman of the Chinese Communist Party (CCP), Liu Shaoqi, pressed Khrushchev to militarily repress the Hungarian Revolution. Although Sino–Soviet relations were unstable, the opinion of Mao carried great weight among the members of the Presidium of the CPSU. Initially, Mao opposed a second intervention, which was communicated to Khrushchev on 30 October, before the Presidium met and decided against a Hungarian intervention; later, Mao changed his mind and supported intervention to Hungary.

In the 1–3 November 1956 period, Khrushchev informed the USSR's Warsaw Pact allies of his decision to repress the Hungarian Revolution. Khrushchev met with the Polish communist politician Władysław Gomułka in Brest, Belarus; and then spoke with the Romanian, Czechoslovak, and Bulgarian leaders in Bucharest, Romania. Finally, Khrushchev went to the Socialist Federal Republic of Yugoslavia and spoke with Tito who persuaded Khrushchev to install Kádár as the new leader of the People's Republic of Hungary, instead of Ferenc Münnich. Two months after the USSR repressed the Hungarian Revolution, Tito told Nikolay Firyubin, the Soviet ambassador to Yugoslavia, that "(political) reaction raised its head, especially in Croatia, where the reactionary elements openly incited the employees of the Yugoslav security organs to violence."

==== Polish response ====
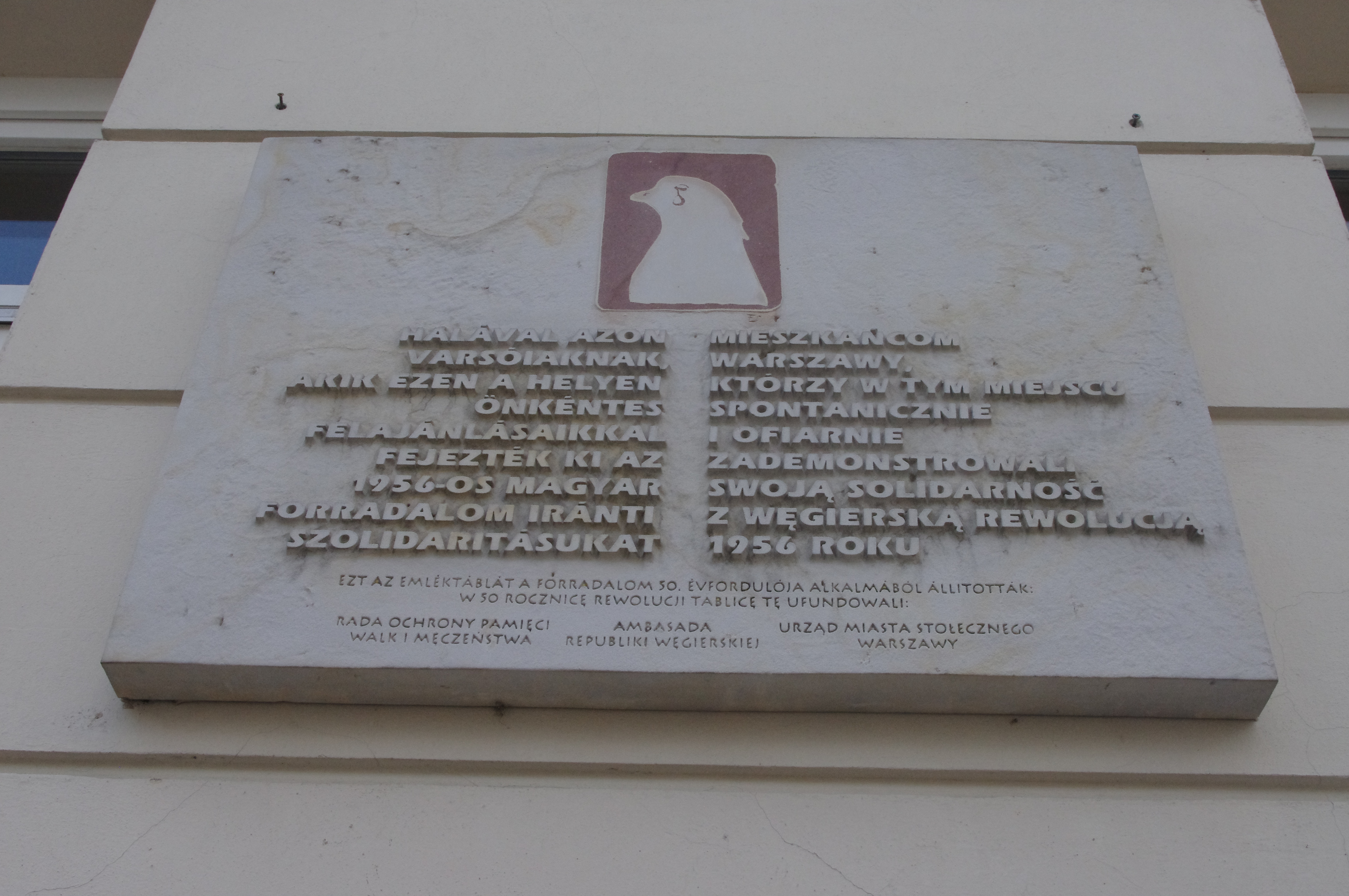
Plaque commemorating Polish-Hungarian solidarity during the Hungarian revolution of 1956, at Krakowskie Przedmieście Street 5, in Warsaw.

The events in Hungary were met with a spontaneous reaction in Poland. Hungarian flags were displayed in many Polish towns and villages. After the Soviet invasion, the help given by the ordinary Poles to Hungarians took on a considerable scale. Citizen organizations and self-acting aid committees were established throughout Poland to distribute aid to the Hungarian population, e.g. the Social Civic Committee of Creative Associations (Bydgoszcz), the Student Committee for Aid to Hungarians (Kraków), the Society of Friends of Hungarians (Tarnów), the Committee to Aid the Hungarians (Lublin), and the Committee for Aid to Hungarians (Człuchów). In addition to the official support coordinated by the Polish Red Cross, one convoy was dispatched – one organized by the Student Aid Committee for Hungarians from Kraków. Other such initiatives were prevented.

By 12 November, over 11,000 honorary blood donors had registered throughout Poland. Polish Red Cross statistics show that by air transport alone (15 aircraft), 44 tonnes of medication, blood, and other medical supplies were delivered to Hungary. Assistance sent using road and rail transport was much higher. Polish aid is estimated at a value of approximately US$2 million in 1956 dollars.

==== Austrian response ====
The events resulted in the first-time interpretation of Austria's neutrality, which was adopted a year earlier, in 1955, with the Austrian State Treaty. Both armed Hungarians and Soviet troops were instructed to fully respect Austria's territorial integrity. One Soviet soldier was shot dead after crossing into Austria.

Meanwhile, refugees and humanitarian aid could freely traverse the border. Austria temporarily housed about 180.000 Hungarian refugees and sent medication shipments.

==== International perspective ====
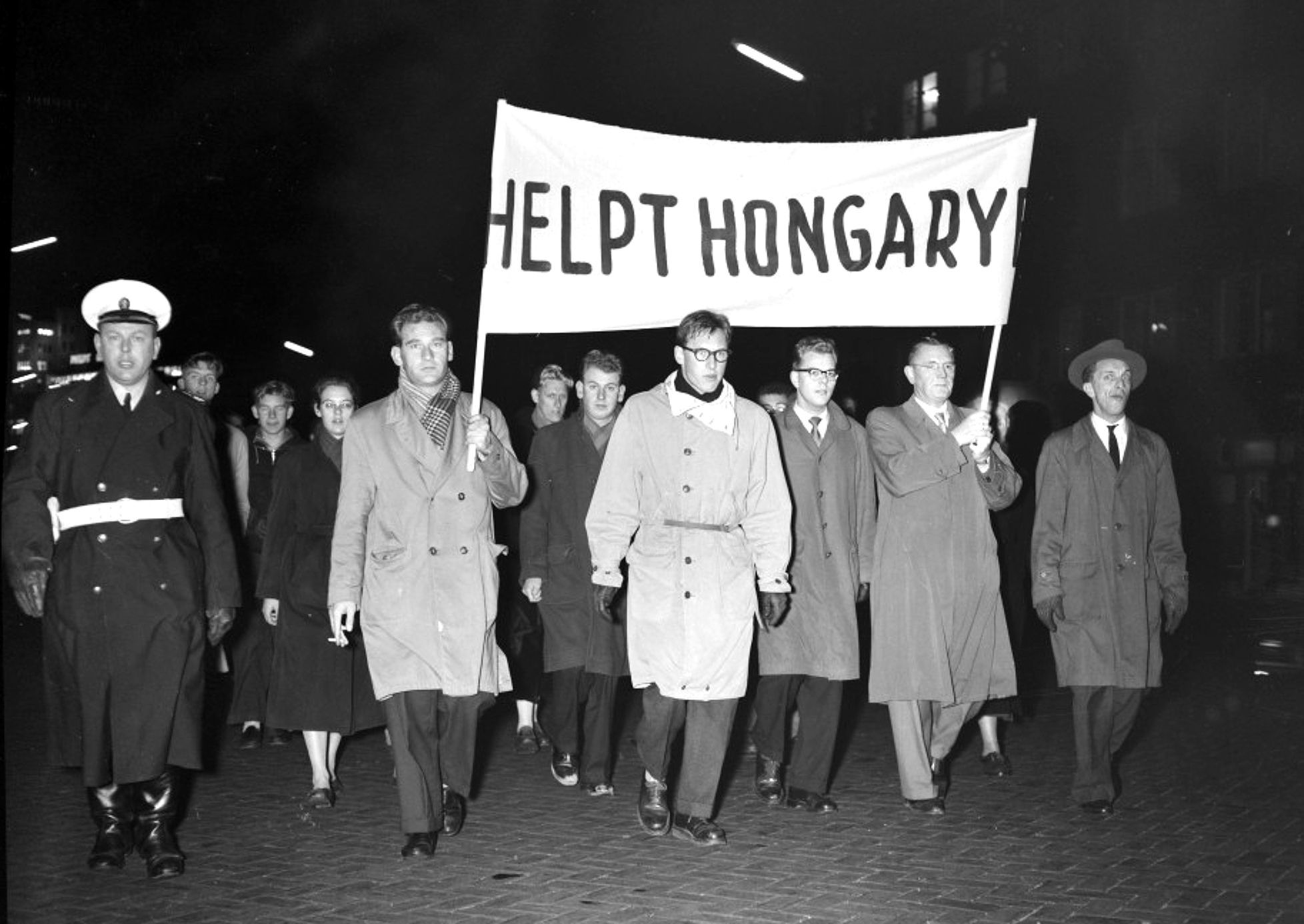
Dutch anti-communists march in support of the Hungarian Revolution in Eindhoven, Netherlands on 5 November 1956

On 24 October 1956, U.S. Secretary of State John Foster Dulles (r. 1953–1959) recommended that the United Nations Security Council convene to discuss the USSR's invasion and occupation of the Hungarian People's Republic, without decisive result, because, despite the Protocol of Sèvres (22–24 October 1956), the Suez Crisis prevented the West from criticizing the imperialism of the USSR; the U.S. vice president Richard Nixon said that: "We couldn't, on one hand, complain about the Soviets intervening in Hungary, and, on the other hand, approve of the British and the French picking that particular time to intervene against [Gamal Abdel] Nasser." Despite earlier demands for the rollback of communism and of the leftist liberation of eastern Europe, Dulles told the USSR that: "We do not see these states [Hungary and Poland] as potential military allies."

On 4 November 1956, the USSR vetoed the Security Council's resolution criticising the USSR's invasion of Hungary. In its stead, United Nations Security Council Resolution 120 was passed, which charged the General Assembly to meet to discuss the matter. Despite 50 votes for withdrawal, 8 votes against withdrawal, and 15 abstentions from the matter, the communist Kádár government of Hungary rejected the presence of UN observers in the Hungarian People's Republic.

In the U.S., two facts determined the inaction of the Eisenhower government: (i) the U.S. Army study, Hungary, Resistance Activities and Potentials (January 1956), which recommended against U.S. military intervention to Hungary on the side of the Hungarian revolutionists; and (ii) the secret warfare of the National Security Council that encouraged anti-communist political discontent in the Eastern Bloc only through psychological warfare, sabotage, and economic warfare.

During the revolution, a captured Soviet T-54 tank was driven by insurgents to the British embassy, where it was inspected by British Lieutenant Colonel James Cowley. An examination of the vehicle's armor led to the subsequent development of the Royal Ordnance L7 gun, which could defeat the T-54's armor more effectively than existing tank guns. Afterwards, the tank was returned to the Soviets.

According to A. Ross Johnson in the International Journal of Intelligence and CounterIntelligence: "Contrary to allegations that continue to this day, RFE Hungarian broadcasts did not foment revolution, urge Hungarians to fight the Soviets, or promise Western assistance. They did criticize would-be reform leader Imre Nagy in personally vituperative terms and contained emotional bombast that Hungarian listeners could easily have interpreted as indicating Western solidarity and support." After the USSR defeated the anti-communist Hungarian Revolution, the revolutionists criticised the CIA and its RFE network for having deceived the Hungarians into believing that the West—NATO and the US—would expel the USSR from the Hungarian People's Republic. Although incitements to violence were officially against RFE policy, an internal analysis by RFE adviser William Griffith found, as summarized by the National Security Archive at George Washington University, that "RFE broadcasts in several cases had implied that foreign aid would be forthcoming if the Hungarians succeeded in establishing a 'central military command'" and "appealed to the Hungarians to 'continue to fight vigorously'". Griffith himself wrote that "There were relatively few real policy violations"—specifically four out of more than 300 broadcasts under review—but conceded that "summaries often failed to reflect the content of the program as it was finally written (this is not the case only with programs where policy violation occurred; the summaries during the period under review in many other cases proved to be very inaccurate descriptions of the programs finally produced)." László Borhi, writing in the Journal of Cold War Studies, states that the RFE broadcasts sanctioned by CIA official Cord Meyer were often "incautious, even reckless" and undermined parallel efforts by the Eisenhower administration to negotiate Hungarian independence in a framework similar to Finlandization: "These contradictory policies sabotaged the overall approach. The harder the insurgents fought, the less chance there was for a negotiated settlement. But the unwillingness of the United States to counter Soviet military action meant that the Hungarian quest for liberation was suicidal."

In 1998, the Hungarian ambassador Géza Jeszenszky criticised Western inaction in 1956 as disingenuous, recalling that the political influence of the United Nations readily applied to resolving the Korean War (1950–1953). Moreover, the study Hungary, 1956: Reviving the Debate over U.S. (In)action During the Revolution confirms that the Eisenhower government did not intervene to the Hungarian Revolution – which occurred in the Soviet sphere of influence – because the USSR would have responded with a nuclear war.

== Soviet invasion ==
1 November newsreel about the situation in Hungary

On 1 November, Nagy received reports that Soviet forces had entered Hungary from the east and were moving towards Budapest. Nagy sought and received assurances, which proved to be false, from Soviet Ambassador Yuri Andropov that the Soviet Union would not invade. The Cabinet, with Kádár in agreement, declared Hungary's neutrality, withdrew from the Warsaw Pact and requested assistance from the diplomatic corps in Budapest and Dag Hammarskjöld, UN Secretary-General, to defend Hungary's neutrality. Andropov was asked to inform his government that Hungary would begin negotiations on the removal of Soviet forces immediately.

On 3 November, a Hungarian delegation led by Defence Minister Pál Maléter was invited to attend negotiations on Soviet withdrawal at the Soviet Military Command at Tököl, near Budapest. At around midnight that evening, General Ivan Serov, Chief of the Soviet Security Police (KGB) ordered the arrest of the Hungarian delegation, and the next day, the Soviet army again attacked Budapest.

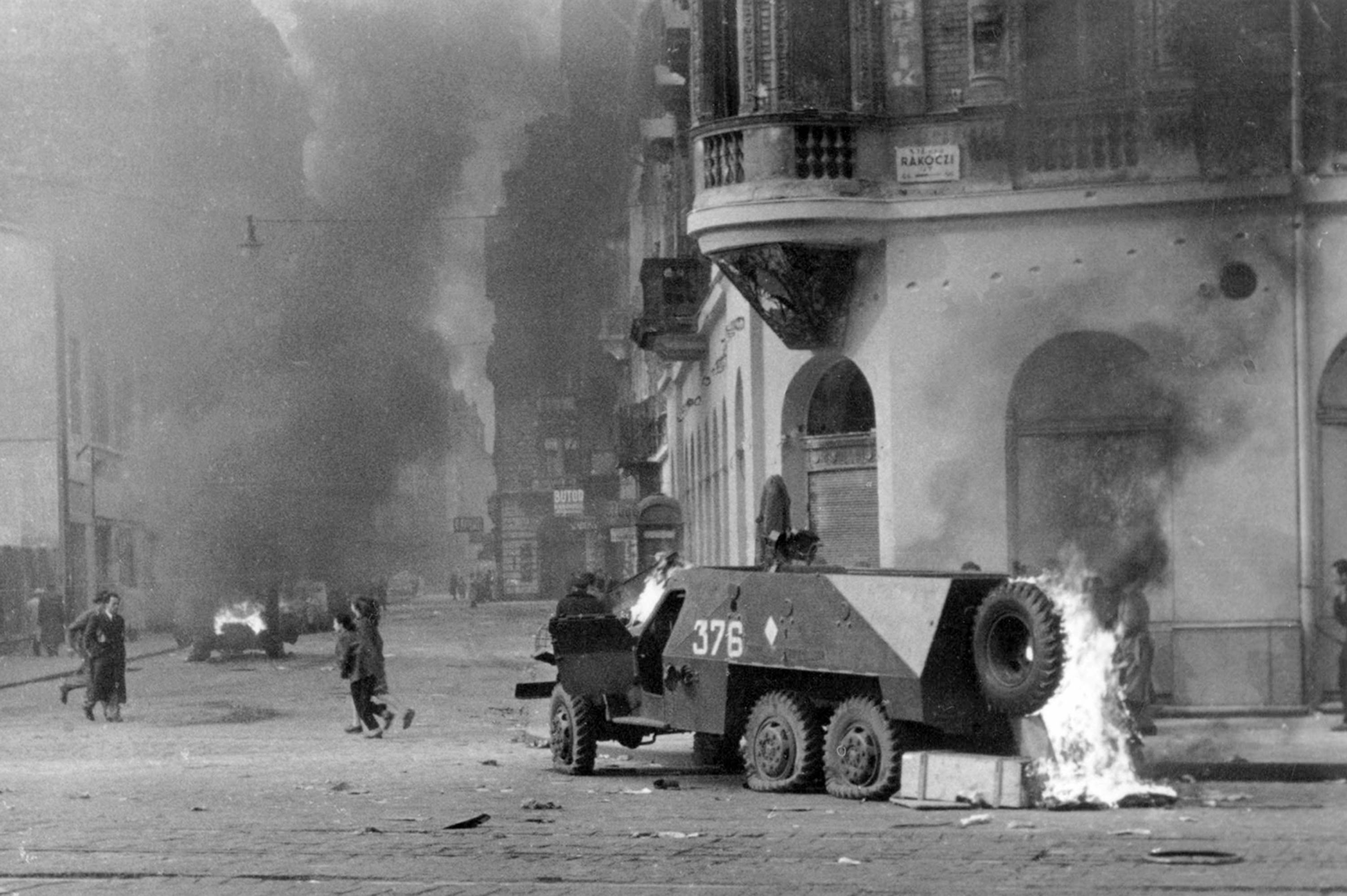
A Soviet-built BTR-152 armored personnel carrier burns on a Budapest street, November 1956.

The second Soviet intervention, codenamed "Operation Whirlwind", was launched by Marshal Ivan Konev. The five Soviet divisions stationed in Hungary before 23 October were reinforced; Soviet forces soon reached a total strength of 17 divisions. The 8th Mechanized Army under command of Lieutenant General Hamazasp Babadzhanian and the 38th Army under Lieutenant General Hadzhi-Umar Mamsurov from the nearby Carpathian Military District were deployed to Hungary for the operation. Some rank-and-file Soviet soldiers reportedly believed they were being sent to East Berlin to fight German fascists. By 21:30 on 3 November, the Soviet Army had completely encircled Budapest.

At 03:00 on 4 November, Soviet tanks penetrated Budapest along the Pest side of the Danube in two thrusts: one up the Soroksári road from the south and the other down the Váci road from the north. Thus, before a single shot was fired, the Soviets had effectively split the city into two, controlled all bridgeheads and were shielded to the rear by the wide Danube River. Armoured units crossed into Buda and, at 04:25, fired the first shots at the army barracks on Budaörsi Road. Soon, Soviet artillery and tank fire were heard in all of the districts of Budapest. Operation Whirlwind combined air strikes, artillery, and the co-ordinated tank–infantry action of 17 divisions. The Soviet army deployed T-34-85 medium tanks as well as the new T-54s, heavy IS-3 tanks, 152mm ISU-152 mobile assault guns and open-top BTR-152 armored personnel carriers.

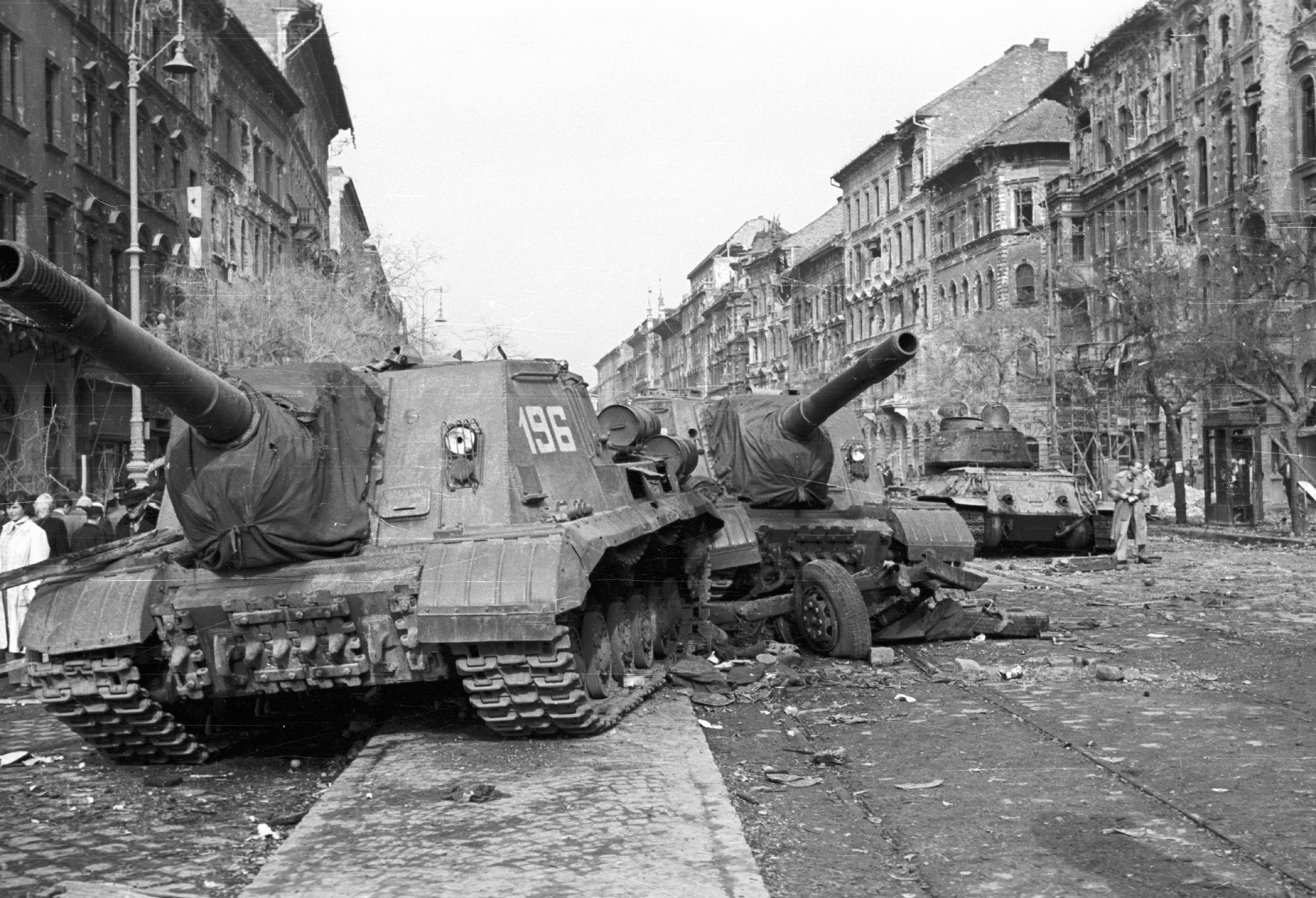
Two disabled Soviet ISU-152 assault guns in Budapest's 8th District with an abandoned T-34/85 tank in the background

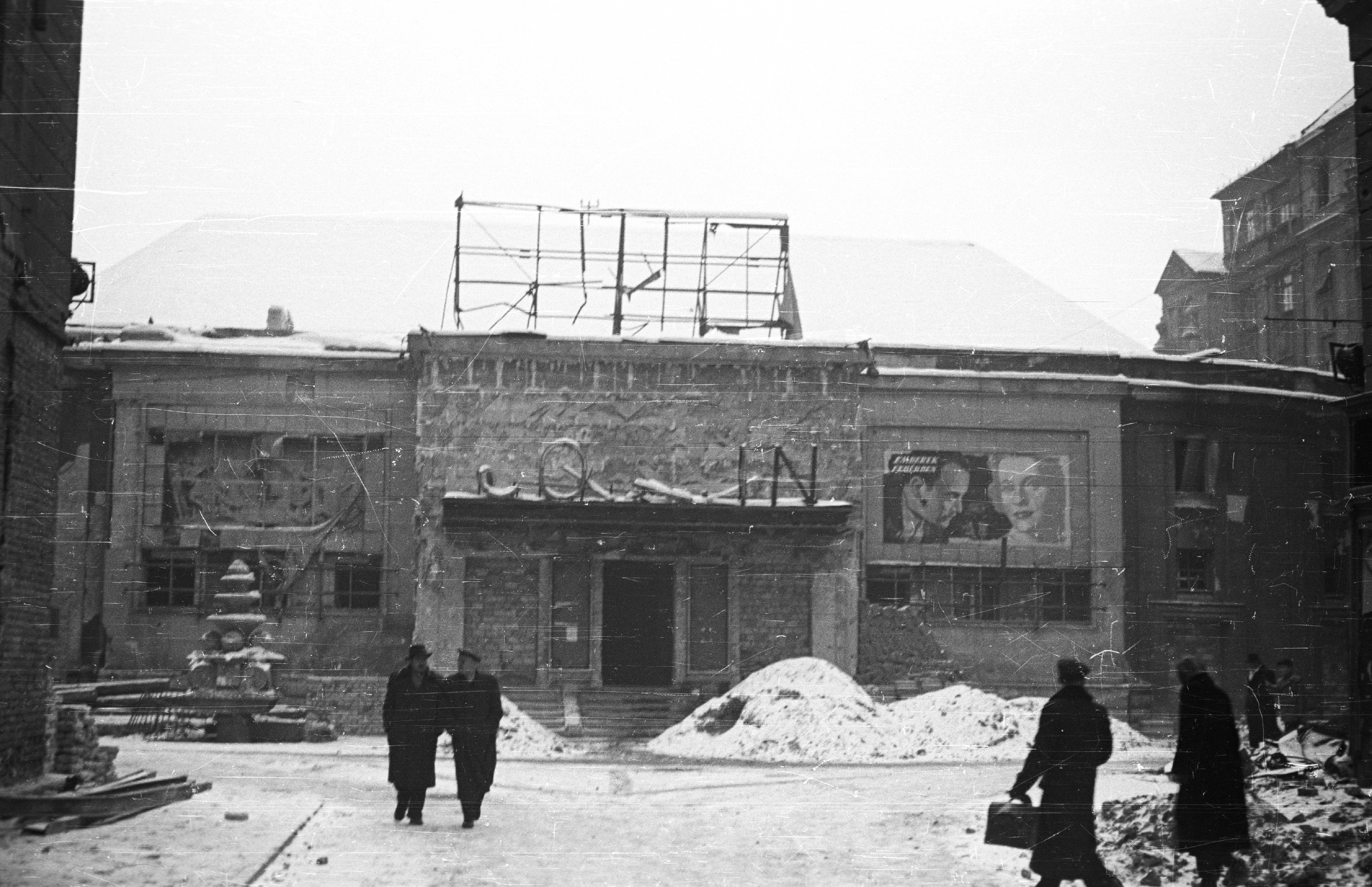
Corvin Cinema after the end of the revolution

Between 4 and 9 November, the Hungarian Army put up sporadic and disorganised resistance, with Zhukov reporting the disarming of twelve divisions, two armoured regiments and the entire Hungarian Air Force. Hungarian fighters continued their most formidable resistance in various districts of Budapest (most famously the Battle of the Corvin Passage), in and around the city of Pécs in the Mecsek Mountains, and in the industrial centre of Dunaújváros (then called Sztálinváros). There were ten to fifteen thousand resistance fighters fighting in Budapest, with the heaviest fighting occurring in the working-class stronghold of Csepel on the Danube River. Although some very senior officers were openly pro-Soviet, rank-and-file soldiers were overwhelmingly loyal to the revolution and either fought the invasion or deserted. The UN reported that there were no recorded incidents of Hungarian Army units fighting for the Soviets.

At 05:20 on 4 November, Nagy broadcast his final plea to the nation and the world, announcing that Soviet forces were attacking Budapest and that the government was remaining at its post. The radio station, Free Kossuth Rádió, stopped broadcasting at 08:07. An emergency Cabinet meeting was held in the Parliament but was attended by only three ministers. As Soviet troops arrived to occupy the building, a negotiated evacuation ensued, leaving Minister of State István Bibó as the last representative of the National Government remaining at his post. He wrote For Freedom and Truth, a stirring proclamation to the nation and the world.

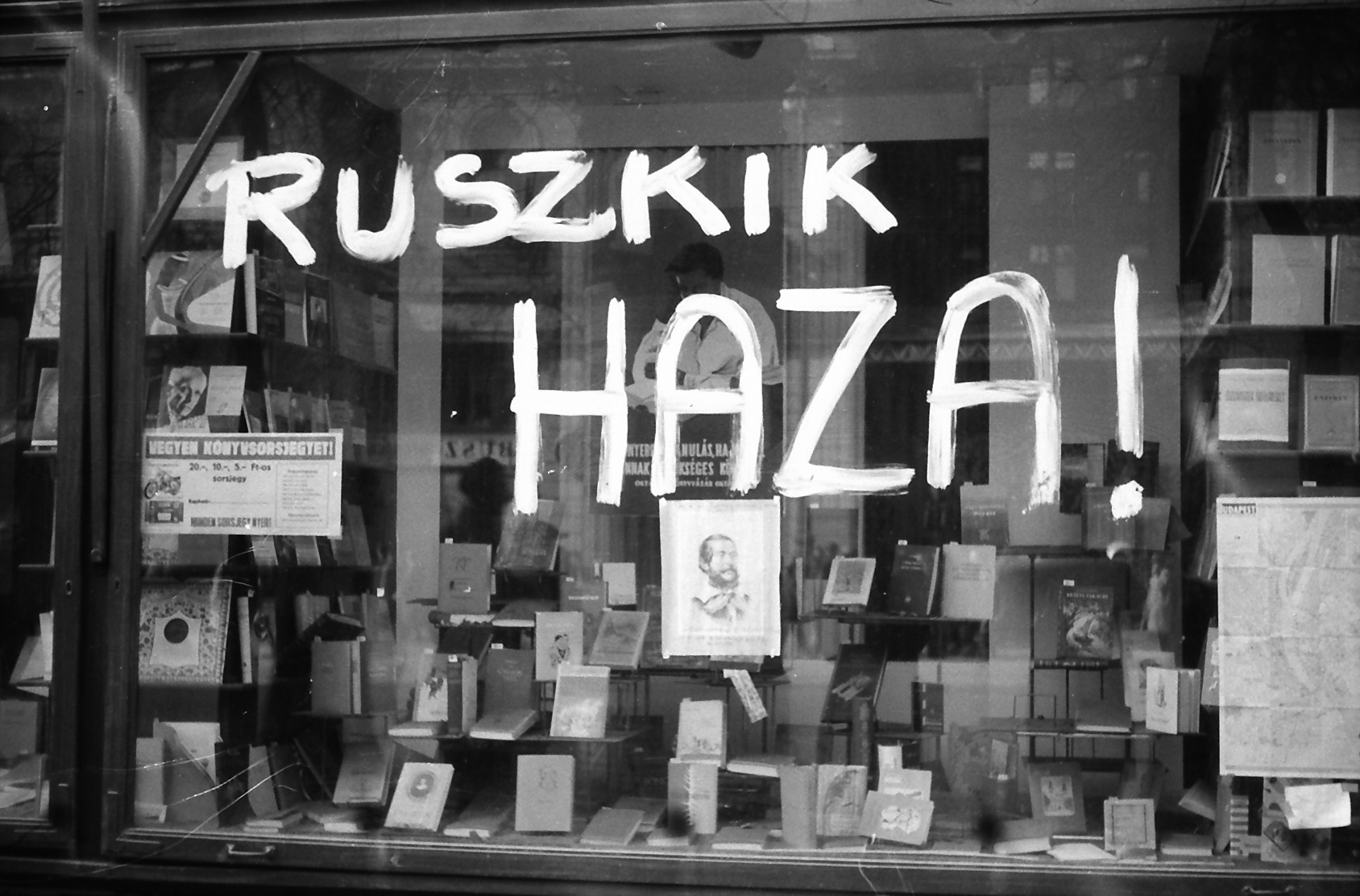
Ruszkik haza! ("Russians go home!") slogan in Budapest

At 06:00, 4 November, in the town of Szolnok, Kádár proclaimed the "Hungarian Revolutionary Worker-Peasant Government". His statement declared: "We must put an end to the excesses of the counter-revolutionary elements. The hour for action has sounded. We are going to defend the interest of the workers and peasants and the achievements of the people's democracy."

Later that evening, Kádár called upon "the faithful fighters of the true cause of socialism" to come out of hiding and take up arms. Hungarian support did not materialise, and fighting did not take the form of a civil war, but rather, in the words of a United Nations report, that of "a well-equipped foreign army crushing by overwhelming force a national movement and eliminating the Government".

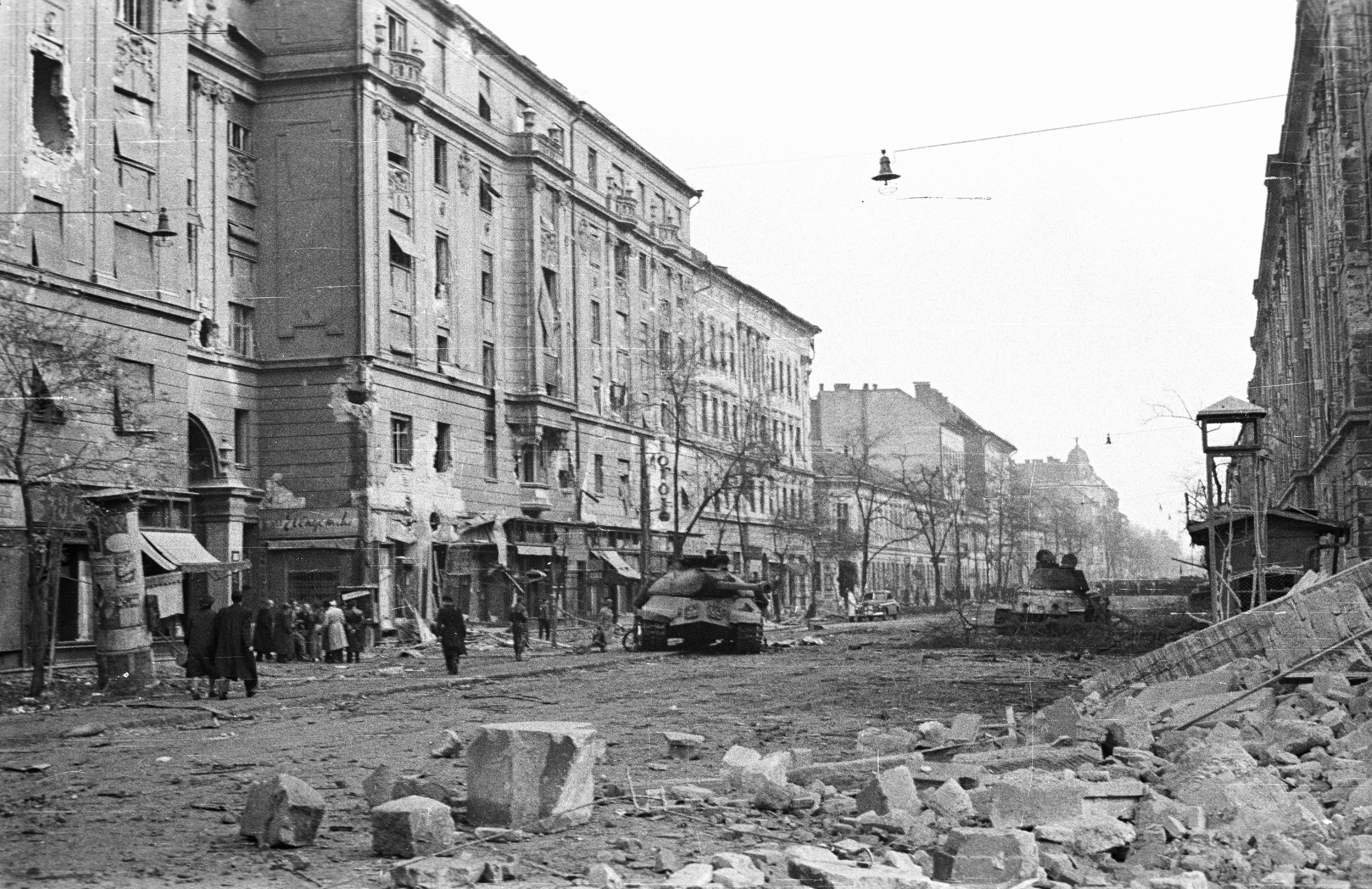
Rubble after the end of fighting in Budapest's 8th District

By 08:00, organised defence of the city evaporated after the radio station had been seized, and many defenders fell back to fortified positions. Between 08:00 and 09:00, the parliamentary guard laid down its arms, and forces under Major General Kuzma Grebennik captured Parliament and liberated captured ministers of the Rákosi–Hegedüs government. Among the liberated were István Dobi and Sándor Rónai, both of whom became members of the re-established socialist Hungarian government. As Soviet troops also came under attack in civilian quarters, they were unable to differentiate military from civilian targets. For that reason, Soviet tanks often crept along main roads and fired indiscriminately into buildings. Hungarian resistance was strongest in the industrial areas of Budapest, with Csepel heavily targeted by Soviet artillery and air strikes.

The last holdouts against the Soviet assault were located in Csepel and in Dunaújváros, where fighting lasted until 11 November, before insurgents finally succumbed to the Soviets. When the fighting ended, Hungarian casualties totalled approximately 2,500 dead and 20,000 wounded. Budapest bore the brunt of the bloodshed, with 1,569 civilians killed. Approximately 53% of the dead were workers; half of all Hungarian casualties were people younger than 30. On the Soviet side, 699 men were killed, 1,450 wounded, and 51 missing in action. An estimated 80% of all Soviet casualties occurred in the fighting against insurgents in the eighth and ninth districts of Budapest.

=== Soviet perspective ===
Soviet reports of the events surrounding, during and after the disturbance were remarkably consistent in their accounts, more so after the Second Soviet intervention cemented support for the Soviet position among international communist parties. Pravda published an account 36 hours after the outbreak of violence that set the tone for all further reports and subsequent Soviet historiography:

1. On the afternoon of Tuesday, October 23, 1956, the "honest", socialist, Hungarian working people staged a demonstration against the anti-party mistakes committed by the Rákosi and Gero governments.
2. Fascist, Hitlerite, reactionary, counter-revolutionary hooligans, financed, trained, and equipped by the imperialist, capitalist west, took advantage of the demonstration to begin a counter-revolution.
3. The honest Hungarian working people under Imre Nagy appealed to Soviet forces stationed in Hungary under the Warsaw Pact for assistance in restoring order.
4. The Nagy government proved to be weak, and it permitted counter-revolutionary influences to penetrate its ranks. It became helpless and fell apart. This is demonstrated by the fact that Nagy denounced the Warsaw Pact.
5. The Hungarian patriots under János Kádár broke with the Nagy government and formed the Hungarian revolutionary workers and peasants government. This genuinely popular government asked the Soviet command for help in suppressing the counter-revolution.
6. The Hungarian patriots, assisted by Soviet forces, smashed the counter-revolution.

The first Soviet report came out 24 hours after the first Western report. Nagy's appeal to the United Nations was not reported. After Nagy was arrested outside the Yugoslav embassy, his arrest was not reported. Also, accounts failed to explain how Nagy went from patriot to traitor. The Soviet press reported calm in Budapest, but the Western press reported a revolutionary crisis was breaking out. According to the Soviet account, Hungarians never wanted a revolution at all.

In January 1957, representatives of the Soviet Union, Bulgaria, Hungary, and Romania met in Budapest to review internal developments in Hungary since the establishment of the Soviet-imposed government. A communiqué on the meeting "unanimously concluded" that Hungarian workers, with the leadership of the Kádár government and the support of the Soviet army, defeated attempts "to eliminate the socialist achievements of the Hungarian people".

The Soviet, Chinese, and Warsaw Pact governments urged Kádár to proceed with the interrogation and trial of the ministers of the Nagy government, and asked for punitive measures against the "counter-revolutionists". In addition, the Kádár government published an extensive series of "white books" (The Counter-Revolutionary Forces in the October Events in Hungary) that documented real incidents of violence against Communist Party and ÁVH members and the confessions of Nagy's supporters. The "white books" were widely distributed in several languages in most socialist countries and, while based in fact, they present factual evidence with a colouring and narrative that are not generally supported by non-Soviet-aligned historians.

== Aftermath ==
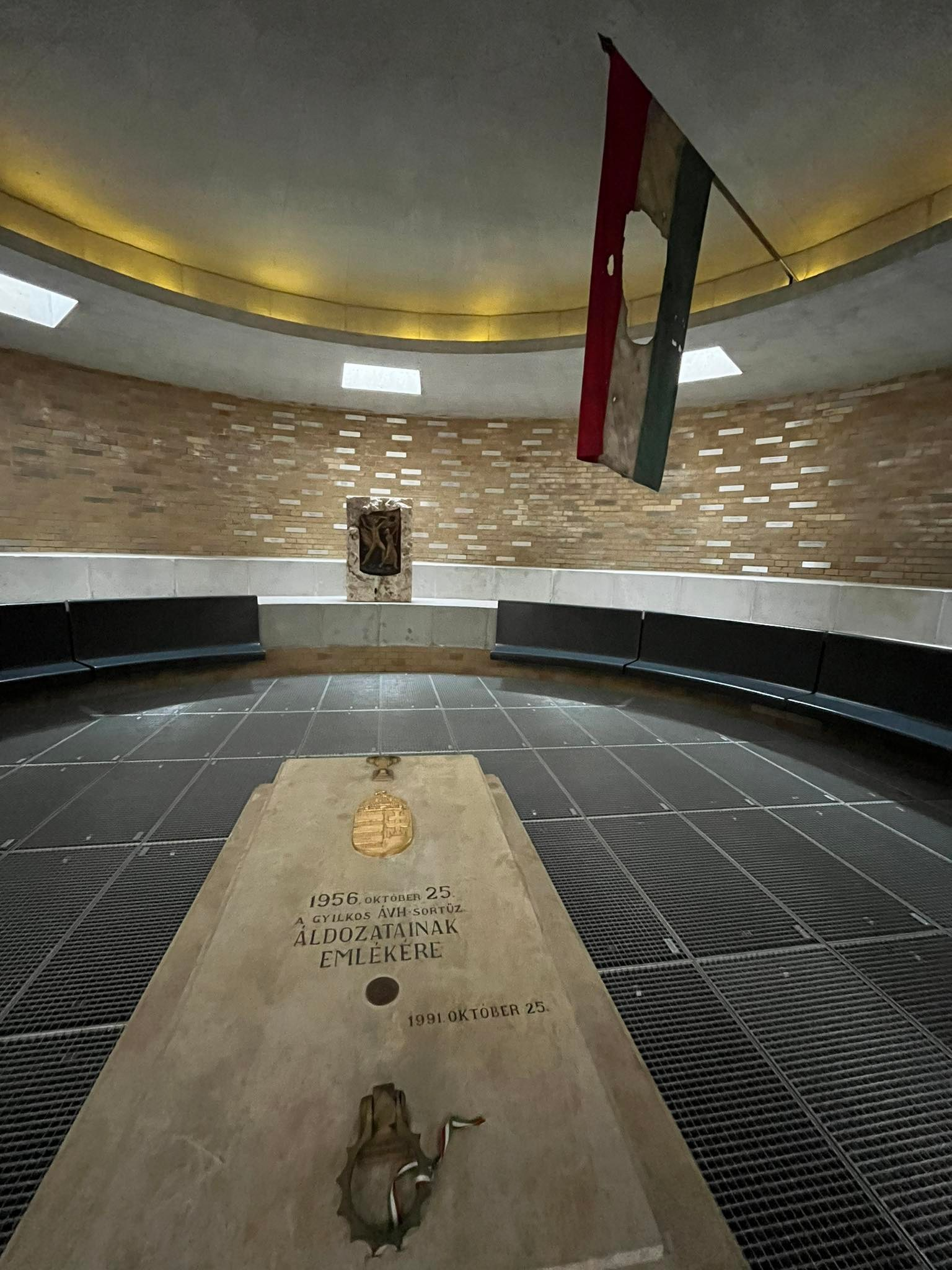
A monument commemorating those who died during the fighting on 25 October 1956

=== Hungary ===
In the immediate aftermath, many thousands of Hungarians were arrested. Eventually, 26,000 of these were brought before the Hungarian courts, 22,000 were sentenced and imprisoned, 13,000 were interned, and 229 were executed. Approximately 200,000 fled Hungary as refugees. Many resettled in Austria in the winter of 1956. These were helped by CARE, an international relief organization. CARE provided refugees with welcome kits consisting of pajamas, knitting tools, school supplies, food, and water. The U.S. Department of Agriculture worked with CARE to use military vessels to transport over 500,000 packages to Vienna, where the Red Cross distributed supplies to refugees. Hungarian refugees of the conflict were resettled across 37 different countries, with most going to Austria. Former Hungarian Foreign Minister Géza Jeszenszky estimated that 350 were executed. Sporadic resistance and strikes by workers' councils continued until mid-1957, causing economic disruption. By 1963, most political prisoners from the 1956 Hungarian Revolution had been released.

With most of Budapest under Soviet control by 8 November, Kádár became Prime Minister of the "Revolutionary Worker-Peasant Government" and General Secretary of the Hungarian Communist Party. Few Hungarians rejoined the reorganised Party, its leadership having been purged under the supervision of the Soviet Praesidium, led by Georgy Malenkov and Mikhail Suslov. Although Party membership declined from 800,000 before the uprising to 100,000 by December 1956, Kádár steadily increased his control over Hungary and neutralised dissenters. The new government attempted to enlist support by espousing popular principles of Hungarian self-determination voiced during the uprising, but Soviet troops remained. After 1956 the Soviet Union severely purged the Hungarian Army and reinstituted political indoctrination in the units that remained. In May 1957, the Soviet Union increased its troop levels in Hungary and by treaty Hungary accepted the Soviet presence on a permanent basis.

The Red Cross and the Austrian Army established refugee camps in Traiskirchen and Graz. Nagy along with György Lukács, Géza Losonczy, and László Rajk's widow, Júlia, took refuge in the Embassy of Yugoslavia as Soviet forces overran Budapest. Despite assurances of safe passage out of Hungary by the Soviets and the Kádár government, Nagy and his group were arrested when attempting to leave the embassy on 22 November and taken to Romania. Losonczy died while on a hunger strike in prison awaiting trial when his jailers "carelessly pushed a feeding tube down his windpipe".

The remainder of the group was returned to Budapest in 1958. Nagy was executed, along with Maléter and Miklós Gimes, after secret trials in June 1958. Their bodies were placed in unmarked graves in the Municipal Cemetery outside Budapest.

During the November 1956 Soviet assault on Budapest, Cardinal Mindszenty was granted political asylum at the United States embassy, where he lived for the next 15 years, refusing to leave Hungary unless the government reversed his 1949 conviction for treason. Because of poor health and a request from the Vatican, he finally left the embassy for Austria in September 1971.

Nicolas Krassó was one of the left leaders of the Hungarian uprising and member of the New Left Review editorial committee. In an interview he gave to Peter Gowan shortly before his death, Krassó summed up the meaning of the Hungarian Revolution with a recollection from Stalin's short speech in the 19th Congress of the Soviet Union in 1952: "Stalin kept silent throughout the Congress till the very end when he made a short speech that covers about two and a half printed pages. He said there were two banners that the progressive bourgeoisie had thrown away and which the working class should pick up – the banners of democracy and national independence. Certainly nobody could doubt that in 1956 the Hungarian workers raised these banners high."

=== International ===
Despite Cold War rhetoric from western countries espousing rollback of the Soviet domination of eastern Europe, and Soviet promises of socialism's imminent triumph, national leaders of this period (as well as later historians) saw the failure of the Hungarian Revolution as evidence that the Cold War had come to a stalemate in Europe.

In West Germany, Foreign Minister Heinrich von Brentano recommended that the people of Eastern Europe be discouraged from "taking dramatic action which might have disastrous consequences for themselves". The Secretary-General of NATO Paul-Henri Spaak called the Hungarian revolt "the collective suicide of a whole people". In a December 1956 meeting of the West German Social-Democratic Party, Central Board member Herbert Wehner condemned what he termed the uprising's "fever of destruction against everybody believed to be members or officials of the Communist Party." In a newspaper interview in 1957, Khrushchev commented, "support by United States ... is rather in the nature of the support that the rope gives to a hanged man".

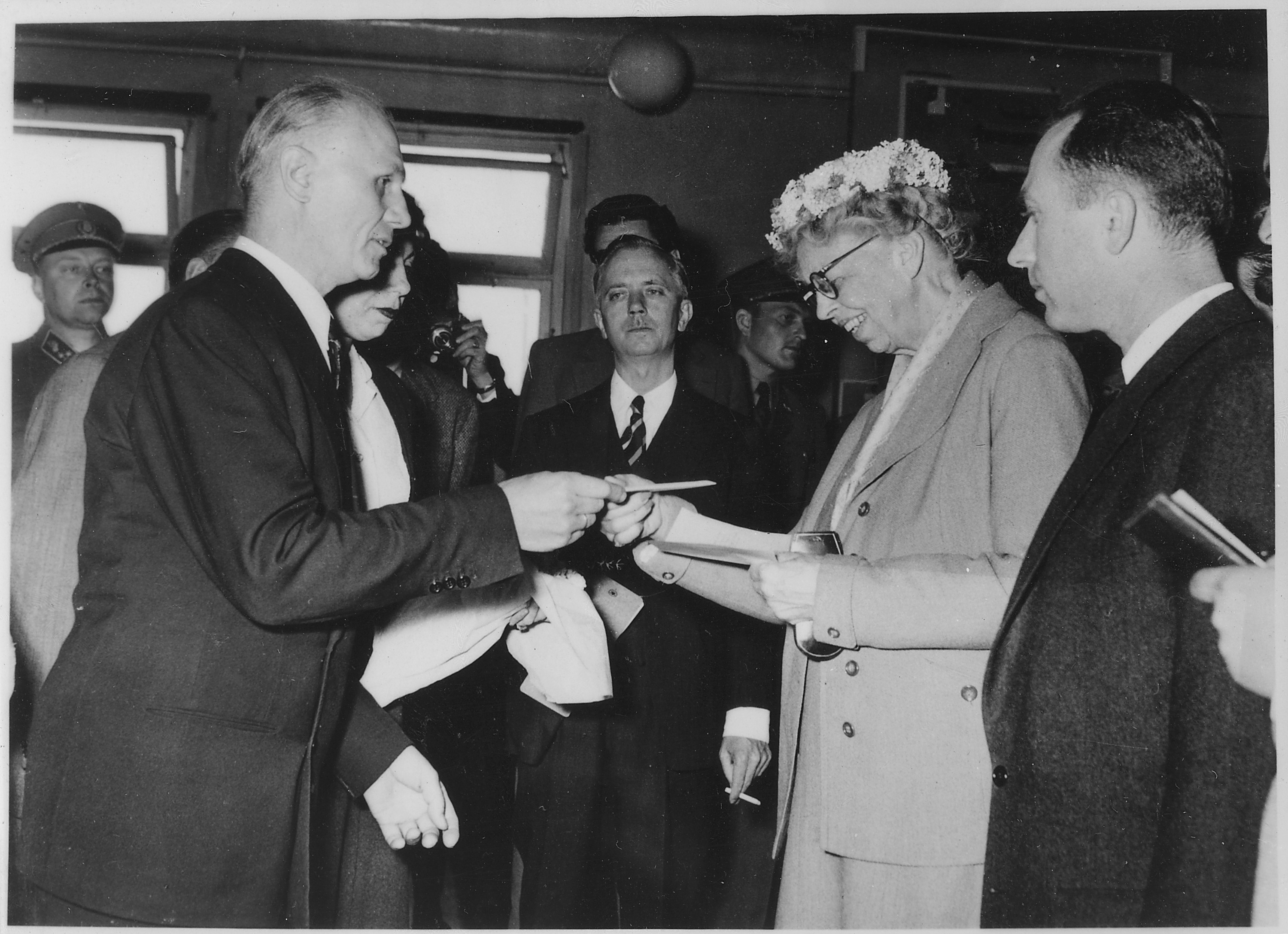
Eleanor Roosevelt meets exiled Hungarian revolutionaries at Camp Roeder in Salzburg, 10 May 1957

In January 1957, United Nations Secretary-General Dag Hammarskjöld, acting in response to UN General Assembly resolutions requesting investigation and observation of the events in Soviet-occupied Hungary, established the Special Committee on the Problem of Hungary. The committee, with representatives from Australia, Ceylon (now Sri Lanka), Denmark, Tunisia and Uruguay, conducted hearings in New York, Geneva, Rome, Vienna and London. Over five months, 111 refugees were interviewed including ministers, military commanders and other officials of the Nagy government, workers, revolutionary council members, factory managers and technicians, communists and non-communists, students, writers, teachers, medical personnel, and Hungarian soldiers. Documents, newspapers, radio transcripts, photos, film footage, and other records from Hungary were also reviewed, as well as written testimony of 200 other Hungarians.

The governments of Hungary and Romania refused entry to the officials of this committee, and the government of the Soviet Union did not respond to requests for information. The 268-page Committee Report was presented to the General Assembly in June 1957, documenting the course of the uprising and Soviet intervention and concluding that "the Kádár government and Soviet occupation were in violation of the human rights of the Hungarian people". A General Assembly resolution was approved, deploring "the repression of the Hungarian people and the Soviet occupation", but no other action was taken.

The chairman of the Special Committee was Alsing Andersen, a Danish politician and leading figure of Denmark's Social Democratic Party, who had served in the Buhl government in 1942 during the Nazi German occupation of Denmark. He had defended collaboration with the occupation forces and denounced the resistance. The Committee Report and the motives of its authors were criticised by the delegations to the United Nations from the Soviet Union and Kádár government. The Hungarian representative disagreed with the report's conclusions, accusing it of falsifying the events, and argued that the establishment of the committee was illegal. The committee was accused of being hostile to Hungary and its social system. An article in the Soviet journal International Affairs, published by the Foreign Affairs Ministry, carried an article in 1957 in which it denounced the report as a "collection of falsehoods and distortions".

Time named the Hungarian Freedom Fighter its Man of the Year for 1956. The accompanying Time article comments that this choice could not have been anticipated until the explosive events of the revolution, almost at the end of 1956. The magazine cover and accompanying text displayed an artist's depiction of a Hungarian freedom fighter, and used pseudonyms for the three participants whose stories are the subject of the article. In 2006, Hungarian Prime Minister Ferenc Gyurcsány referred to this famous Time cover as "the faces of free Hungary" in a speech marking the 50th anniversary of the uprising. Mr Gyurcsány (in a joint appearance with British Prime Minister Tony Blair) commented "It is an idealised image but the faces of the figures are really the face of the revolutionaries".

At the 1956 Summer Olympics in Melbourne, the Soviet handling of the Hungarian uprising led to a boycott by Spain, the Netherlands, and Switzerland. A confrontation between Soviet and Hungarian teams occurred in the semi-final match of the water polo tournament on 6 December. The match was extremely violent, and was halted in the final minute to quell fighting among spectators. This match, now known as the "Blood in the Water match", became the subject of several films. The Hungarian team won the game 4–0 and later was awarded the Olympic gold medal. Norway declined an invitation to the inaugural Bandy World Championship in 1957, citing the presence of a team from the Soviet Union as the reason.

On Sunday, January 6, 1957, as millions of Americans watched Ed Sullivan's popular television variety show, with the 21-year-old Elvis Presley headlining for the third time, Sullivan told viewers Presley felt "so keenly about Hungarian relief, he urges all of us through the country to remember that immediate aid is needed." The host followed this with Presley singing an unrecorded number, the gospel song Peace in the Valley, saying "he feels that this is sort of in the mood that he'd like to create." By the end of 1957, these contributions, distributed by the Geneva-based International Red Cross as food rations, clothing and other essentials, had amounted to some CHF 26 million (US$6 million in 1957 dollars), the equivalent of $68,800,000 in today's dollars. On 1 March 2011, István Tarlós, the mayor of Budapest, made Presley an honorary citizen posthumously, and a plaza located at the intersection of two of the city's most important avenues was named after Presley as a gesture of gratitude.

Meanwhile, as the 1950s drew to a close the events in Hungary produced fractures within the Communist political parties of Western European countries. In San Marino, some moderate Socialist members of a Socialist-Communist coalition government broke their alliance with the Communists, who failed to condemn the Soviet Union's repression of the Hungarians. This schism resulted in a perfect 30–30 split in the council that paralyzed the government and led to the fatti di Rovereta, a constitutional crisis which resulted in the victory of a new democratic government and brought the twelve years of communist rule in San Marino to an end. The Italian Communist Party (PCI) suffered a split. According to the official newspaper of the PCI, l'Unità, most ordinary members and the Party leadership, including Palmiro Togliatti and Giorgio Napolitano, supported the actions of the Soviet Union in suppressing the uprising. However, Giuseppe Di Vittorio, chief of the communist trade union CGIL, spoke out against the leadership's position, as did prominent party members Antonio Giolitti, Loris Fortuna, and many others influential in the Communist Party. Pietro Nenni of the Italian Socialist Party, a close ally of the PCI, opposed the Soviet intervention as well. Napolitano, elected in 2006 as President of the Italian Republic, wrote in his 2005 political autobiography that he regretted his justification of Soviet action in Hungary, stating at the time he believed that party unity and the leadership of Soviet Communism was more important.

The Communist Party of Great Britain (CPGB) suffered the loss of thousands of party members following the events in Hungary. Though Peter Fryer, correspondent for the CPGB newspaper The Daily Worker, reported on the violent suppression of the uprising, his dispatches were heavily censored by the party leadership. Fryer subsequently resigned from the newspaper. He was expelled by the Communist Party.

In France, moderate communists, such as historian Emmanuel Le Roy Ladurie, resigned, questioning the French Communist Party's policy of supporting Soviet actions. The French philosopher and writer Albert Camus wrote an open letter, The Blood of the Hungarians, criticising the West's lack of action. Jean-Paul Sartre, still a determined Communist, criticised the Soviets in his article Le Fantôme de Staline, in Situations VII.

In the People's Republic of China, the uprising and its suppression prompted debated within the CCP and among non-institutional actors like students and cultural workers. The CCP viewed the events of the revolution in context of its concern with the Soviet de-Stalinization of 1956 and the sort of problems along the lines of the Eastern European uprisings that China might eventually have to face. Some Chinese leaders viewed the events, together with the protests in Poland, as demonstrating the dangers of overemphasizing development of heavy industry while underemphasizing people's livelihoods. A group that included Liu Shaoqi, major figures in the press, and the membership of the democratic parties, contended that the three risks of "subjectivism, sectarianism, and bureaucratism" should be opposed through a process of "Big Democracy" that increased the people's participation in party-state institutions. Mao expressed a view of "Big Democracy" in which the people would check institutions not through being incorporated into them, but through acting against them through popular protest, strikes, and agitation. Mao cited the repressions in Hungary as a lesson: "You forbid people to strike, to petition, or to make unfavorable comments, you simply resort to repression in every case, until one day you become a Rákosi." Later, as the CCP leadership became concerned with the degree of criticism from the lower levels of the party and from outside of the party during the Hundred Flowers campaign, Mao again cited the Hungarian revolution, describing China as at risk of a "Hungarian Incident" if it did not win this "major battle".

The Kuomintang (KMT) UN representative of Taipei-based Republic of China Tsiang Tingfu condemned Soviet actions in Hungary following the crackdown while the Chinese government collected contributions towards the relief of Hungarian refugees.

=== Commemoration and legacy ===
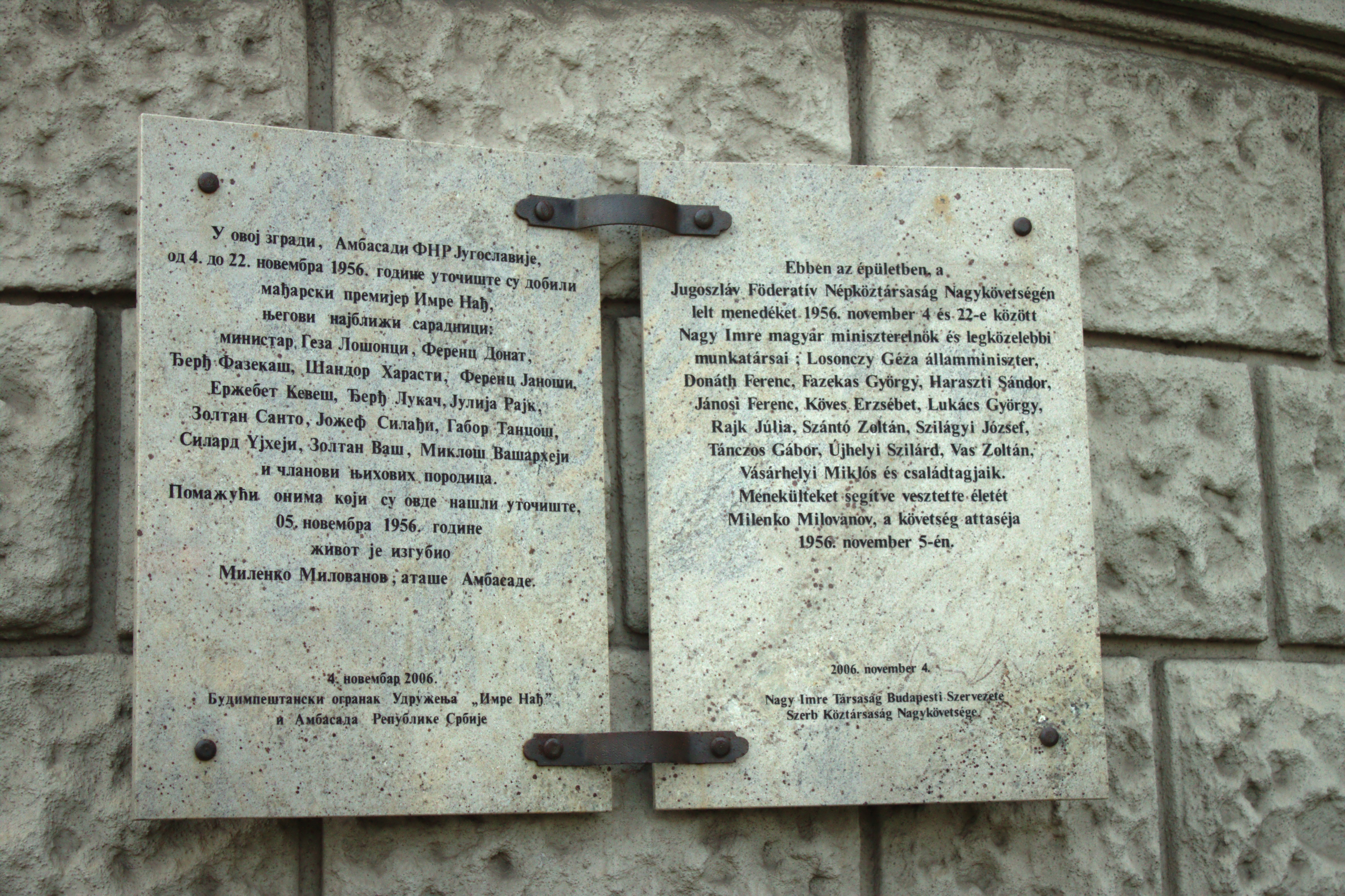
Memorial plaque at the Embassy of Serbia, Budapest in memory of Imre Nagy, who took sanctuary in what was the Yugoslav embassy during the Hungarian Revolution.

In the north-west corner of MacArthur Park in Los Angeles, California, the Hungarian-American community built a commemorative statue to honour the Hungarian freedom fighters. Built in the late 1960s, the obelisk statue stands with an American eagle watching over the city of Los Angeles. There are several monuments dedicated to the Commemoration of the Hungarian Revolution throughout the United States. One such monument may be found in Cleveland, Ohio, at the Cardinal Mindszenty Plaza. There is also a monument of "A Boy From Pest" in the town of Szczecin, Poland. Denver has Hungarian Freedom Park, named in 1968 to commemorate the uprising.

Public discussion about the revolution was suppressed in Hungary for more than 30 years. Since the thaw of the 1980s, it has been a subject of intense study and debate. At the inauguration of the Third Hungarian Republic in 1989, 23 October was declared a national holiday.

On 16 June 1989, at the 31st commemoration of his execution, Nagy's body was reburied with full honours. The Republic of Hungary was declared in 1989 on the 33rd anniversary of the Revolution, and 23 October is now a Hungarian national holiday.

In December 1991, the preamble of the treaties signed with the dismembered Soviet Union, under Mikhail Gorbachev, and Russia, represented by Boris Yeltsin, officially apologised for the Soviet actions of 1956 in Hungary. Yeltsin made the apology in person during a 1992 speech to the Hungarian Parliament.

In 2000, the Hungarian government passed "Ilona Tóth's law", absolving those that were convicted for their involvement with the revolution, inspired by the case of Ilona Tóth.

On 13 February 2006, the U.S. State Department commemorated the fiftieth anniversary of the 1956 Hungarian Revolution. U.S. Secretary of State Condoleezza Rice commented on the contributions made by 1956 Hungarian refugees to the United States and other host countries, as well as the role of Hungary in providing refuge to East Germans during the 1989 protests against communist rule. U.S. President George W. Bush also visited Hungary on 22 June 2006 to commemorate the fiftieth anniversary.

In August 2023, a history textbook written by former Minister of Culture of Russia Vladimir Medinsky, claimed that the 1956 Hungarian Revolution was a fascist uprising organised by the West. On 25 September 2023, Hungary's Minister of Foreign Affairs and Trade Péter Szijjártó said "labelling these people as fascists is simply unacceptable".

== See also ==
- 1956 Georgian demonstrations
- Anti-Rightist Campaign
- "Avanti ragazzi di Buda", an Italian song about the 1956 Hungarian Revolution
- Cultural representations of the Hungarian Revolution of 1956
  - Children of Glory (2006)
  - House of Terror museum in Budapest
- East German uprising of 1953
- Foreign interventions by the Soviet Union
- List of conflicts related to the Cold War
- Poznań protests of 1956
- Prague Spring (1968)
- Quỳnh Lưu uprising (1956)
- Romanian anti-communist resistance movement
- Significant events of the Hungarian Revolution of 1956
  - "Blood in the Water" match at the 1956 Summer Olympics
- Tankie
