= Ignaz Wechselmann =

Hungarian architect (1828–1903)

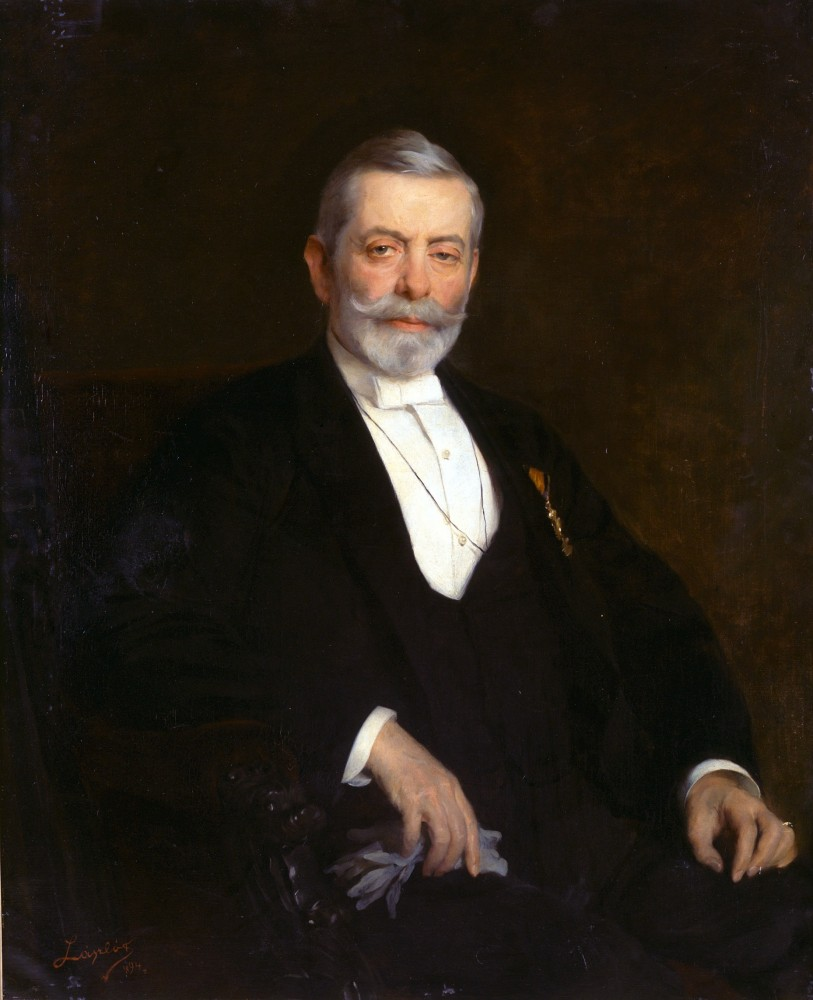
- Ignaz Wechselmann, 1894 painted by Philip de László
- Born: Ignaz Wechselmann; 1 January 1828; Nikolai, Province of Silesia, Prussia
- Died: 17 January 1903 (aged 75); Budapest, Austria-Hungary
- Education: TU Wien, Vienna; TU Berlin, Berlin
- Occupation: Architect
- Practice: Ludwig Förster
- Buildings: Dohány Street Synagogue

Ignaz Wechselmann (1828 in Nikolai, Prussian Silesia – January 17, 1903 in Budapest) was a Hungarian architect and philanthropist.

== Biography ==
Educated in Berlin, Wechselmann moved to Vienna, where he became the friend and assistant of the architect Ludwig Förster. In 1856 he moved to Budapest, where he, as Förster's representative, superintended the building of the Dohány Street Synagogue. Most of the monumental buildings erected in the Hungarian capital between 1870 and 1890 were designed by him, his work including palaces, mills, factories, churches, and the famous Burg-Bazar. In 1886, he received the Order of the Iron Crown of the third class, and shortly afterward Francis Joseph I. elevated him to the Hungarian nobility.

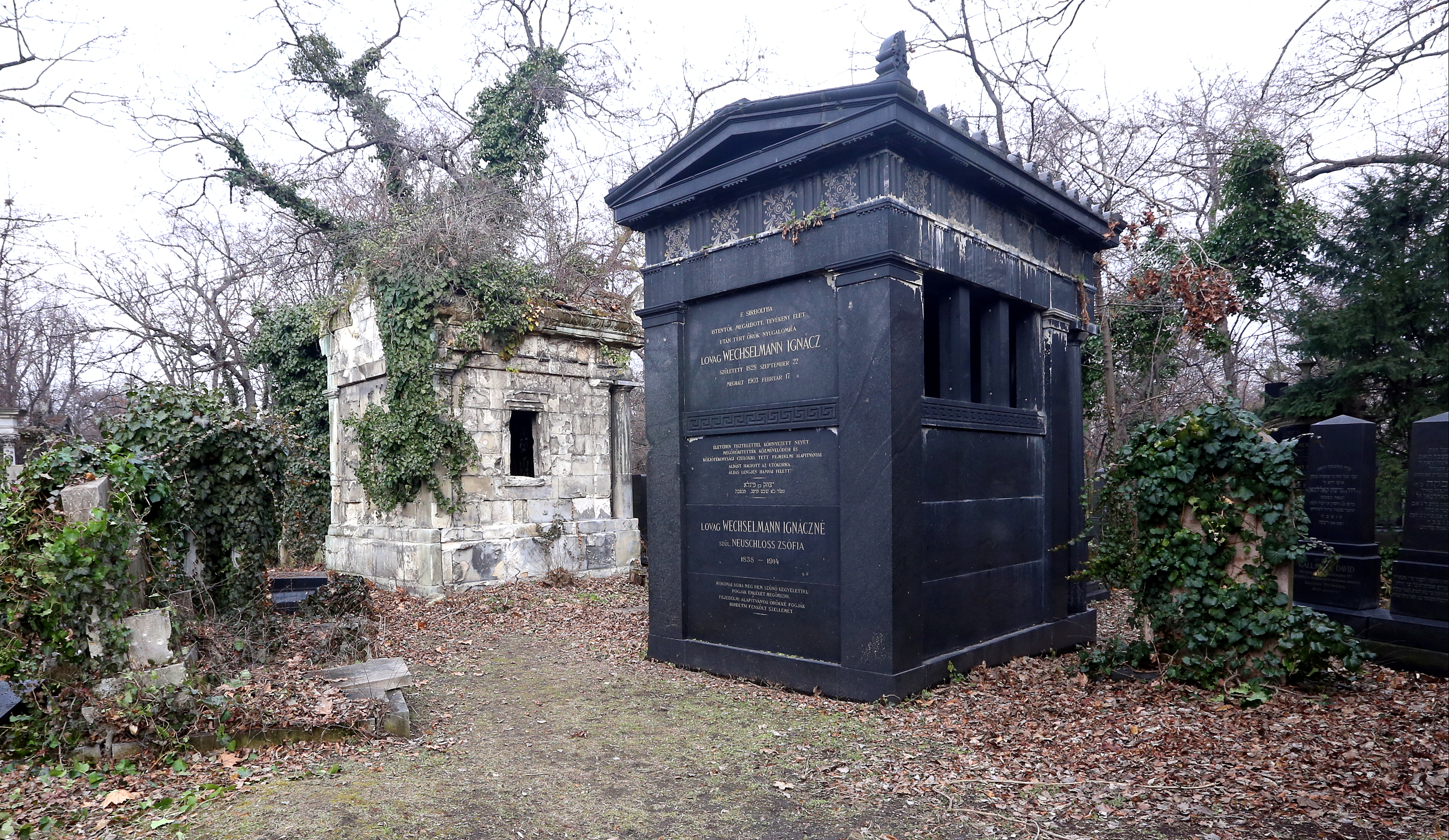
Tomb of Ignaz Wechselmann in Budapest at the Salgotarjani Street Jewish Cemetery

Failing eyesight compelled Wechselmann to retire from active life in 1890, whereupon he devoted his time to philanthropic activity in Budapest. His greatest act of charity was embodied in two clauses in his will, by which he bequeathed one million kronen to the Institute for the Blind, and two millions for the support of meritorious teachers in the public schools. Half of these beneficiaries were to be Jews and the other half Christians; and the board of directors of the Jewish community was entrusted with the administration of the bequests.
