= Raoul Wallenberg Holocaust Memorial Park =

Memorial in Budapest

Coordinates: 47.49644°N 19.06113°E

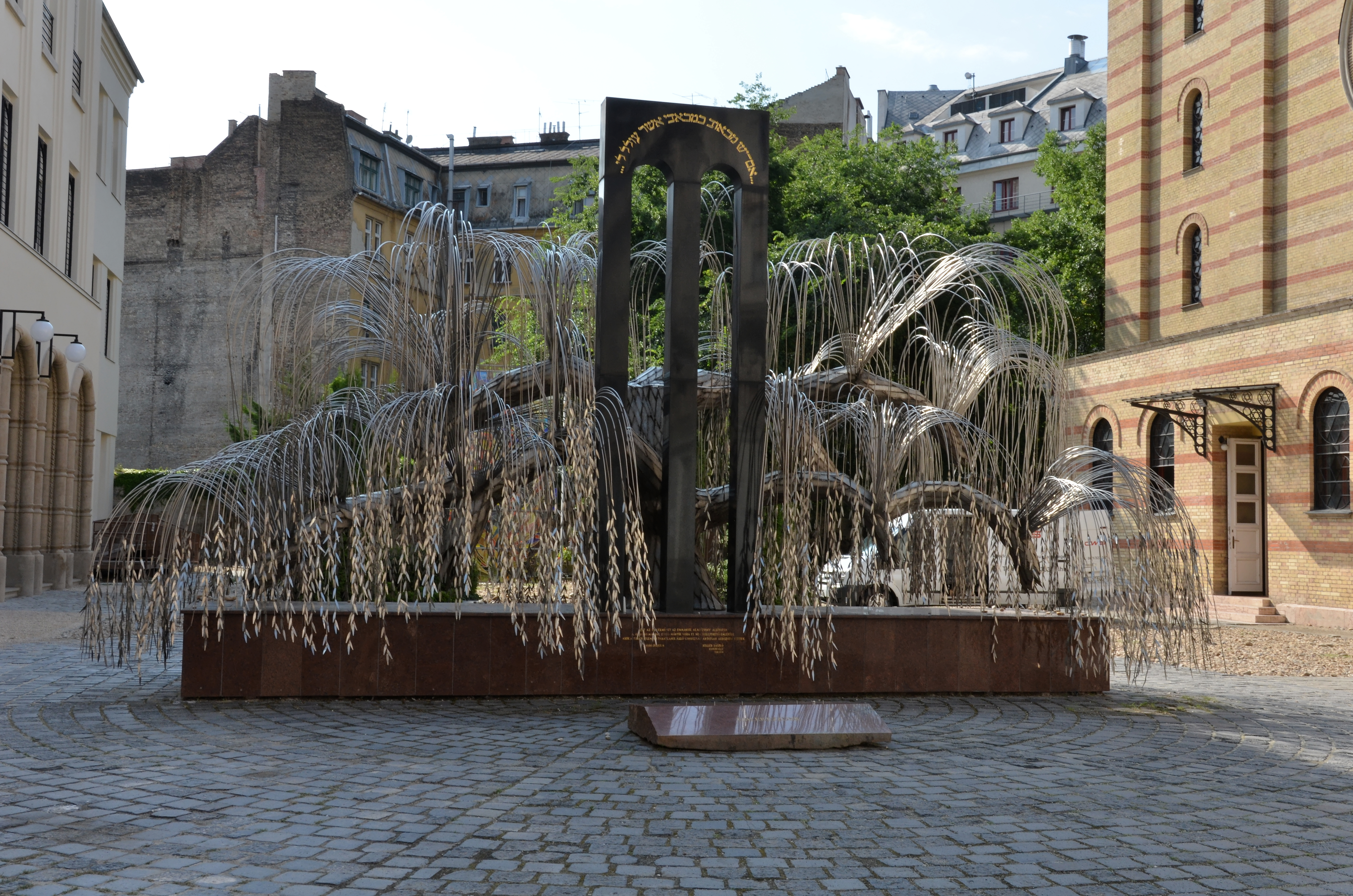
Imre Varga's willow sculpture

The Raoul Wallenberg Emlékpark (memory park) in the rear courtyard of the Dohány Street Synagogue holds the Memorial of the Hungarian Jewish Martyrs — at least 400,000 Hungarian Jews were murdered by the Nazis. Made by Imre Varga, it resembles a weeping willow whose leaves bear inscriptions with the names of victims. There is also a memorial to Wallenberg and other Righteous Among the Nations, among them: Swiss Vice-consul Carl Lutz; Ángel Sanz Briz, the Spanish Ambassador in Hungary; Giorgio Perlasca, an Italian man who, with a strategic escamotage, declared himself the Spanish consul, releasing documents of protection and current passports to Jews in Budapest without distinction (he saved five thousand); Mons. Angelo Rotta, an Italian Prelate Bishop and Apostolic Nuncio of the State of Vatican City in Budapest, which issued protective sheets, misrepresentations of baptism (to save them from forced labor) and Vatican passports to Jews, without distinction of any kind present in Budapest (saving fifteen thousand), who saved, with his secretary Mons. Gennaro Verolino tens of thousands of Hungarian Jews during World War II.
