= Dohány utca =

Coordinates: 47.4977°N 19.0686°E

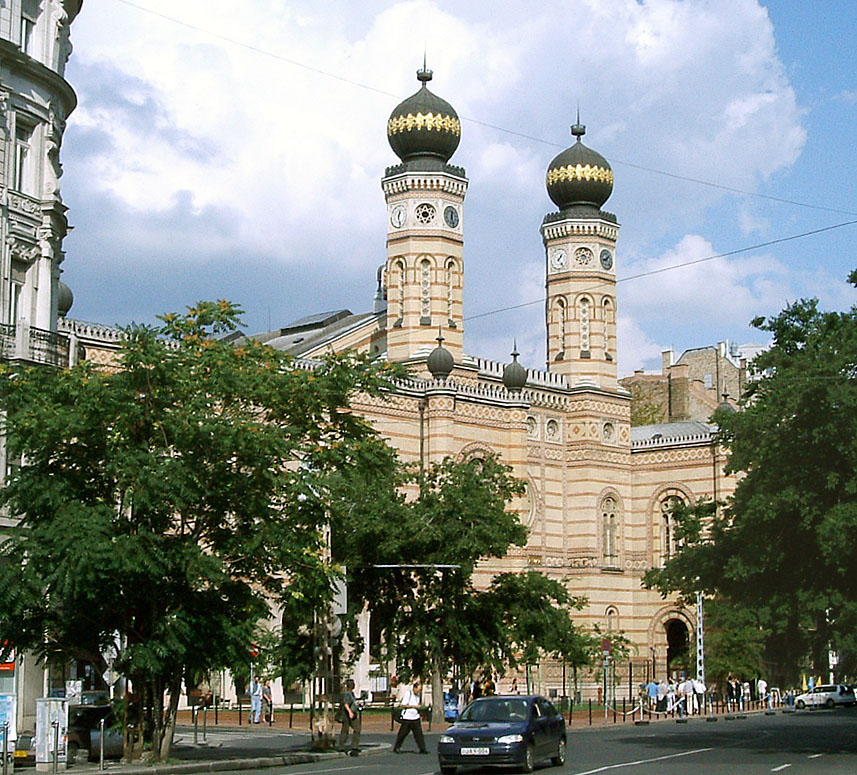
The Dohány Street Synagogue is often considered the most prominent building on Dohány utca.

Dohány utca (Hungarian pronunciation: [ˈdoɦaːɲ ˈut͡sːɒ], Tobacco Street) is a street in the Erzsébetváros (Elizabeth City), the 7th district of Budapest, Hungary. It runs between Karoly kórüt and Rottenbiller utca, roughly parallel to Rákóczi út and Wesselenyi utca, and is about 1.6 km (0.99 mi) in length. It contains many of Budapest's significant buildings along its length, including the famed Dohány Street Synagogue at its western end.

== History ==
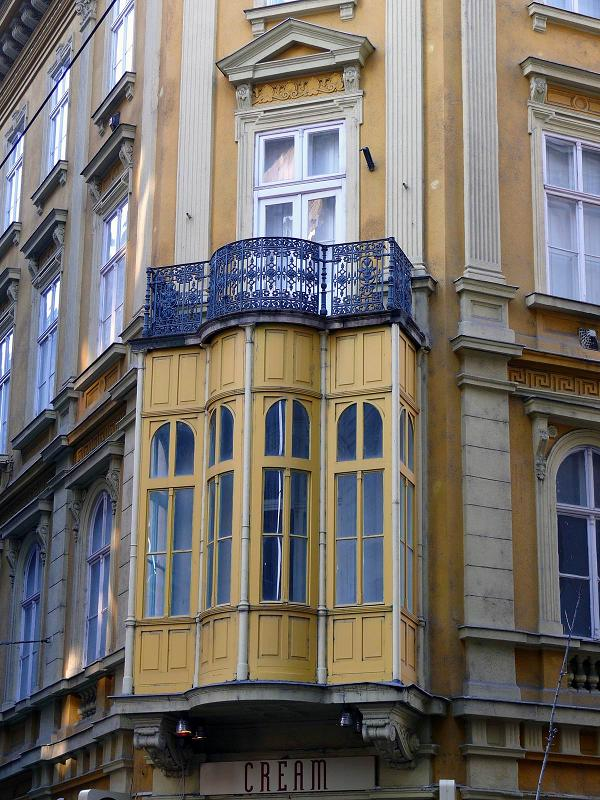
Residential house at 28 Dohány utca, formerly the home of politician Kálmán Mikszáth.

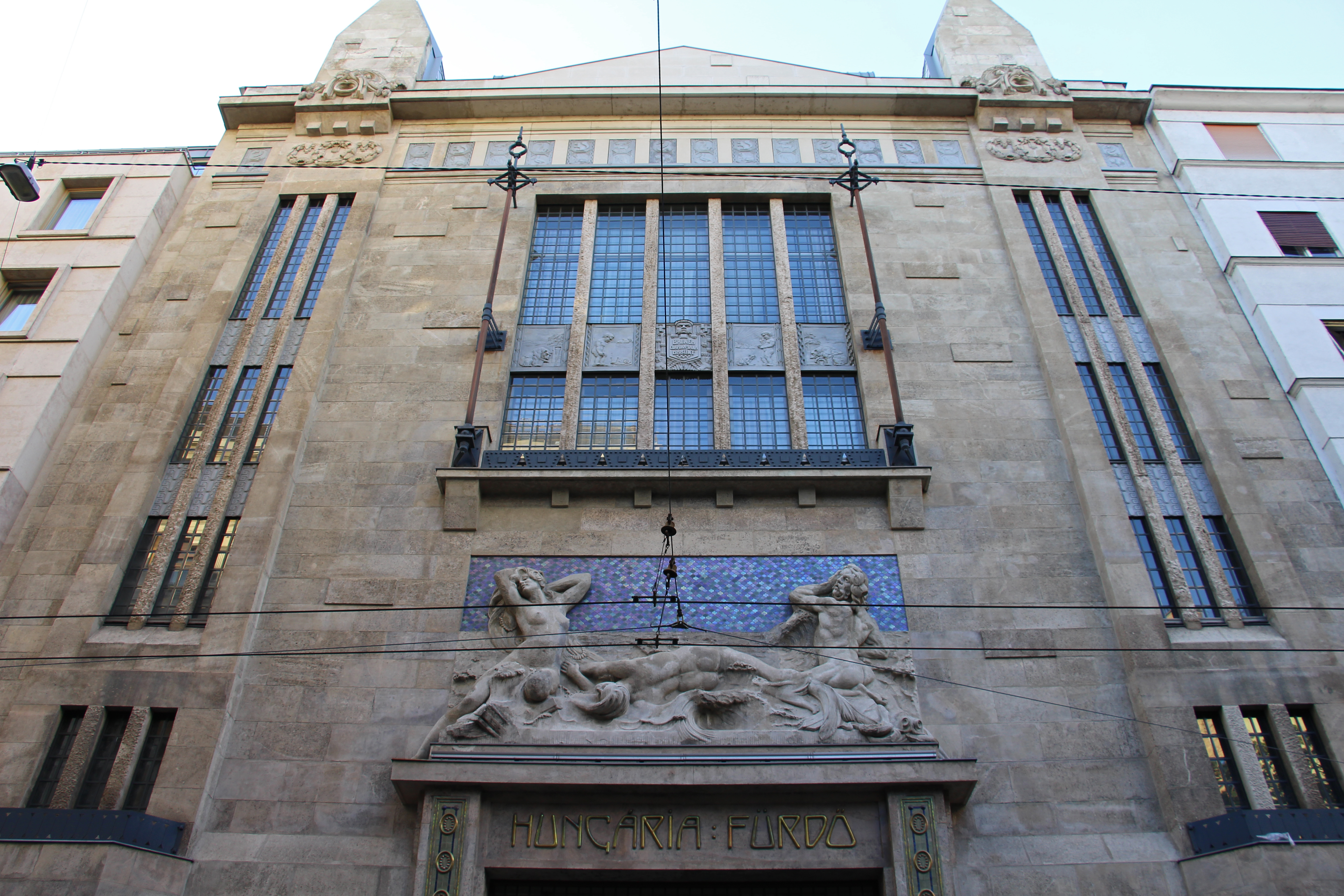
Detail of the facade of the Hungária Baths, now the Continental Hotel Zara.

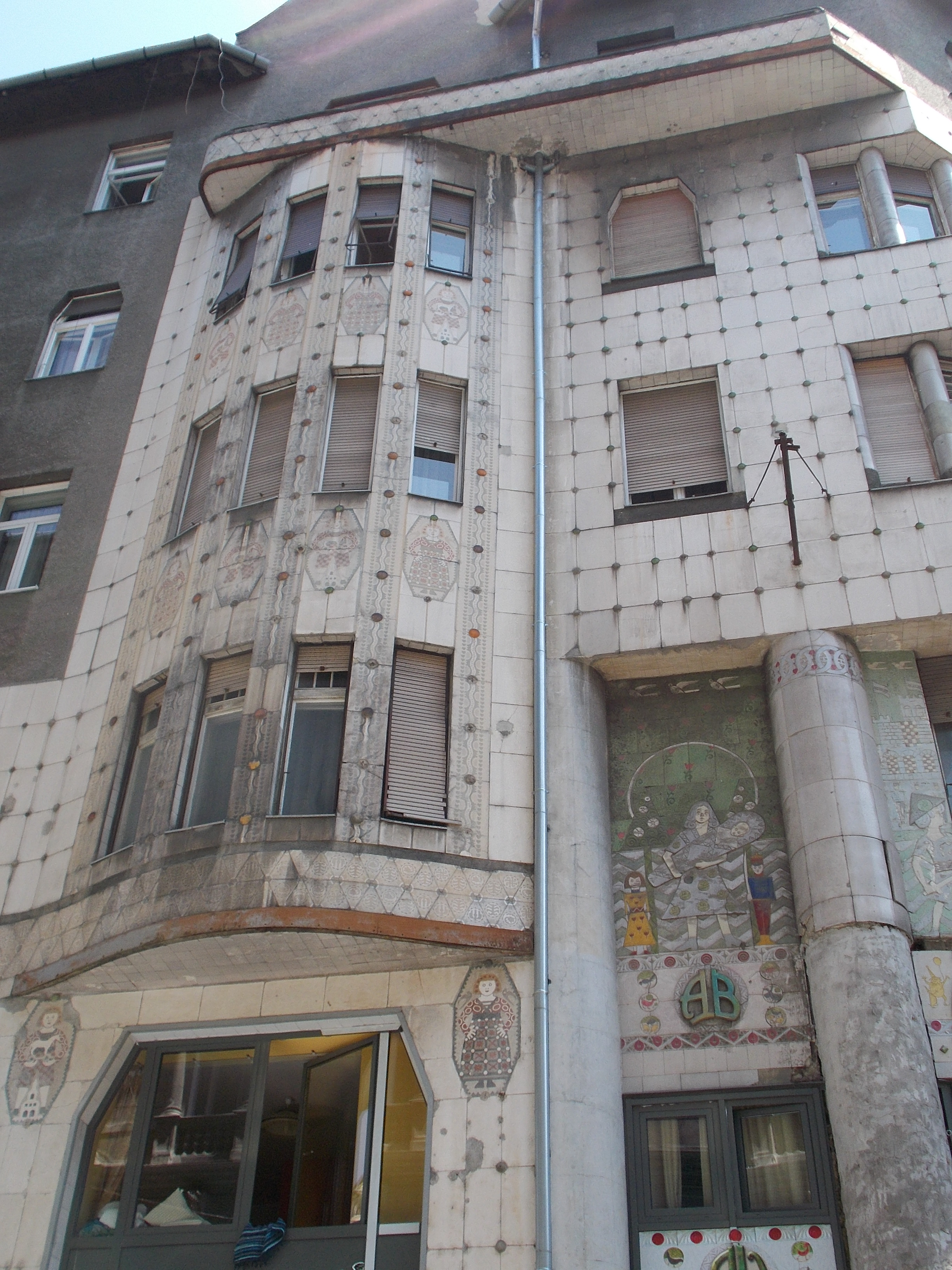
Former Arcade Market at 22–24 Dohány utca.

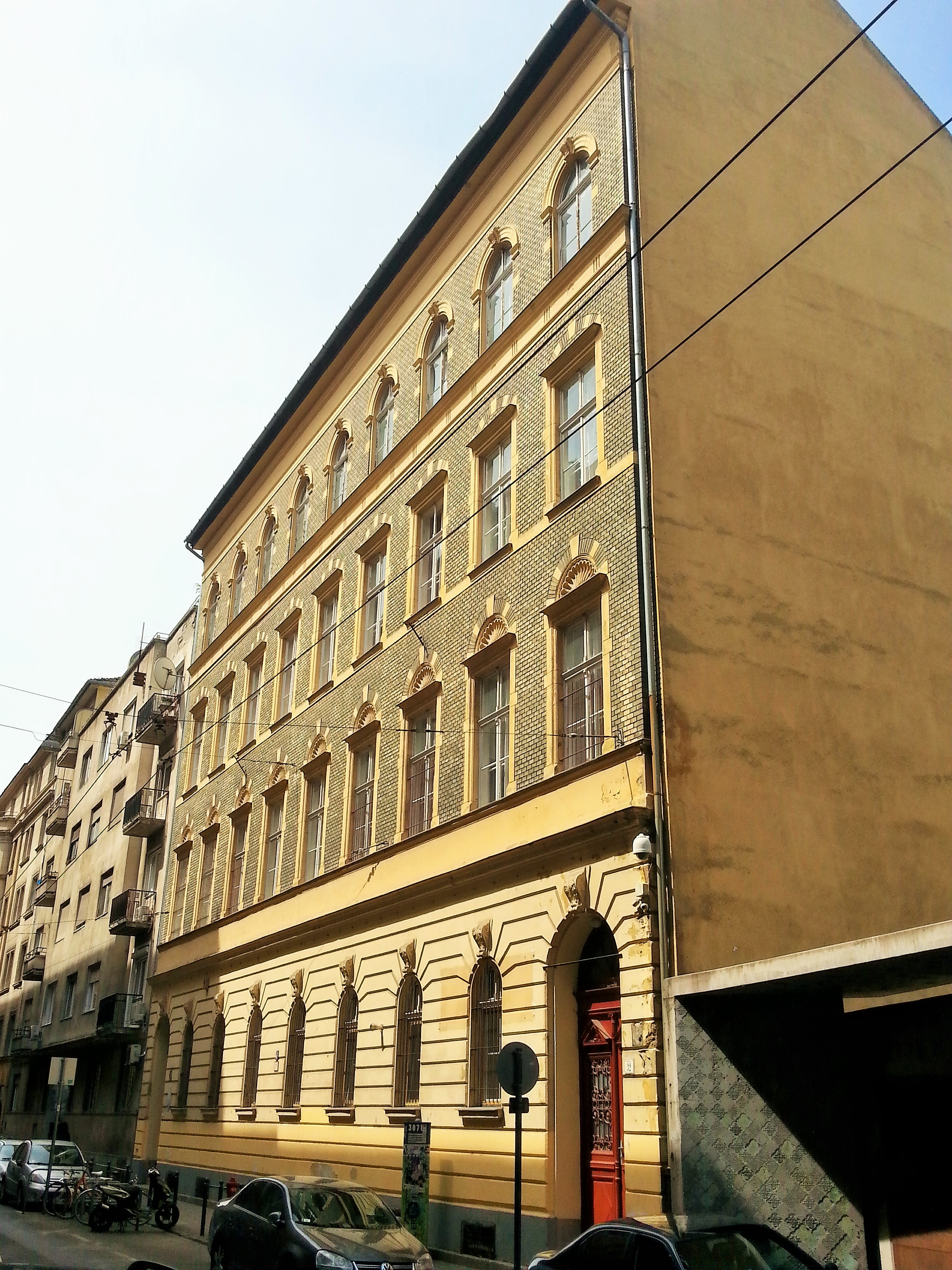
Bét Menachem Hebrew-Hungarian Bilingual Primary School at 32 Dohány utca.

Only a 300-meter-long section of Dohány Street was first opened in 1802 between today's Síp utca and Kazinczy utca. It was first named after the popular and well-known snuff and tobacco maker Anton Prinder, who originally worked in house 211 on Tabakmacher Gasse (Tobacco Maker Street), but then moved after 1804 into the section between Síp utca and Károly kórüt, often called the Seiten Landstrasse (in German, "Side Highway"). In 1817, this became permanently Tabakgasse, and translated in 1850 to Hungarian, the current Dohány utca. The route of Dohány utca as it exists today was built in the 1820s all the way to the later Rottenbiller utca. The new section built at that time was named Felbergasse (Fűzfa utca from 1850) and was only called Dohány utca as its full present length in 1874.

Since Dohány utca was created, it has served as a significant transport route, the main carriageway connecting the city of Pest with the eastern parts of the country, the relief section of the Hatvani (today Rákóczi) út. As a result, several hostels and restaurants were opened on Dohány utca, such as the hostel called Arany Szita for the Rose of Déryné Széppataki during the flood of Pest in 1838. During the second half of the nineteenth century, a large number of Jews moved here, and in 1859 the first significant synagogue of Pest Jewry was inaugurated at the beginning of the street, now the Dohány Street Synagogue. At the end of the Second World War, the border of the Budapest Ghetto was located here.

== Notable buildings ==
(From west to east)

- Dohány utca 3: Residential house (architects Lipót Kauser and Lajos Frey, 1868)
- Dohány utca 6-8: Dohány Street Synagogue (Ludwig Förster, 1859). This monumental building became the largest Jewish house of worship of the period in the world, and later served as the model for the Central Synagogue in Manhattan, New York City (United States). On the plot behind it, the Church of the Heroes commemorating the Jewish dead of the First World War was built in 1931 (based on the plans of László Vágó and Ferenc Faragó), and the Raoul Wallenberg Memorial Garden was established here in the 1990s.
- Dohány utca 10: Palmberger House (József Hild, neoclassical, 1844)
- Dohány utca 12–14: The building of the former Tolnai Printing House, today a significantly renovated office building. The printing house founded by Simon Tolnai operated in the house built in 1913 according to the plans of Dávid and Zsigmond Jónás, where, among other things, the global newspaper Tolna was printed. From 1950 to the 1990s, the University Press operated in the building.
- Dohány utca 16–18: Residential house (Dezső Hültl, Eclectic historicist, 1904). In 1847–48 the poet and revolutionary Sándor Petőfi lived in the upstairs apartment of the Schiller House that was previously located on this site.
- Dohány utca 20: Jáhn House (Eclectic, 1893)
- Dohány utca 22–24: Former Árkád bazaar, today a residential house (László and József Vágó, Art Nouveau, 1909). It was built as the capital's toy store under the name of Arcade Bazaar, so the marble cladding of the building contains imagery of children's toys and animal figures. The figures of the scene were made of Zsolnay ceramics. After the toy store closed, Egressy and then the Metro Club operated in the building.
- Dohány utca 28: Residential house (József Pán, Eclectic historicist, 1872). Between 1886 and 1890, Kálmán Mikszáth and his family lived in this house during his term as a representative in the Hungarian parliament.
- Dohány utca 32: Bét Menachem Hebrew-Hungarian Bilingual Primary School, Kindergarten, and Nursery.
- Dohány utca 36: House of Daniel (József Höfler, Eclectic historicist, 1891). At the beginning of the 20th century, the building housed the elegant Marilla Café.
- Dohány utca 37: Residential building (Gyula Bíró, Szecesszió, 1910)
- Dohány utca 39: Csáki House (Gothic Revival, 1899)
- Dohány utca 40: Dwelling house (Eclectic historicist, 1874). In the interwar period, the Cluj-Napoca Café was located here.
- Dohány utca 42: Formerly the Continental hostel (Imre Novák, 1890), but today a paid parking lot. Until 1970, the Continental as a hotel that was rebuilt several times.
- Dohány utca 44: Former Hungária Baths (Emil Ágoston, Szecesszió, 1910), now the Continental Hotel Zara. In the early nineteenth century, a sources of cold, medicinal water was discovered here, and as early as 1827, the first bathhouse, a Hungarian proclivity, was built. The Ágoston building boasted one of the most remarkable facades of the Hungarian Szecesszió style (Art Nouveau). The spa closed in the 1920s, but a cinema and theater operated on the ground floor until 1963, and evening literary readings were held in the basement. After years of languishing in poor condition, in 2009, after years of neglect, ZeinaHotel Ltd undertook a 50-million-Euro construction project to rehabilitate it to the current modern hotel.
- Dohány utca 46: Residential house (László Vágó, Art Deco, 1929)
- Dohány utca 58–62: Residential house (Károly Rainer, Szecesszió, 1914)
- Dohány utca 59: Residential house (Artúr Mellinger, Szecesszió, 1907)
- Dohány utca 63: Residential house (Eclectic, 1885). As a child, Milán Füst lived here with his mother, soon after the building was constructed.
- Dohány utca 68: Snow House (Eclectic, 1893)
- Dohány utca 71: Dwelling house (Szecesszió, 1900)
- Dohány utca 76: Former Home Circle, today the headquarters of the National Gypsy Self-Government (Géza Márkus, Eclectic, 1898)
