= Continental Hotel Budapest =

Hotel in Budapest, Hungary

Coordinates: 47°29′48″N 19°4′0″E

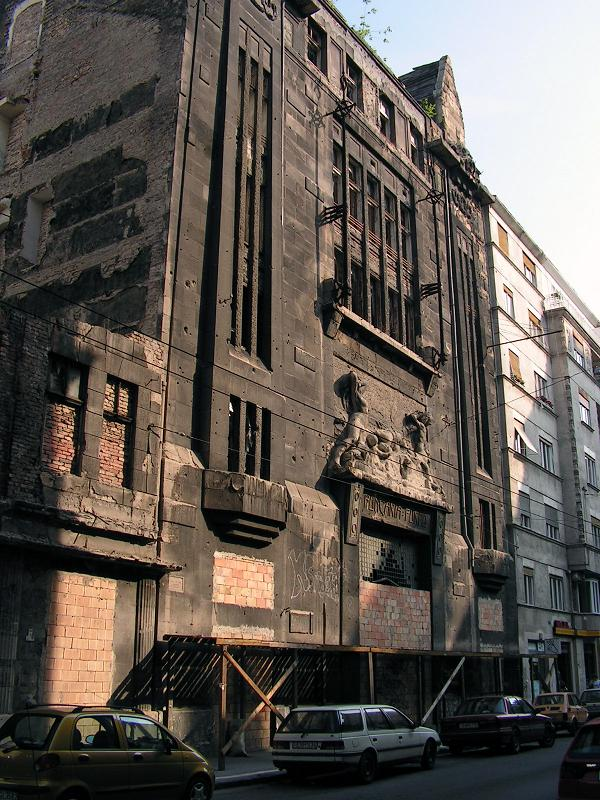
The building of the Hungária Bath in Budapest

The Continental Hotel is a hotel in Budapest, Hungary. The hotel is located on the corner of Nyár and Dohány streets, near the old Jewish quarter and the Klauzál Square Market Hall.

== History ==
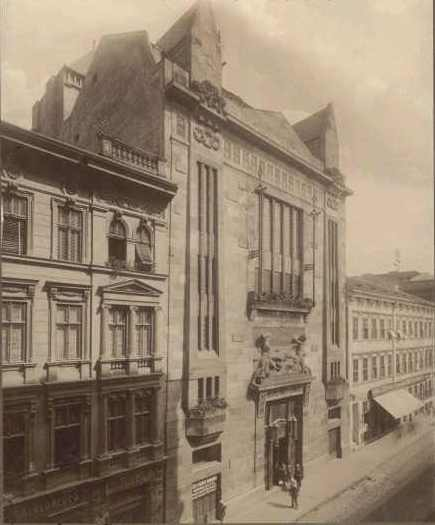
Building of the former Hungaria Bath in the early 20th century

The history of Continental Hotel dates back to the early 20th century, when the first baths were built on site in 1827, then washed away in the Great Flood of 1838, but the building, which still remains standing, dates back to 1910. The current premises of the hotel used to be home to the former Hungaria Bath, one of the most important spas in Pest and later to those in Budapest, and to the contemporary Continental Hotel, which was opened in the Nyár utca wing. In 1970, Continental Hotel closed its doors and during the 1980s the building which served as a hotel and spa for many years in the past, became in a perilous state. Then after many years of negotiations and controversies about demolishing the building, in the summer of 2004, the National Office of Cultural Heritage ordered the interim protection of buildings at risk in the area of the former Pest Jewish ghetto, including the Hungária Bath. On February 7, 2005 the remaining section of the spa was declared a listed building. Finally, on April 7, 2009, after years of neglect, ZeinaHotel Ltd promoted a 50 million Euro construction project to revive the accommodation.

== Location ==
Continental Hotel is located in the heart of Budapest, near the junction of Nagykörút (Grand Boulevard) and Rákóczi út.
