= Miskolc Synagogue =

Orthodox synagogue in Miskolc, Hungary

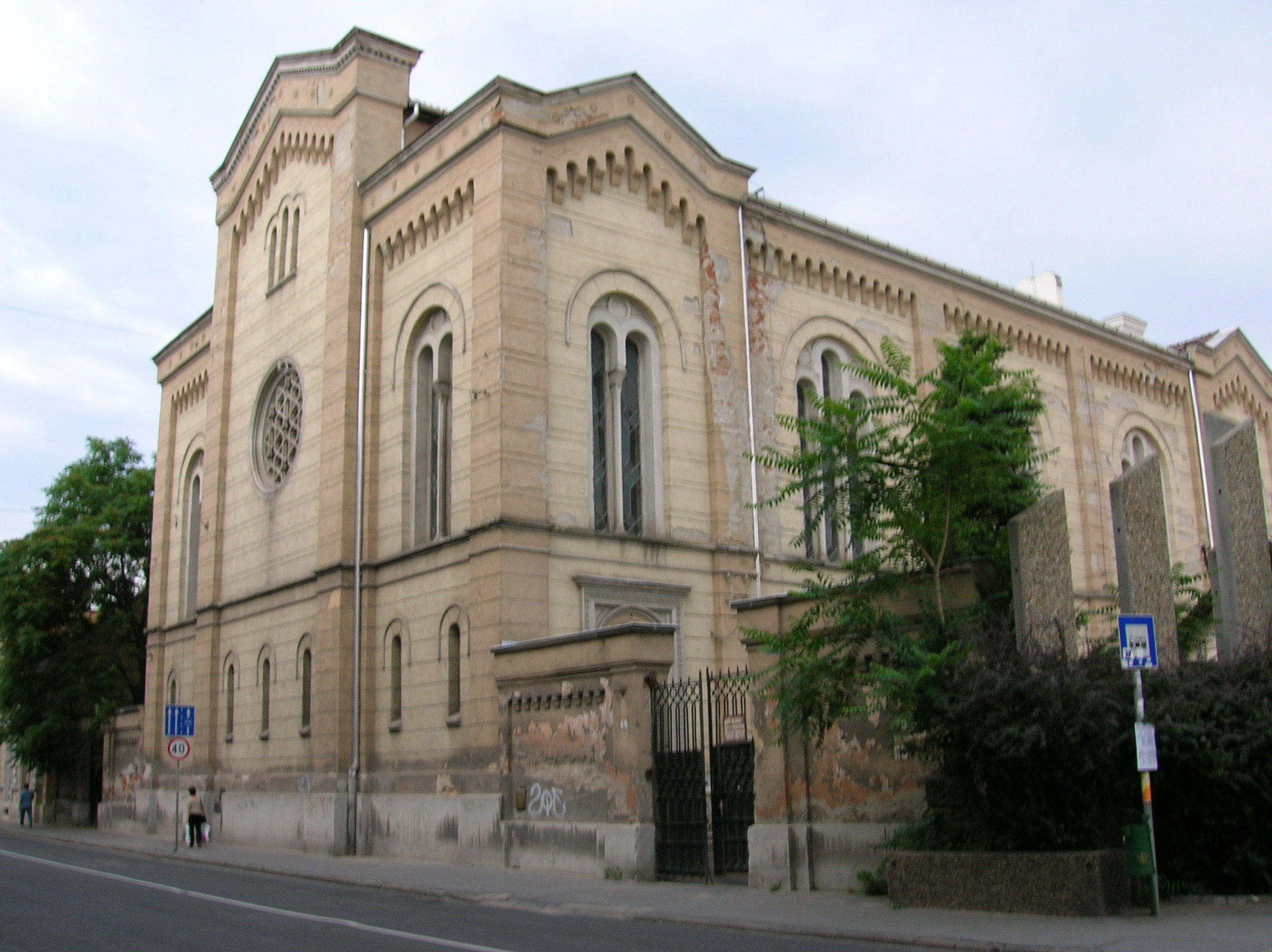
- The synagogue in 2005

- Location of the synagogue in Hungary

Religion
- Affiliation: Orthodox Judaism
- Rite: Nusach Ashkenaz
- Ecclesiastical or organizational status: Synagogue
- Status: Active

Location
- Location: Miskolc, Borsod-Abaúj-Zemplén
- Country: Hungary
- Interactive map of Miskolc Synagogue
- Coordinates: 48°06′14″N 20°47′07″E

Architecture
- Architect: Ludwig Förster
- Type: Synagogue architecture
- Style: Romanesque Revival; Rundbogenstil
- Established: 1850s (as a congregation)
- Groundbreaking: 1856
- Completed: 1862
- Materials: Brick

The Miskolc Synagogue, also called the Kazinczy Street Synagogue or the Great Synagogue of Miskolc, is an Orthodox Jewish congregation and synagogue, located in the town of Miskolc, in the county of Borsod-Abaúj-Zemplén, Hungary. It is the only remaining synagogue in the Borsod-Abaúj-Zemplén county.

== History ==
The synagogue was designed by Ludwig Förster and built between 1856 and 1862 in Romanesque Revival and |Rundbogenstil styles. Its Kazinczy Street façade has a rose window and narrow Gothic Revival windows. The synagogue has three aisles. The women's balcony is supported by slim iron pillars decorated with Gothic Revival and Byzantine Revival elements. The painting of the walls feature ornamental Eastern design.

When designing the synagogue, Förster made some innovations: he had an organ built and the Torah reader's platform was put before the Ark, not in the centre of the synagogue. These innovations were rejected by the Orthodox majority of the city's Jews, and in the year following the opening of the synagogue a rabbinical assembly in Sátoraljaújhely excommunicated the rabbi of Miskolc. The congregation decided to remove the organ from the synagogue and put the platform in the centre, in accord with tradition.

This event led to a split in the Jewish community, and the local Hasidim ("Sefardim") separated from the rest, building a small place of worship in Kölcsey street, which no longer survives. Another synagogue, built in Pálóczy Street in 1817, was demolished in 1963.

According to the 1920 census, Miskolc had approximately 10,000 Jewish residents (16.5% of the total population) but the majority of them fell victim to The Holocaust. At the Déryné Street entrance to the synagogue are marble tablets commemorating the Holocaust. Another commemorative plaque can be seen in János Arany Street, where the ghetto once was.

As of 2001, the city had approximately 500 Jewish residents.

== See also ==
- History of the Jews in Hungary
- List of synagogues in Hungary
