= Emil Ágoston =

Hungarian architect (1876–1921)

Emil Ágoston (originally Adler) (born Zlaté Moravce, German: Goldmorawitz, Hungarian: Aranyosmarót; December 7, 1876 – June 15, 1921, in Berlin), was a notable Hungarian architect.

== Life and career ==
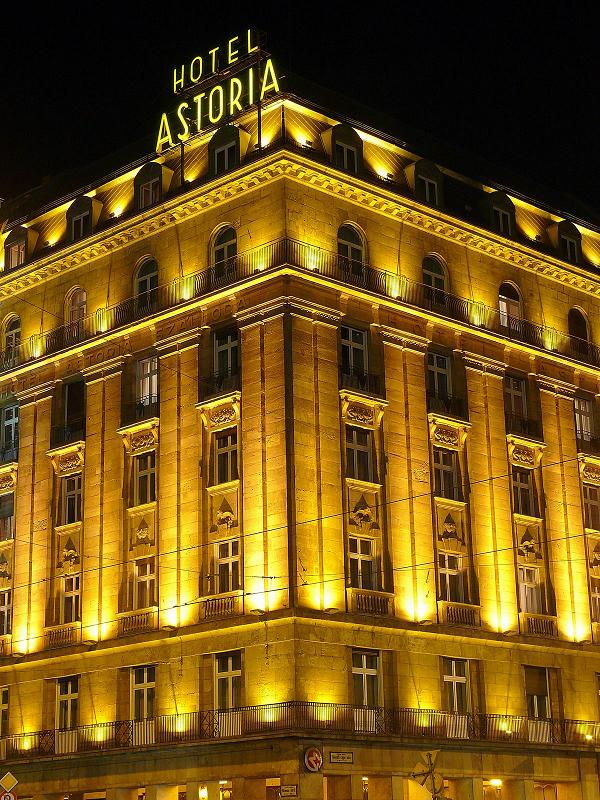
Hotel Astoria, Budapest, 1913

Ágoston graduated at the Budapest Technical University in 1899 and completed further studies in Italy. He also spent time living in Berlin and Paris. His most productive period, as a sought- after designer of apartment buildings in Budapest, was between 1906 and 1911. His style was influenced by the Romantic style, particularly its north German variants. After 1919 he established a partnership with his brother, Géza. Together they built the Roman baths in Budapest and a similar project in the Netherlands.

== Works ==
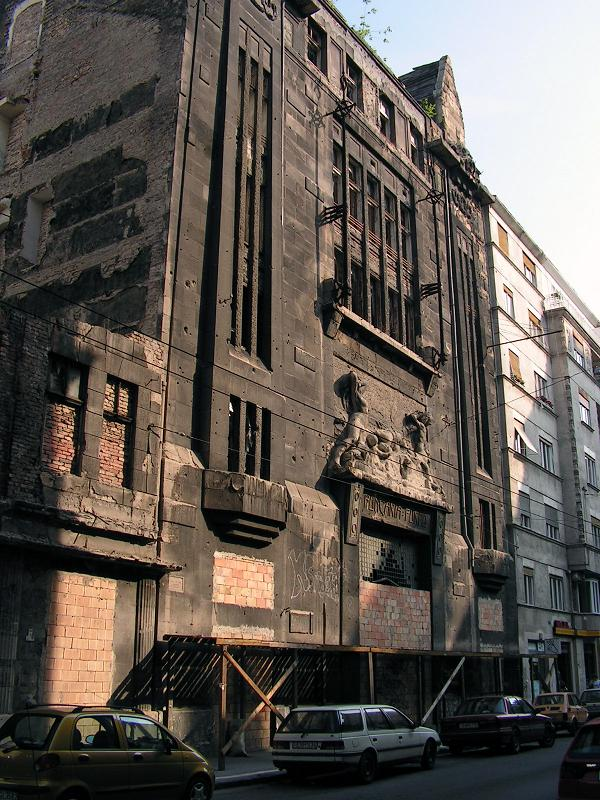
Hungaria baths, Budapest, 1906-07

Budapest

- Hungaria baths (VII. Dohány utca 44.) now Hotel Zara, 1906-07
- Unger house (V. Irányi u. 10.), 1906–07
- Csasznek house (I. Attila út 47.), 1906–07
- Krayer house (XIII. Csanády u. 2.), 1909–10
- Apartment building (V. Dorottya u. 9.), 1909–10
- Gyenes villa (II. Nyúl u. 6.), 1909–10
- Apartment building (VII. Wesselényi u. 32.). A 5-storey corner building which shows the north German influences but little has remained of its original facade decorations (a protected building since 1994), 1909–10
- Former Magyar Bank (V. Kristóf tér), 1913
- Bank building (V. Bajcsy-Zsilinszky u. 36), 1913
- Astoria Hotel (Múzeum körút), with elements of the neoclassical style, 1913

Abroad

- Trieste synagogue (1908)
- Frankfurt synagogue (2nd prize in competition)
- Pervát — Jékey Albert Castle (1907)
