= Ludwig Förster =

Austrian architect (1797–1863)

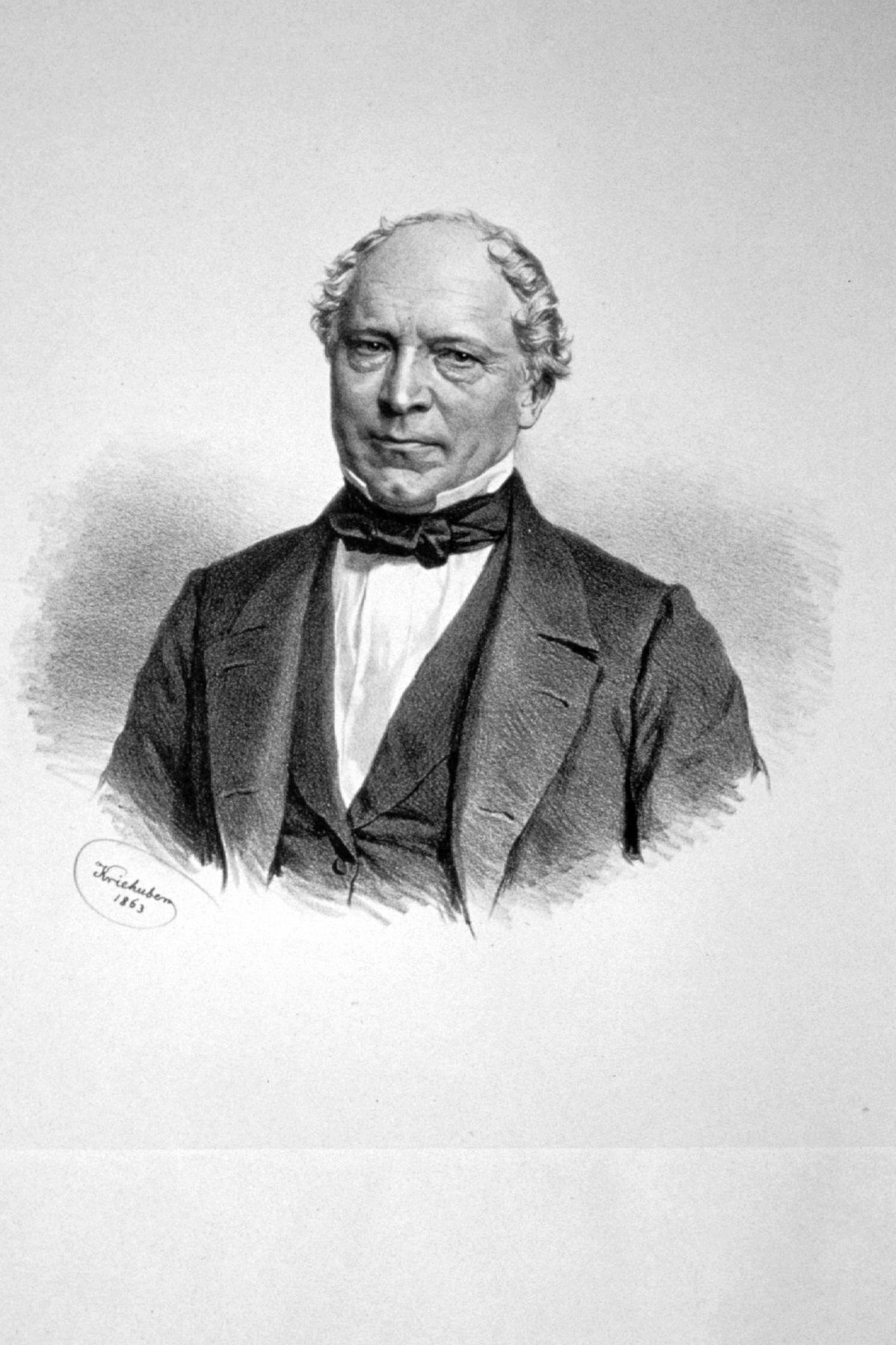
- Lithography by Josef Kriehuber, 1863
- Born: 8 October 1797; Ansbach
- Died: 16 June 1863 (aged 65); Bad Gleichenberg, Styria

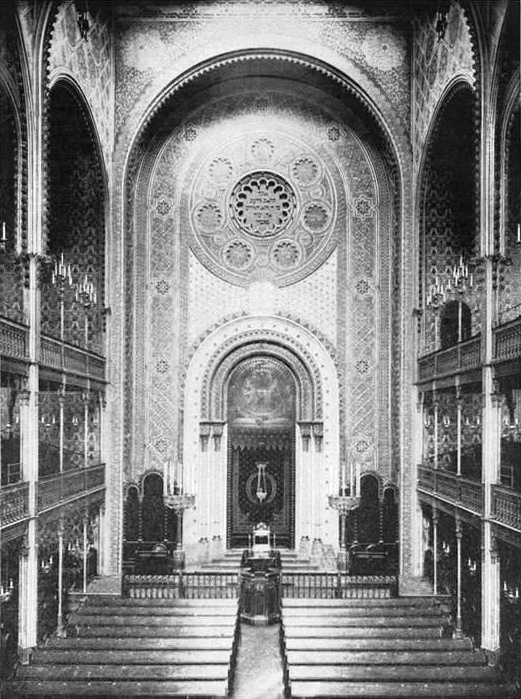
Leopoldstädter Temple

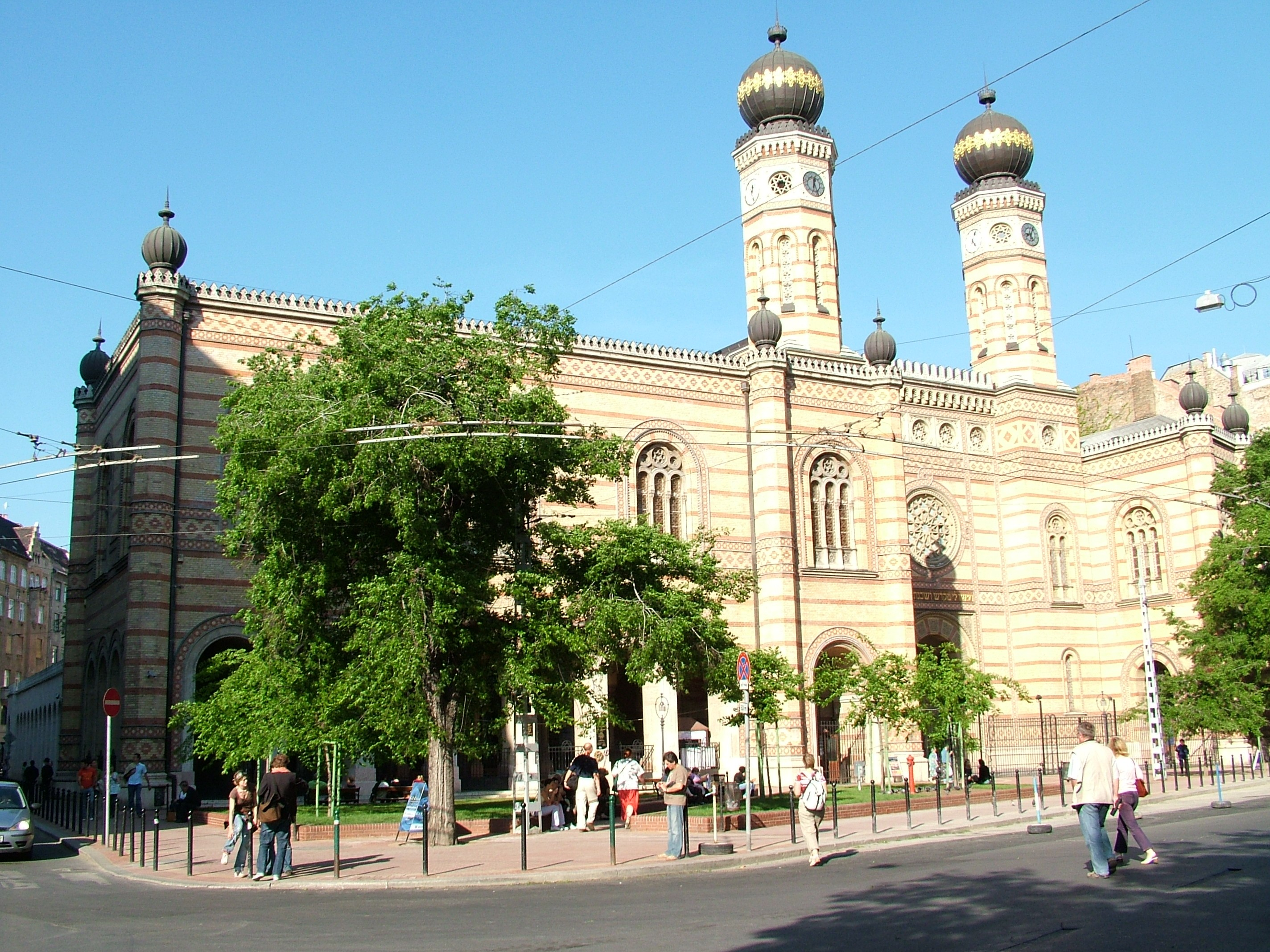
Dohány Street Synagogue

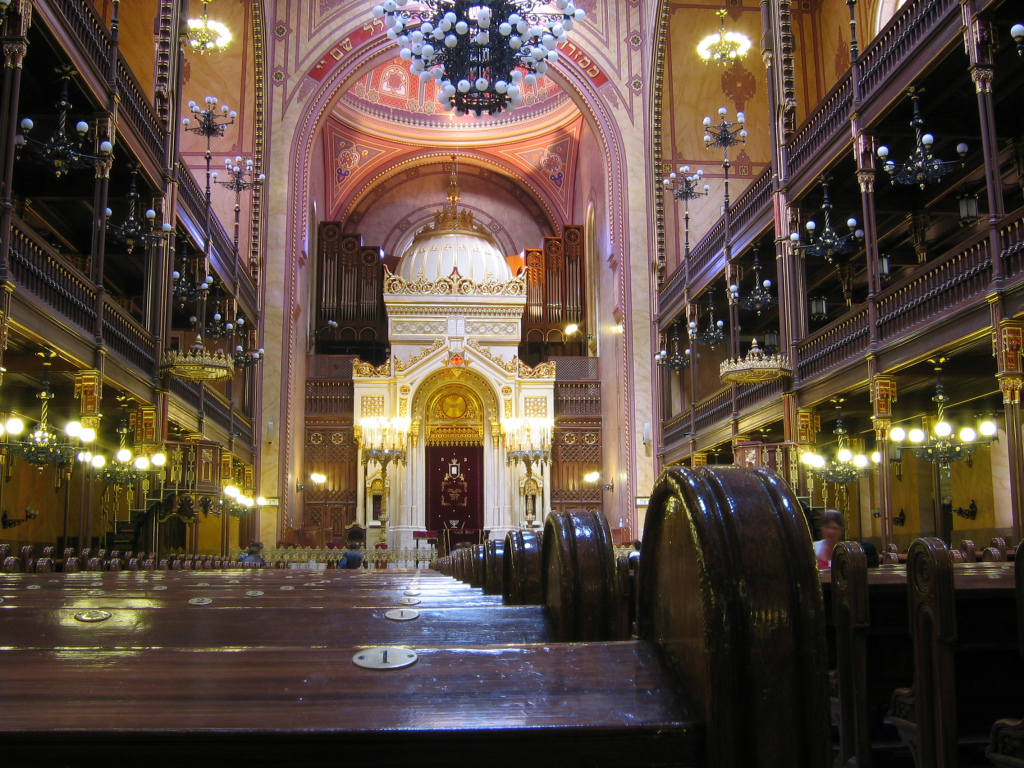
Dohány Street Synagogue

Ludwig Christian Friedrich (von) Förster (8 October 1797 – 16 June 1863) was a German-born Austrian architect. While he was not Jewish, he is known for building Jewish synagogues and churches.

Ludwig Förster studied in Munich and Vienna. He founded the Allgemeine Bauzeitung in 1836. From 1842 to 1845, he taught at the Academy of Fine Arts Vienna and influenced a generation of Viennese architects through his architectural studio.

From 1839/40 he worked as a freelance architect. Otto Wagner, among others, was a member of his studio. From 1846 to 1852, Förster worked with his son-in-law Theophil Freiherr von Hansen. He contributed to the Ringstraße. Berlin-educated Ignaz Wechselmann became his friend and assistant. Förster superintended the construction of the Dohány Street Synagogue in Budapest, which along with the Leopoldstädter Tempel and the Synagogue of Miskolc is his most important work. Forster and Hansen designed the structure — the largest synagogue in Europe — based on Byzantine-Moorish style as shown through features such as the polychromic building with onion domes and arched gates.

From 1861 to 1863 he was a member of the Viennese city council (Gemeinderat).

Förster's sons, Heinrich and Emil, were also architects. The latter worked for his father and then for the government, completing the renovation of the Hofburg and Burgtheater.

== Notable works ==
- Theater Reduta, Bürgerhäuser, Brno (1831)
- Evangelische Kirche Gumpendorf (1849)
- Villa Pereira, Königstetten (1849)
- Arsenal, Vienna (1849-1856)
- Maria-Hilf-Kirche, Vienna (1854)
- Dohány Street Synagogue, Budapest (1854-1859)
- Augarten-Casino, Brno (1855)
- Leopoldstädter Tempel, Vienna (1858)
- Elisabethbrücke, Vienna (1858, demolished 1897)
- Synagogue of Miskolc, Miskolc, 1863
- Palais Todesco, Vienna (1863)
