= Dohány Street Synagogue =

Synagogue in Budapest, Hungary

- Hungarian: Dohány utcai zsinagóga Hebrew: בית הכנסת הגדול של בודפשט
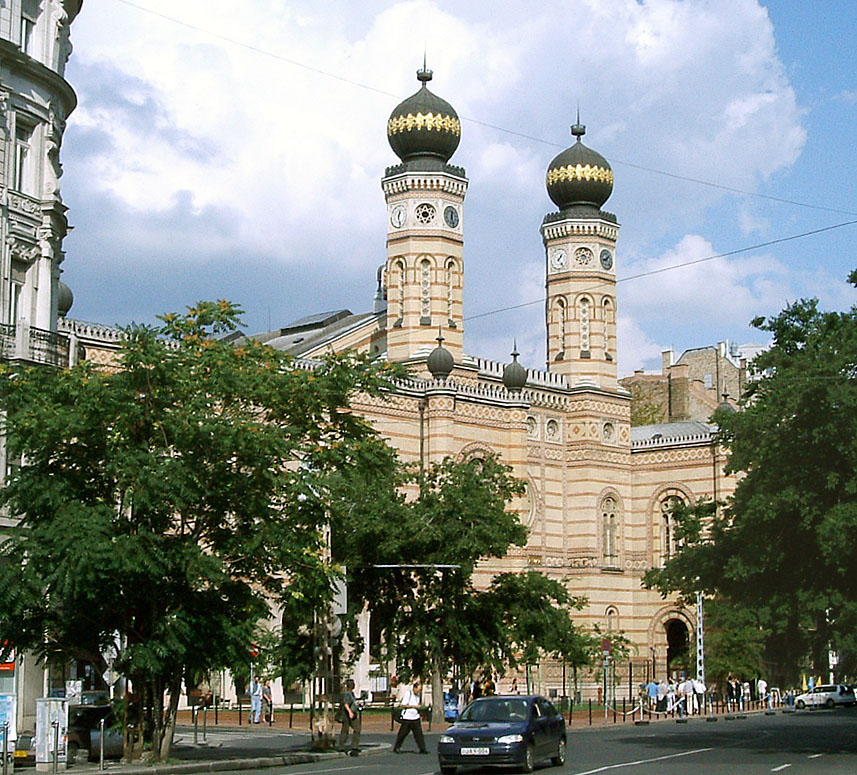
- The synagogue from Dohány Street in 2005

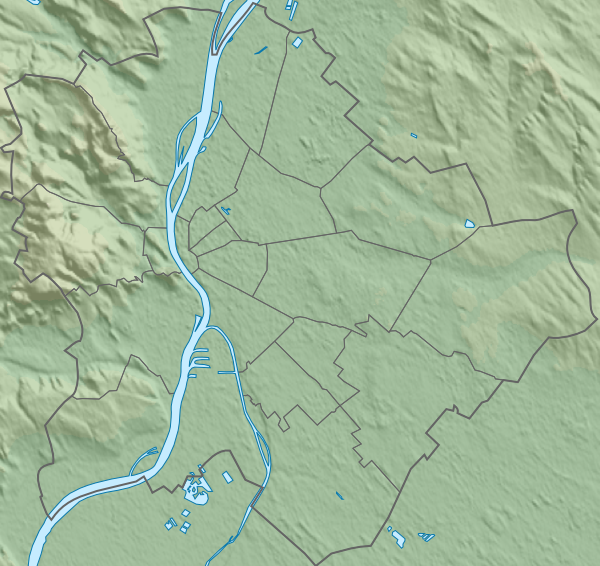
- Location of the synagogue in Budapest

Religion
- Affiliation: Neolog Judaism
- Rite: Nusach Ashkenaz
- Ecclesiastical or organisational status: Synagogue
- Status: Active

Location
- Location: Dohány Street, Erzsébetváros (VIIth district), Budapest
- Country: Hungary
- Coordinates: 47°29′45″N 19°03′39″E

Architecture
- Architects: Ludwig Förster (exterior); Frigyes Feszl (interior design)
- Type: Synagogue architecture
- Style: Moorish Revival; Romantic Historicist
- Groundbreaking: 1854
- Completed: 1859

Specifications
- Direction of façade: South-west by south
- Capacity: 2,964 seats
- Length: 75 m (246 ft)
- Width: 27 m (89 ft)
- Width (nave): 12 m (39 ft)
- Height (max): 43.6 m (143 ft)
- Dome: Two
- Materials: Brick

Website
- dohany-zsinagoga.hu

The Dohány Street Synagogue ([ˈdoɦaːɲ] DOE-hawng; Hungarian: Dohány utcai zsinagóga; Hebrew: בית הכנסת הגדול של בודפשט, romanized: Bet ha-Knesset ha-Gadol shel Budapesht), also known as the Great Synagogue (Hungarian: Nagy zsinagóga) or Tabakgasse Synagogue (Yiddish: Tabak-Shul), (Note: Dohány means 'tobacco' in Hungarian, a loan word from Ottoman Turkish دخان (duhân), itself borrowed from Arabic دخان (duḫḫān). A similar Turkish loanword for tobacco is used throughout the Balkans (e.g., duhan in Bosnian). Theodor Herzl in his speeches and the Jewish Encyclopedia referred to the Dohány Street Synagogue as the Tabakgasse Synagogue.) is a Neolog Jewish congregation and synagogue, located on Dohány Street in Erzsébetváros (VIIth district) of Budapest, Hungary. It is the largest synagogue in Europe, seating 3,000 people, and is a centre of Neolog Judaism. The congregation worships in the Ashkenazi rite.

The synagogue was built between 1854 and 1859 in the Moorish Revival and Romantic Historicist styles, with the decoration based chiefly on Islamic architecture from North Africa and medieval Spain (the Alhambra). The synagogue's Viennese architect, Ludwig Förster, believed that no distinctively Jewish architecture could be identified, and thus chose "architectural forms that have been used by oriental ethnic groups that are related to the Israelite people, and in particular the Arabs". The interior design is partly by Frigyes Feszl.

The Dohány Street Synagogue complex consists of the Great Synagogue, the Heroes' Temple, a graveyard, a memorial, and the Hungarian Jewish Museum and Archives, the latter built on the site of the house where Theodor Herzl was born. Dohány Street was the border of the Budapest Ghetto during the Holocaust.

== History ==
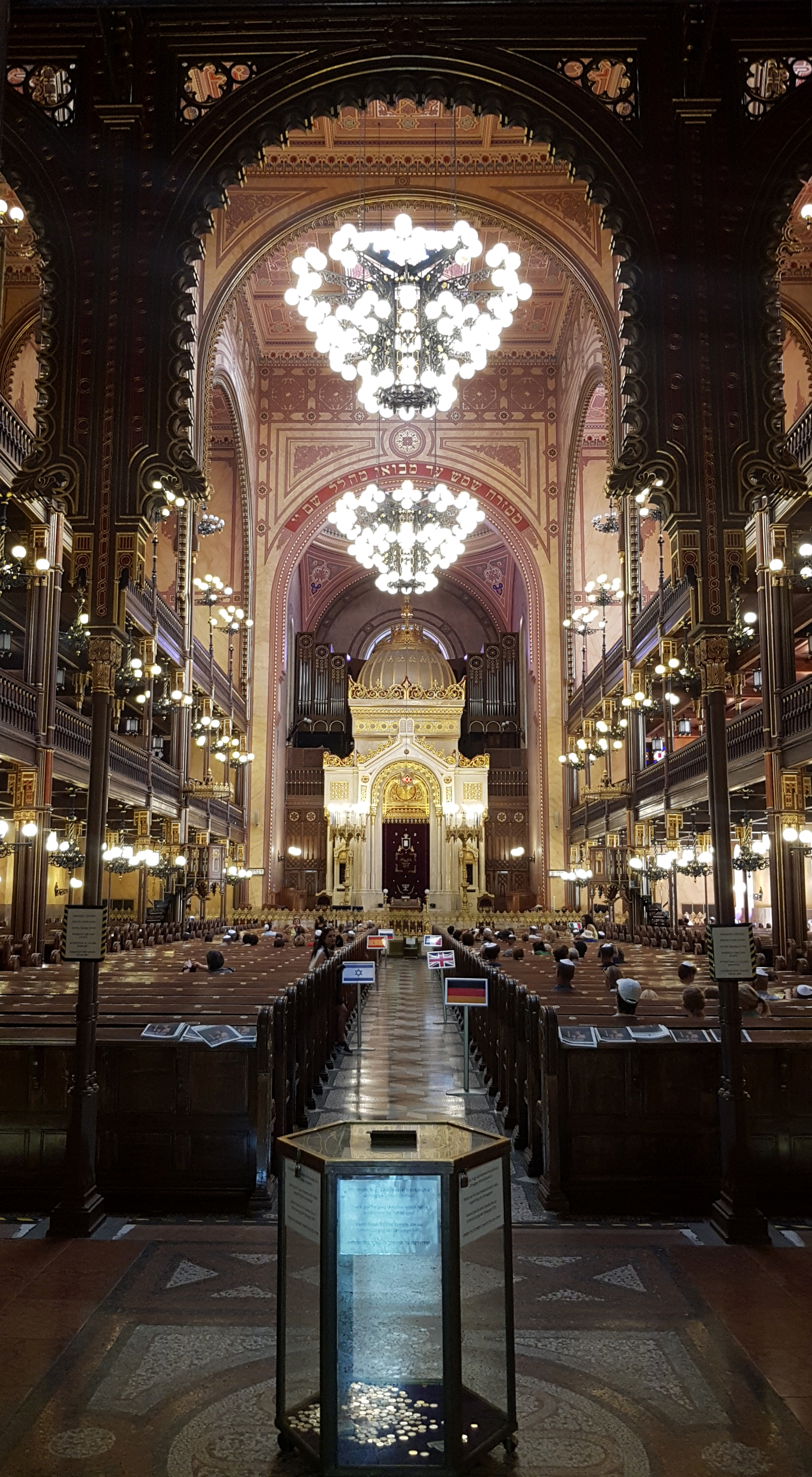
Interior of the Dohány Street Synagogue showing the nave

Built in a residential area between 1854 and 1859 by the Jewish community of Pest, in accord with the plans of Ludwig Förster, the monumental synagogue was intended to be the first distinctive manifestation of Jewish presence in the city. It was consecrated on 6 September 1859. As a special celebratory act to mark the completion of the building, the keystone was placed in the Torah ark with a silver trowel made purposely for the occasion. This trowel, together with the keys of the synagogue, is kept at the adjacent Jewish Museum.

The synagogue was designed to hold a capacity of 2,964 seats (1,492 for men and 1,472 in the women's galleries), making it the largest Jewish place of worship constructed before the 20th century. Today it is the largest in Europe, and one of the largest working synagogues in the world, after Temple Emanu-el in New York City and the Belz Great Synagogue in Jerusalem.

The synagogue endured a significant amount of war damage. It was bombed by the Hungarian pro-Nazi Arrow Cross Party on 3 February 1939. Used as a base for German Radio, and also as a stable for animals during World War II, the building suffered some severe damage from air raids during the Nazi occupation, especially during the Siege of Budapest. During the Communist era, the damaged structure became again a prayer house for the much-diminished Jewish community. Its restoration and renovation started in 1991, financed by the state and by private donations, and was completed in 1998.

== Architecture ==
=== Exterior ===
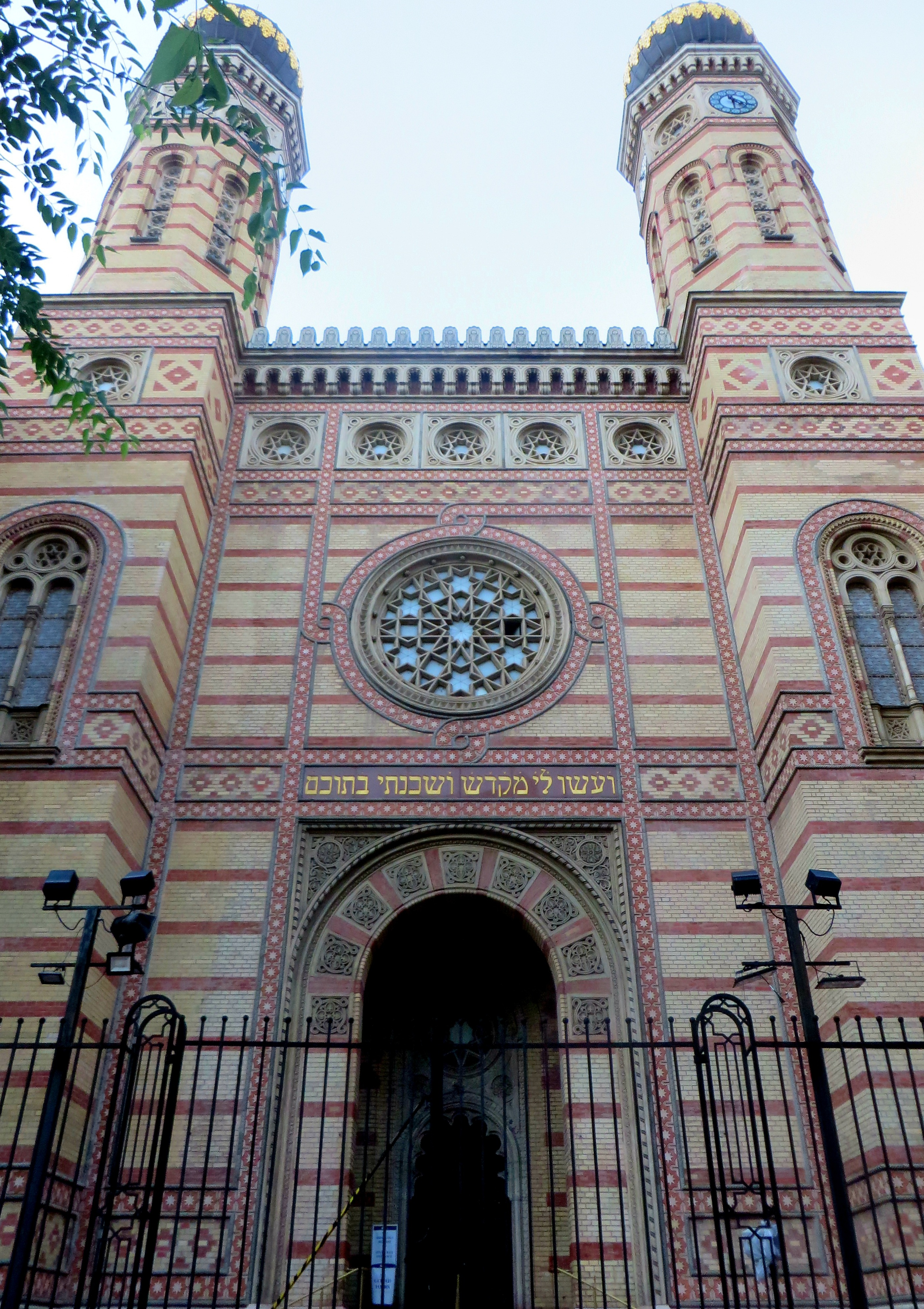
The façade

The building is 75 metres (246 ft) long and 27 metres (89 ft) wide. The Dohány Street Synagogue was completed in the Moorish Revival and Romantic Historicist styles, while its design also features a mixture of Byzantine Revival, Romanesque Revival, and Gothic Revival elements. The façade is characterised by twin octagonal towers, on which rest two onion domes at 43 metres (141 ft) height. An elaborate stone cornice separates the towers, featuring oriental-style crenellations, while a rose window sits over the main entrance. Jewish iconographic elements, such as the Star of David and the Stone Tablets, are alluded to in the external ornamentation. The Moorish element is evidenced by the alternating yellow and red brickwork.

The synagogue is not aligned with the axis of the street, but rather occupies an asymmetric lot, with the façade overlooking an irregularly shaped small square. The square bears markings which depict a menorah when viewed from above.

Central Synagogue in Manhattan, New York City, is inspired by the Dohány Street Synagogue.

=== Interior ===
Like Christian basilicas, the building comprises three spacious richly decorated aisles, as well as two balconies and, unusually, an organ. The Torah ark and the internal frescoes, made of colored and golden geometric shapes, are the works of the famous Hungarian romantic architect Frigyes Feszl. The ark contains various Torah scrolls taken from other synagogues destroyed during the Holocaust.

A single-span cast iron supports the 12-metre-wide (39 ft) nave. The seats on the ground-floor are for men, while the upper gallery, supported by steel ornamented poles, has seats for women. This synagogue is very different from other synagogues as it is the only one to have pipe organs and a cemetery.

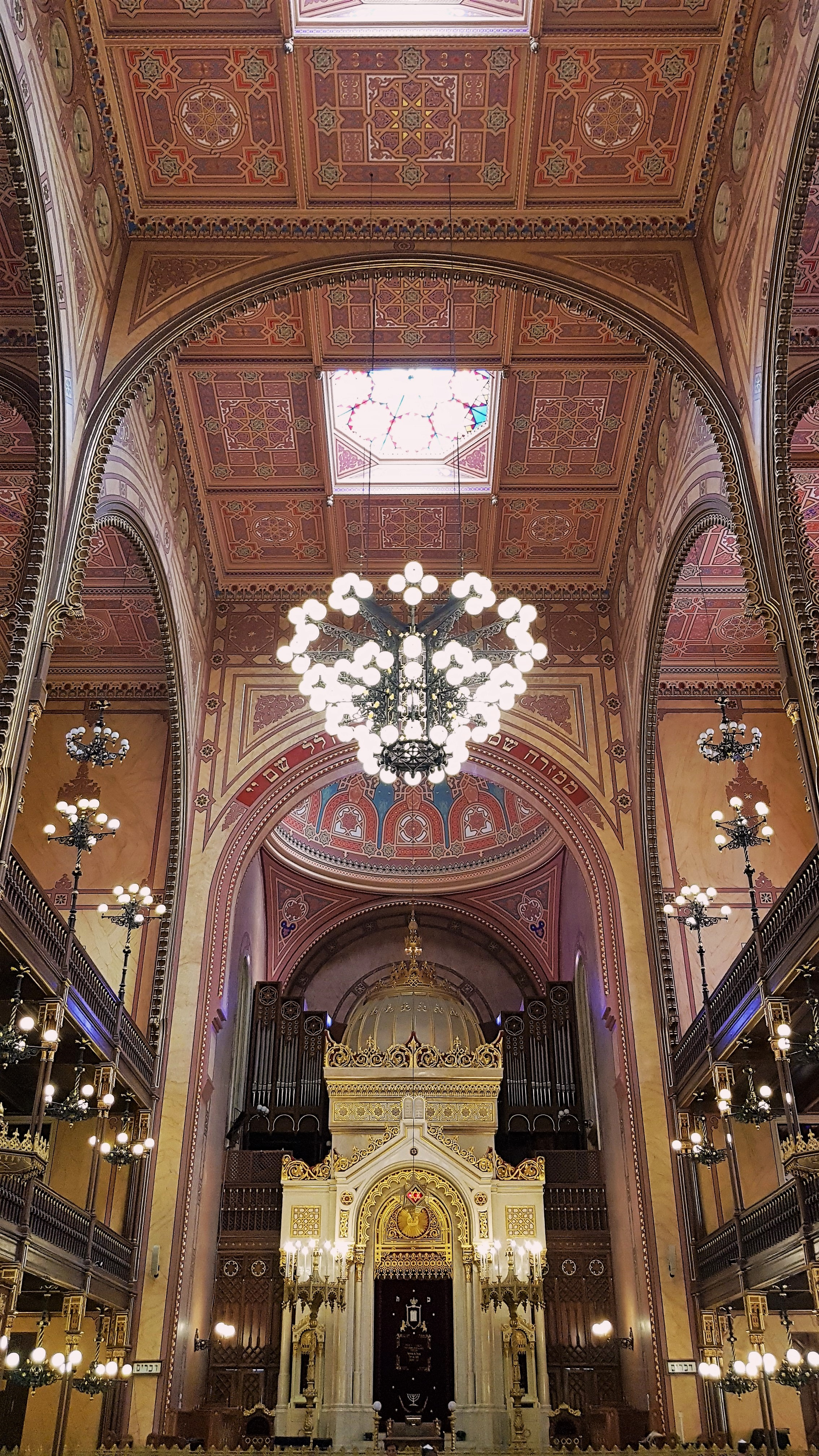
Interior with bimah and ceiling

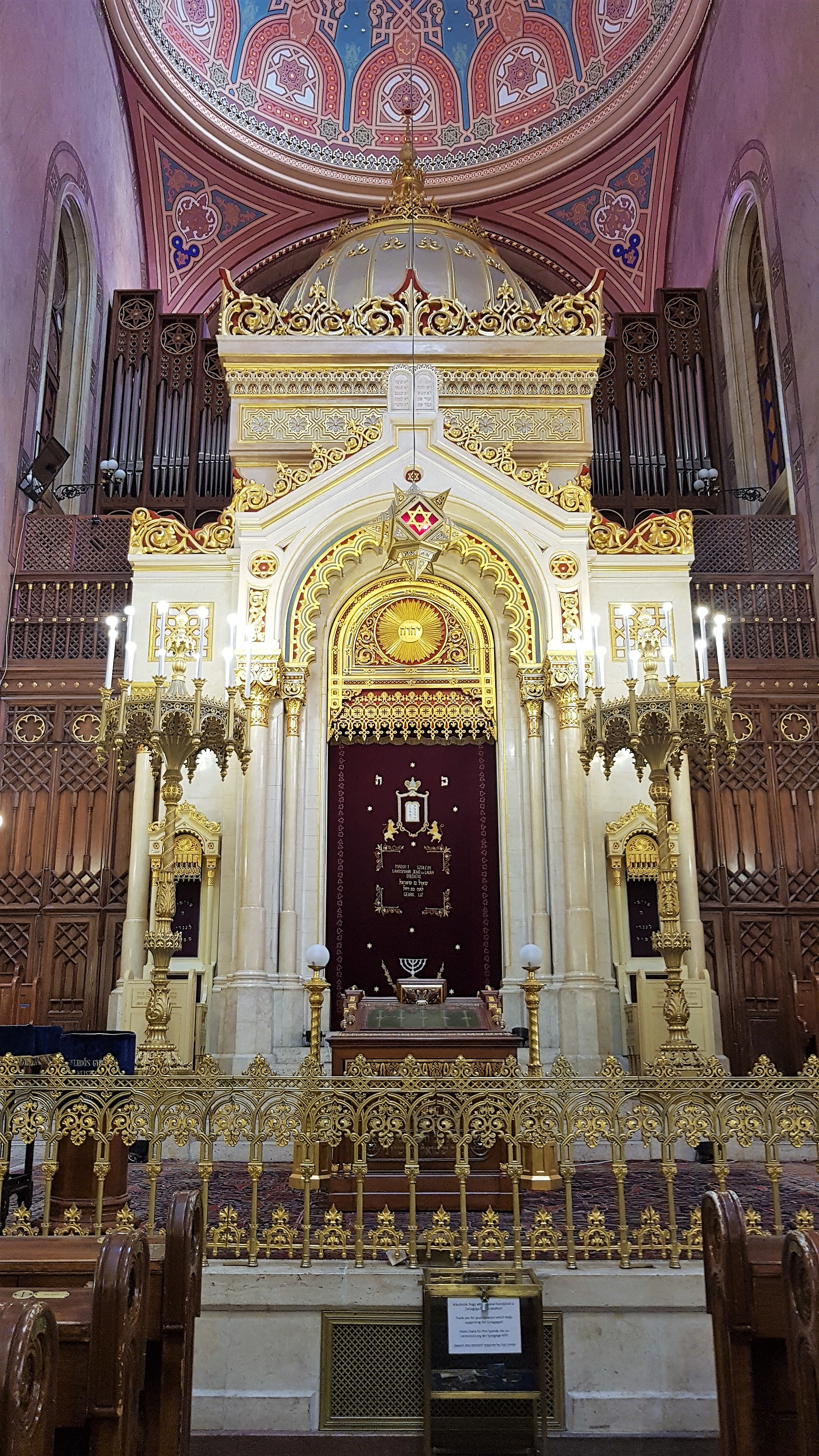
The Torah ark

Rear view

Franz Liszt and Camille Saint-Saëns played the original 5,000-pipe organ built in 1859. A new mechanical organ with 63 voices and four manuals was built in 1996 by the German firm Jehmlich Orgelbau Dresden GmbH.

=== Renovation ===
Following the return to democracy in Hungary, renovations began in the 1990s. The three-year program of reconstruction was initially funded by a US$5 million donation from the Hungarian government. Jewish Americans Estée Lauder and Tony Curtis contributed to the additional $20 million needed to complete the restoration in 1996.

== Synagogue complex ==
=== Jewish museum ===
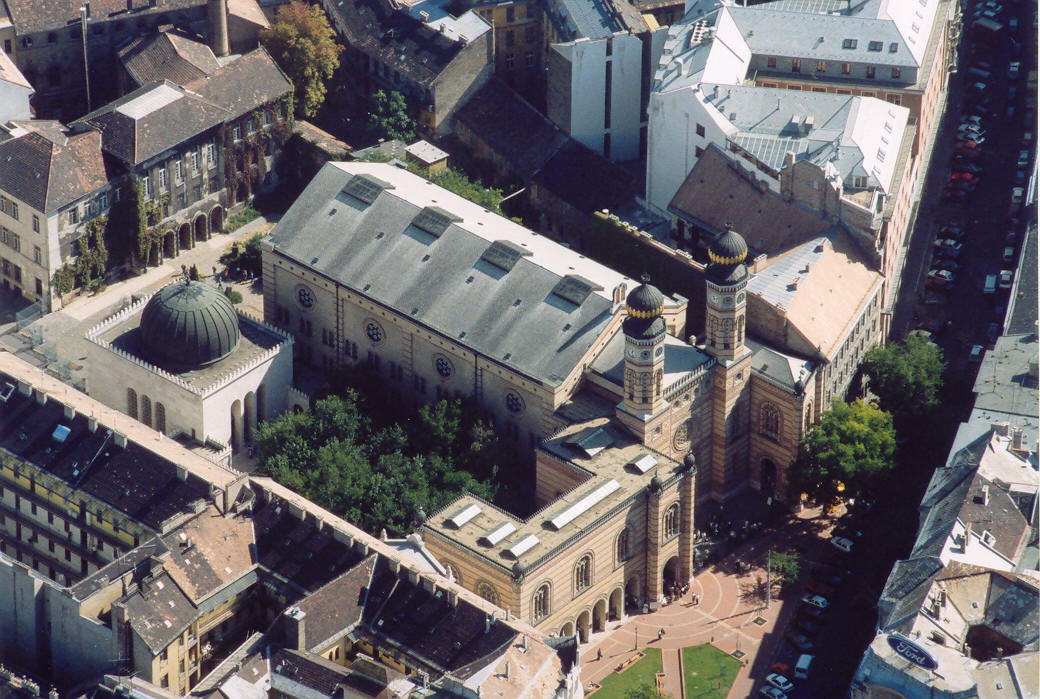
Aerial view of the Dohány Street Synagogue complex

The Hungarian Jewish Museum and Archives (Magyar Zsidó Múzeum és Levéltár) was constructed on the plot where Theodor Herzl's two-story Classicist style house stood, adjoining the Dohány synagogue. The Jewish Museum was built in 1930 in accordance with the synagogue's architectural style and attached in 1931 to the main building. It holds the Jewish Religious and Historical Collection, a collection of religious relics of the Pest Hevrah Kaddishah (Pest Jewish Burial Society), ritual objects of Shabbat and the High Holidays, and a Holocaust room.

=== Heroes' Temple ===
The arcade and the Heroes' Temple, which seats 250 people and is used for religious services on weekdays and during the winter time, was added to the Dohány Street Synagogue complex in 1931. The Heroes' Temple was designed by Lázlo Vágó and Ferenc Faragó and serves as a memorial to Hungarian Jews who gave their lives during World War I.

=== Jewish cemetery ===
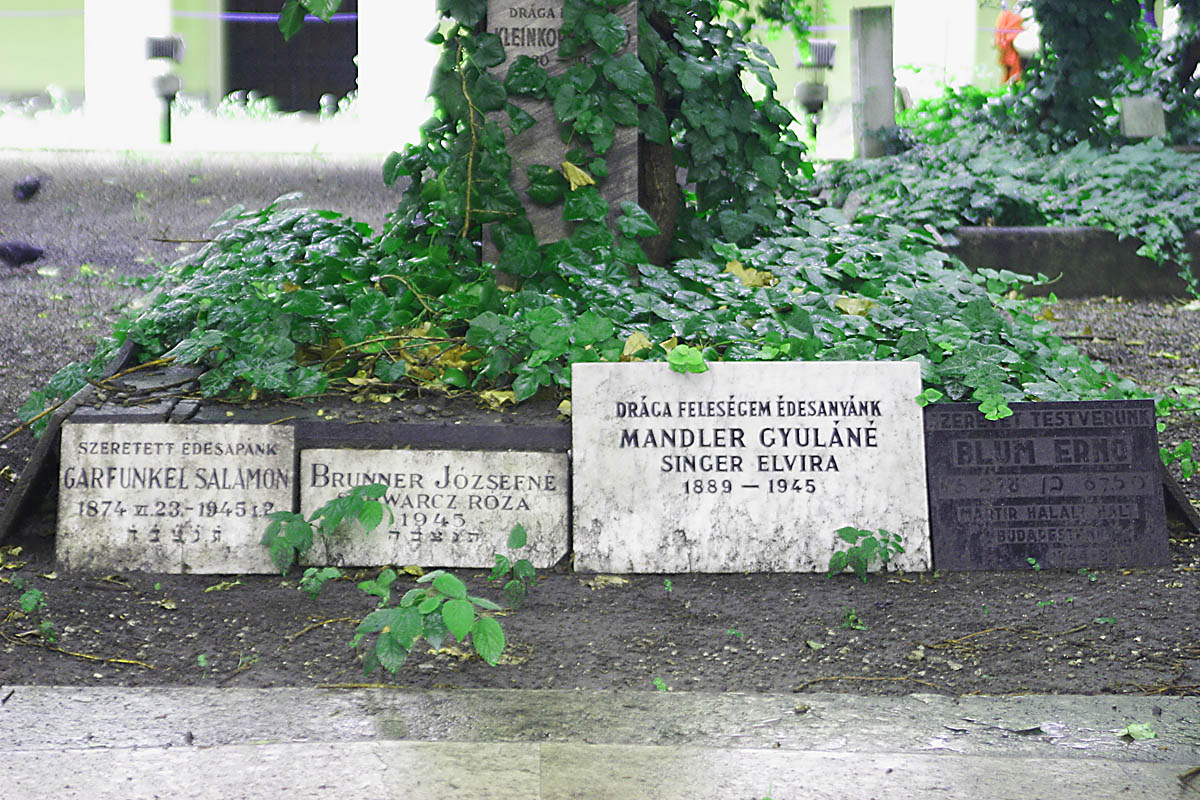
Jewish cemetery

In 1944, the Dohány Street Synagogue was part of the Jewish ghetto for the city Jews and served as shelter for many hundreds. Over two thousand of those who died in the ghetto from hunger and cold during the winter of 1944–1945 are buried in the courtyard of the synagogue.

It is not customary to have a cemetery next to a synagogue (as Torah specifies that decedents are to be buried outside of city limits), and the establishment of the 3,000 m^{2} (32,000 sq ft) cemetery was only the result of historical circumstances. In 1944, as a part of the Eichmann-plan, 70,000 Jews were relocated to the ghetto of Pest. Until 18 January 1945, when the Russians liberated the ghetto, around 8,000 to 10,000 people had died; although some of the deceased were transferred to the Kozma Street Cemetery, 2,000 people were buried in the makeshift cemetery. In memory of those who had died, there is a memorial by the sculptor, Imre Varga, depicting a weeping willow with the names and tattoo numbers of the dead and disappeared just behind the synagogue, in the Raoul Wallenberg Holocaust Memorial Park. (Note: Address: Budapest, VII. Dohány u. 2.)

=== Raoul Wallenberg Holocaust Memorial Park ===
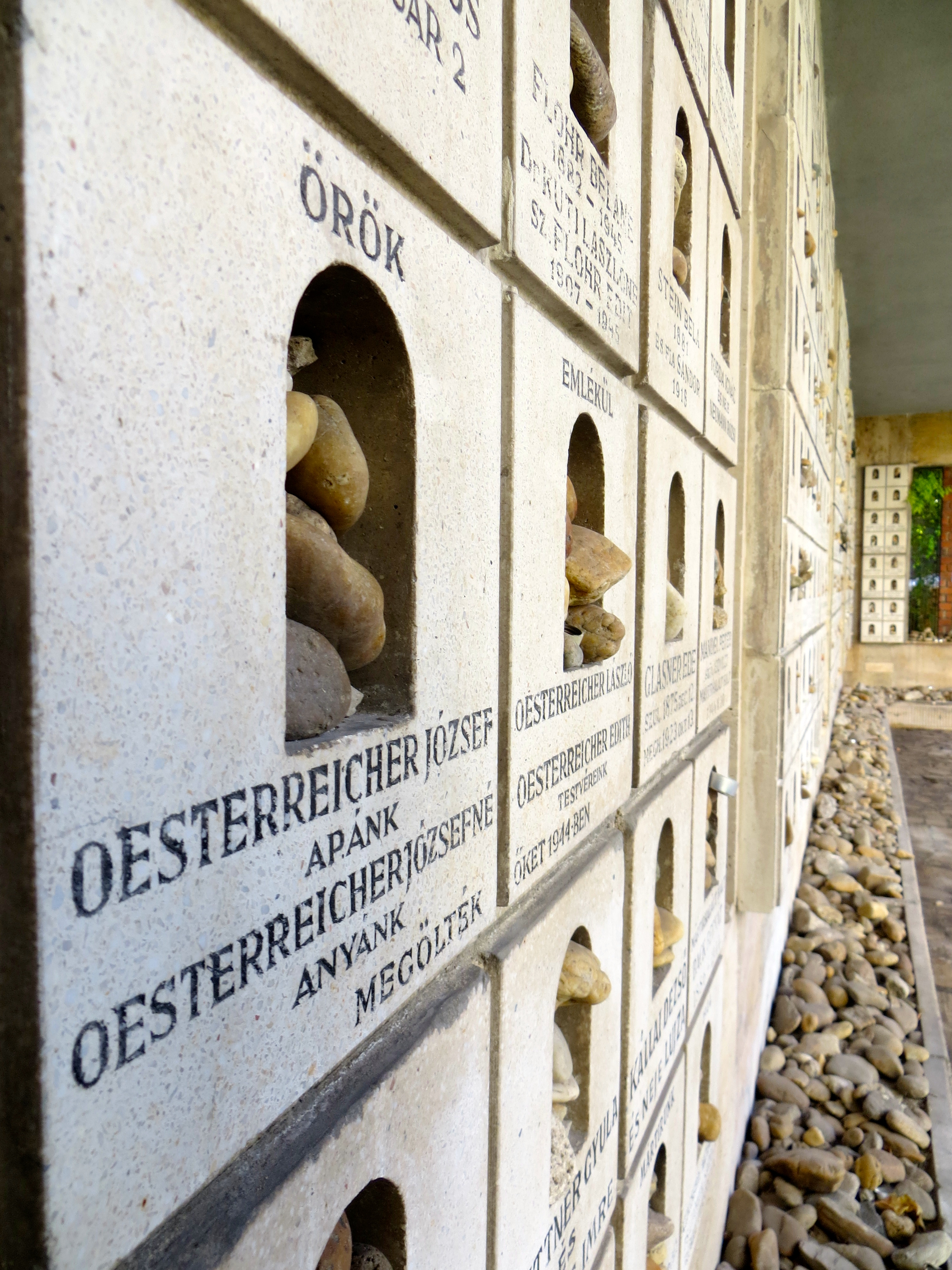
Stones placed in a memorial behind the synagogue

The Raoul Wallenberg Emlékpark (memory park), named in honour of Raoul Wallenberg, is located in the rear courtyard and holds the Memorial of the Hungarian Jewish Martyrs, also known as the Holocaust Tree of Life Memorial. At least 400,000 Hungarian Jews were murdered by the Nazis. Made by Imre Varga, it resembles a weeping willow whose leaves bear inscriptions with the names of victims. There is also a memorial to Wallenberg and other Righteous Among the Nations, among them:

Swiss Vice-consul Carl Lutz; Giorgio Perlasca, an Italian man who, with a strategic escamotage, declared himself the Spanish consul, releasing documents of protection and current passports to Jews in Budapest without distinction (he saved five thousand); Mons. Angelo Rotta, an Italian Prelate Bishop and Apostolic Nuncio of the State of Vatican City in Budapest, who issued protective passes, misrepresentations of baptism (for averting forced labor), and Vatican passports to Jews in Budapest without distinction of any kind, and who, with his secretary Mons. Gennaro Verolino saved tens of thousands of Hungarian Jews; Carlos de Liz-Texeira Branquinho a Portuguese diplomat, serving as Portugal's Chargé d'Affaires in Budapest in 1944, who issued protective passports to hundreds of Jewish families, saving altogether about 1,000 lives; Carlos Sampaio Garrido, the Portuguese Ambassador, who resisted the Hungarian political police when the police raided his home arresting his guests, and who, though also arrested, managed to have his guests released by invoking the extraterritorial legal rights of diplomatic legations.

== Gallery ==
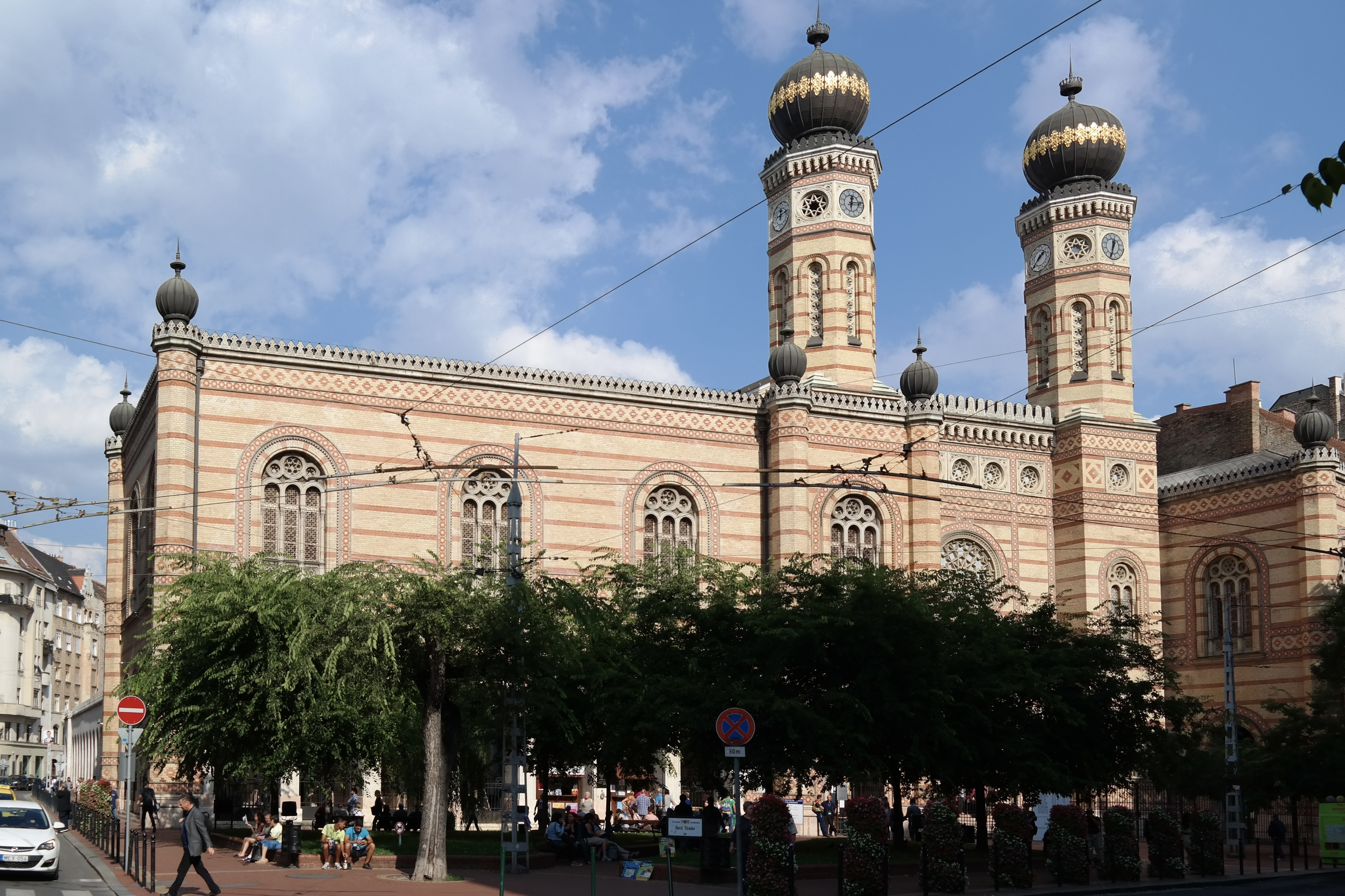
Exterior from the front side

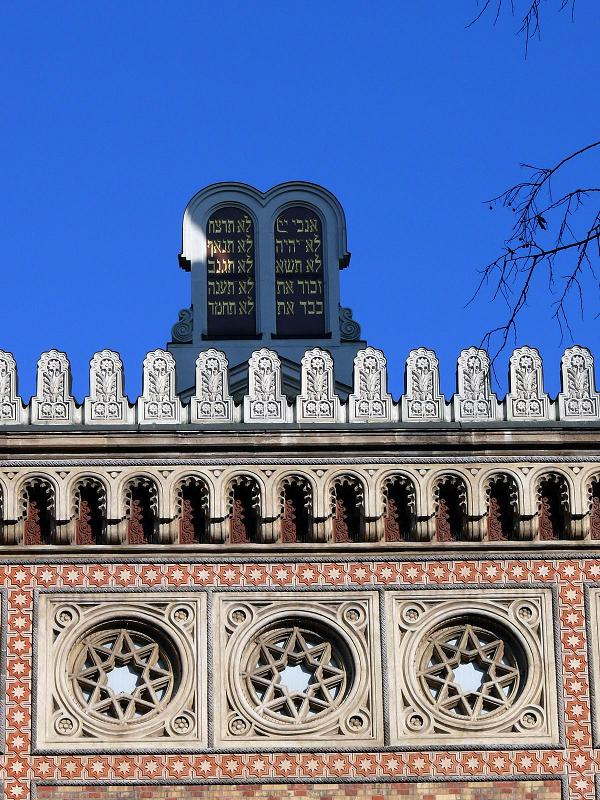
Ornamental detail on the façade

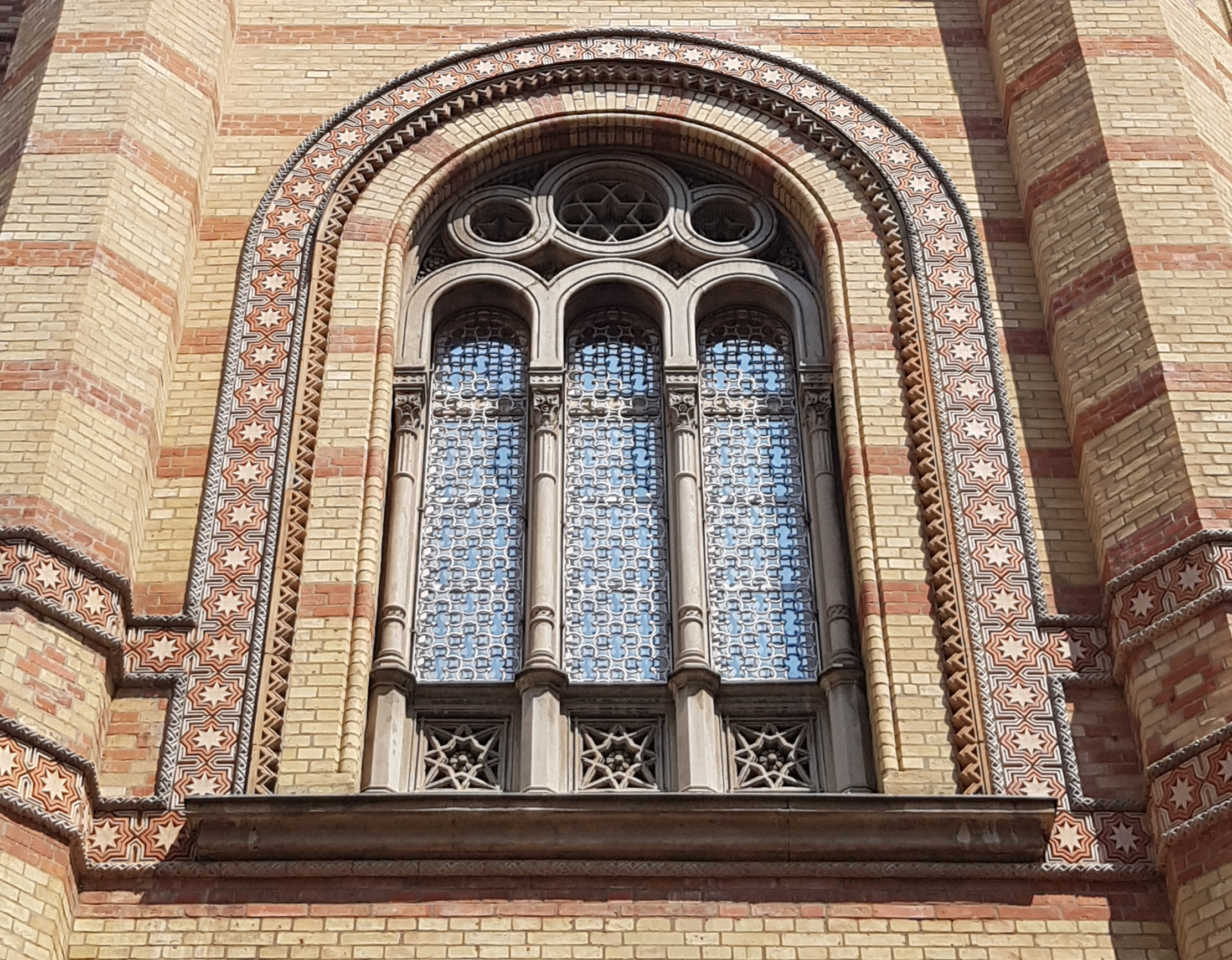
Detail of one of the windows

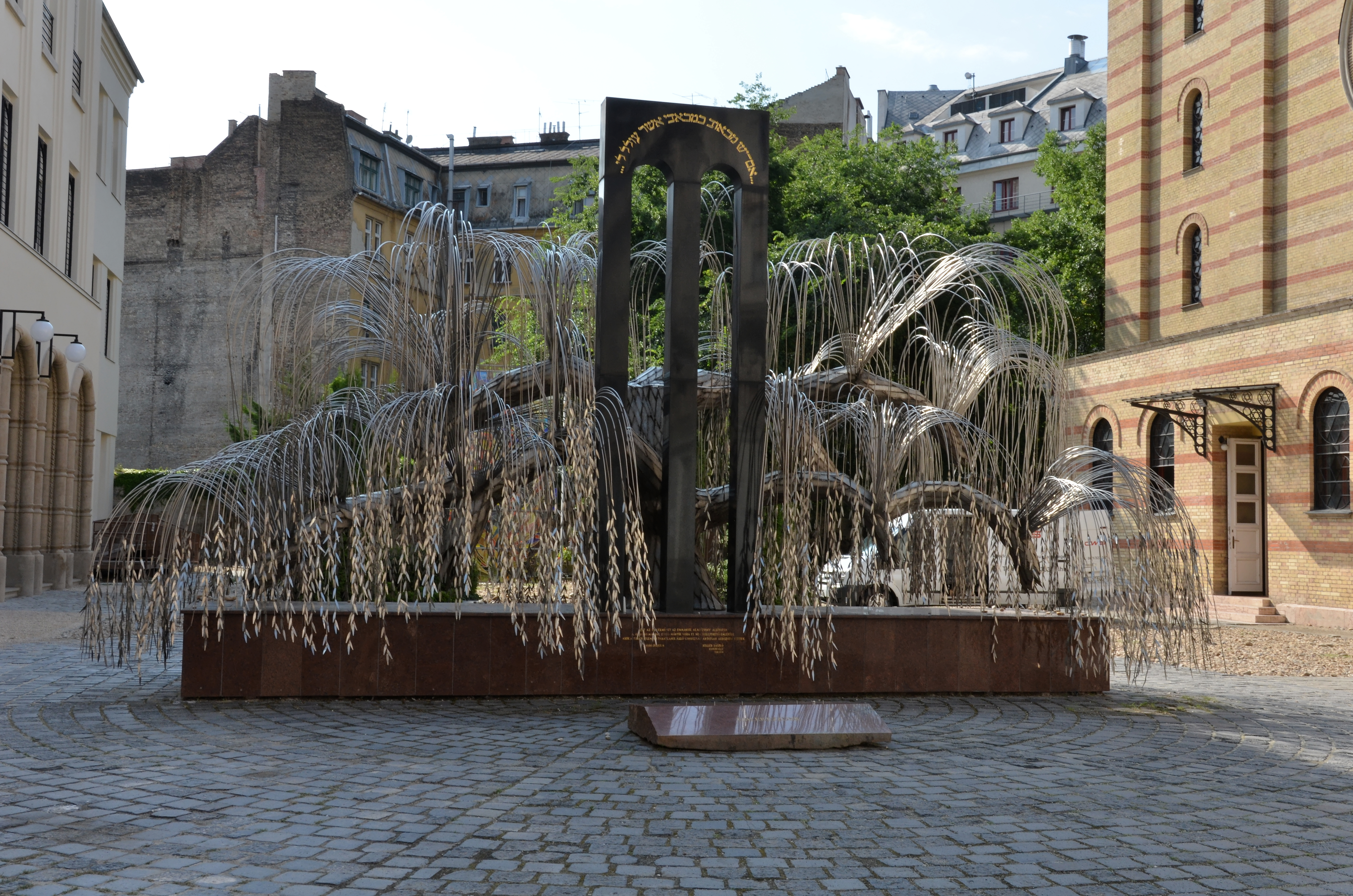
Holocaust Tree of Life Memorial

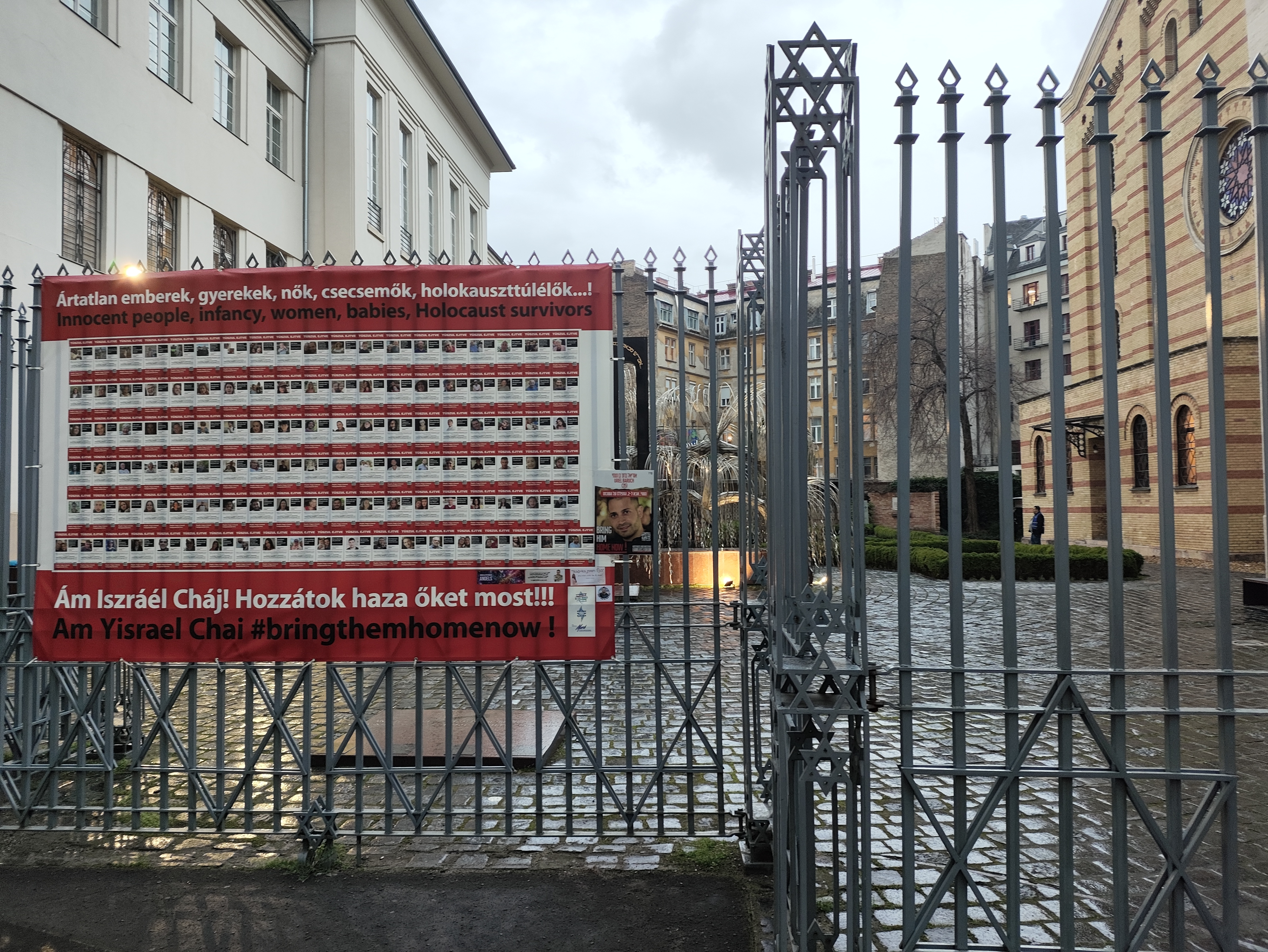
A sign with pictures of the hostages in Gaza, on the synagogue gates

== See also ==
- History of the Jews in Hungary
- List of synagogues in Hungary
