= Imre Varga =

Hungarian sculptor

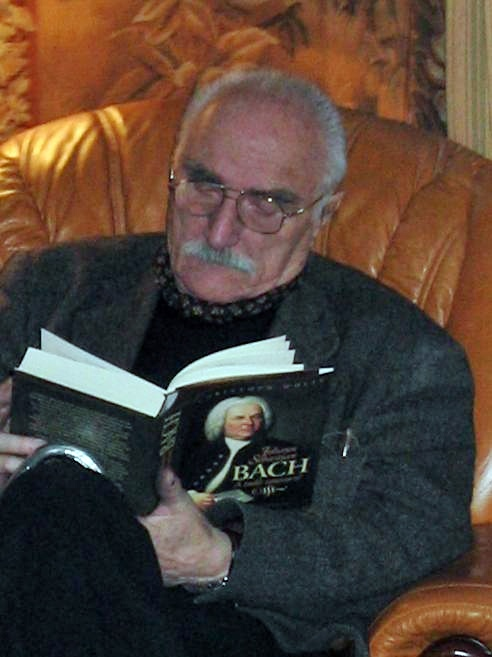
- Imre Varga in 2004
- Born: 1 November 1923; Siófok, Hungary
- Died: 9 December 2019 (aged 96); Budapest, Hungary
- Known for: Statue of Raoul Wallenberg, Tel Aviv; Holocaust memorial, Dohány Street Synagogue, Budapest

Imre Varga (1 November 1923 – 9 December 2019) was a Hungarian sculptor, painter, designer and graphic artist. He was regarded as one of Hungary's most important living artists, and he has been called one of the "most skilled sculptors in Hungary."

== Biography ==
Even as a schoolboy, Varga's drawings were exhibited in small exhibitions. He studied aeronautics at the Military Academy in Budapest. During World War II, he served as an officer in the Hungarian Air Force before being taken as a prisoner of war by the United States, returning to Hungary in 1945 when he turned to the visual arts. From 1950 to 1956, Varga studied at the Hungarian Academy of Fine Arts in Budapest under Sándor Mikus and Pál Pátzay, graduating with a degree. Since then, Varga has worked in many different artistic fields. He has made small statues and coins, as well as monumental works for public spaces.

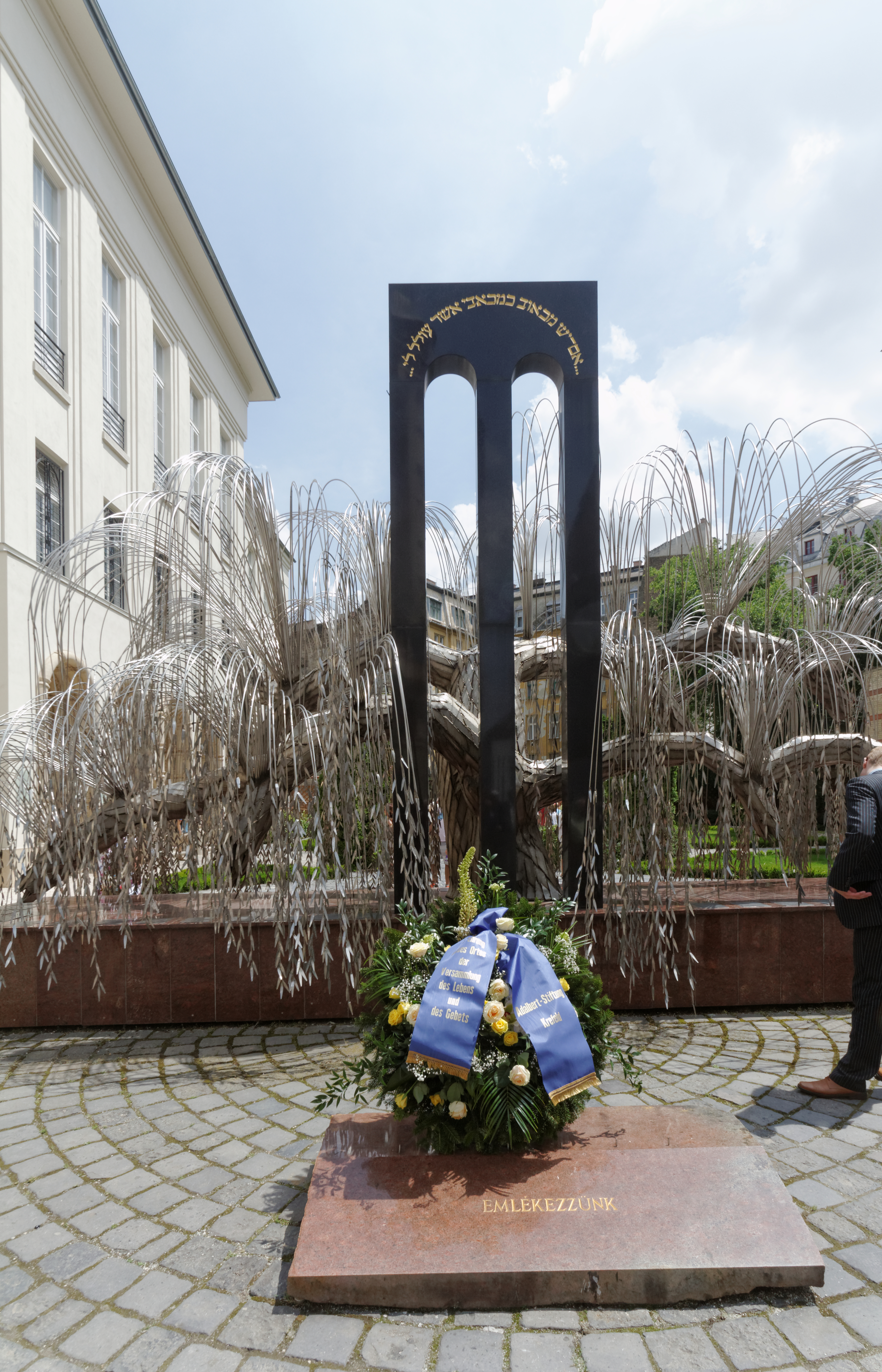
The Holocaust Memorial in Budapest

One of his public statues is the Holocaust Memorial, located behind the Dohany Street Synagogue in Budapest's Jewish Quarter District VII. The memorial is constructed in the shape of a weeping willow tree, with names of Hungarian Holocaust victims on the leaves.

Another well-visited work by Varga is his group of worried-looking women with umbrellas permanently located in a square in Óbuda, Budapest near the Imre Varga Collection of his work.

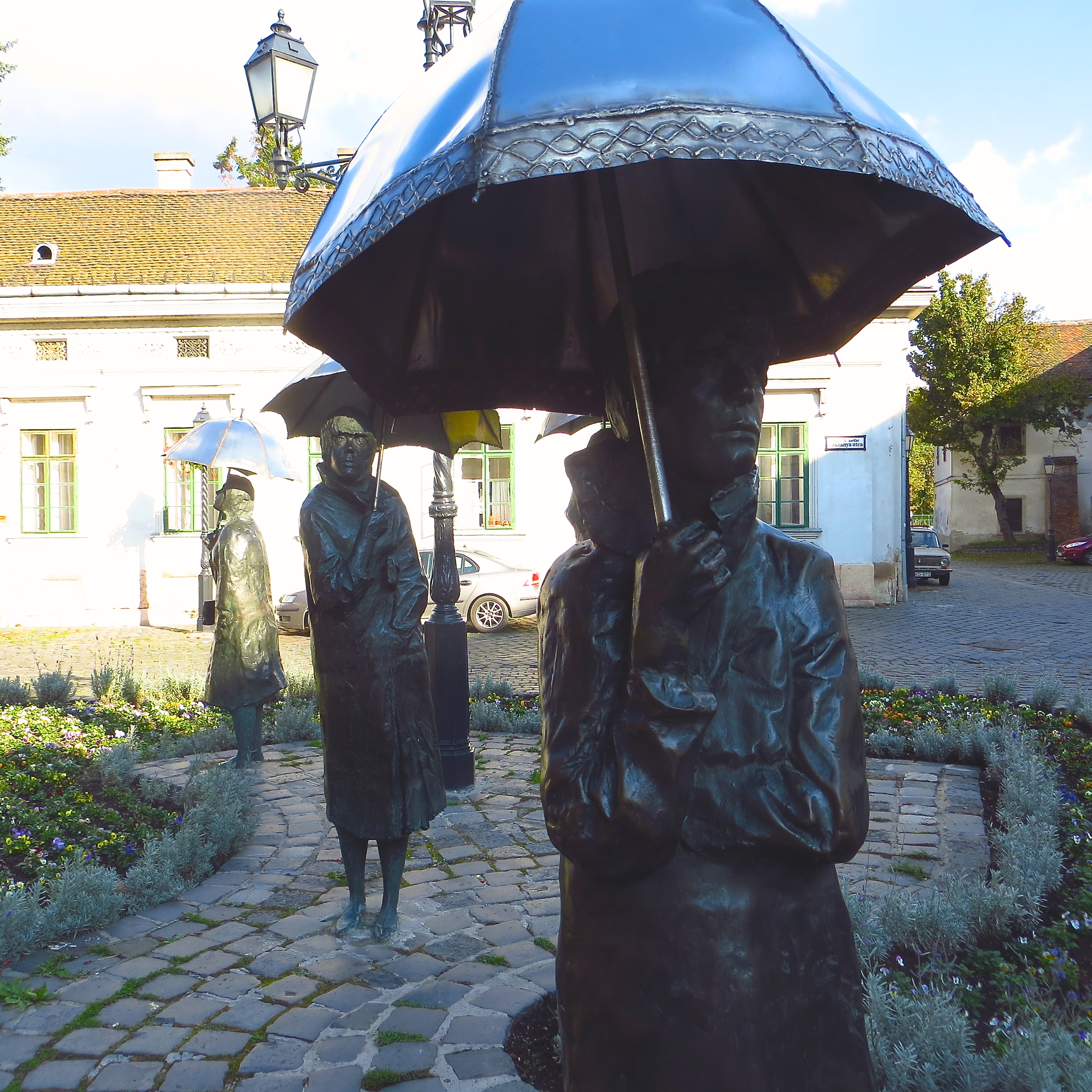
Imre Varga Sculpture of ladies with umbrellas in Obuda, Budapest.

He attended the first "Hungarian Fine Arts Exhibition", where his work "Iron Workers" was exhibited. His first high-profile work, "Prometheus", was created in 1965. In the 1970s, Varga broke away from the conventional monumentalism usually seen in Communist countries. He created a wide array of works – ranging from statues of Vladimir Lenin to the Holocaust, to statues of Francis II Rákóczi, Raoul Wallenberg, Sir Winston Churchill and Béla Bartók to Konrad Adenauer and Charles de Gaulle.

His statue of Raoul Wallenberg is a private gift of an American Ambassador to Hungary, Nicolas M. Salgo. Salgo, who left Hungary before the Nazi occupation, commissioned Imre Varga to create the monument of Wallenberg, which has been placed on Szilágyi Erzsébet Alley in Budapest on 9 April 1987, at a site that is possibly connected with the mystery of Wallenberg's disappearance in February 1945. Imre Varga carved the monument of Wallenberg into the slabs of granite, that was a gift of members of the Wallenberg family, who invited Imre Varga to Sweden to select it. The monument shows Wallenberg, his left hand in the pocket of his raincoat and his right hand pointing forward, striding toward a gap in a forbidding wall formed by the two slabs. A Latin inscription says that when the weather is fine, you have many friends; when skies are cloudy, you will be alone. About 300 works of Imre Varga are now exhibited in nine countries.

Varga died on 9 December 2019 at the age of 96.

== Gallery ==
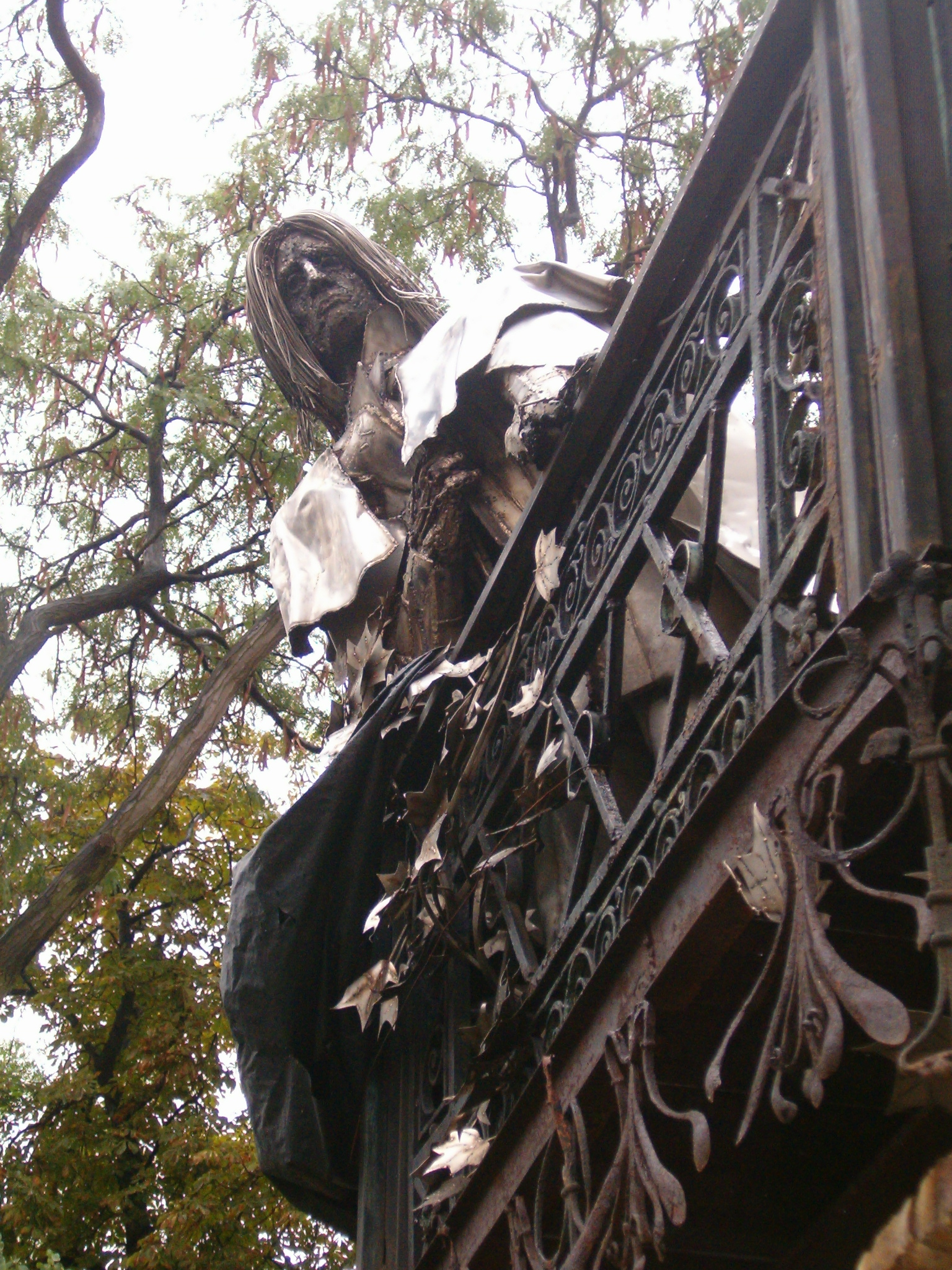
Statue of Franz Liszt

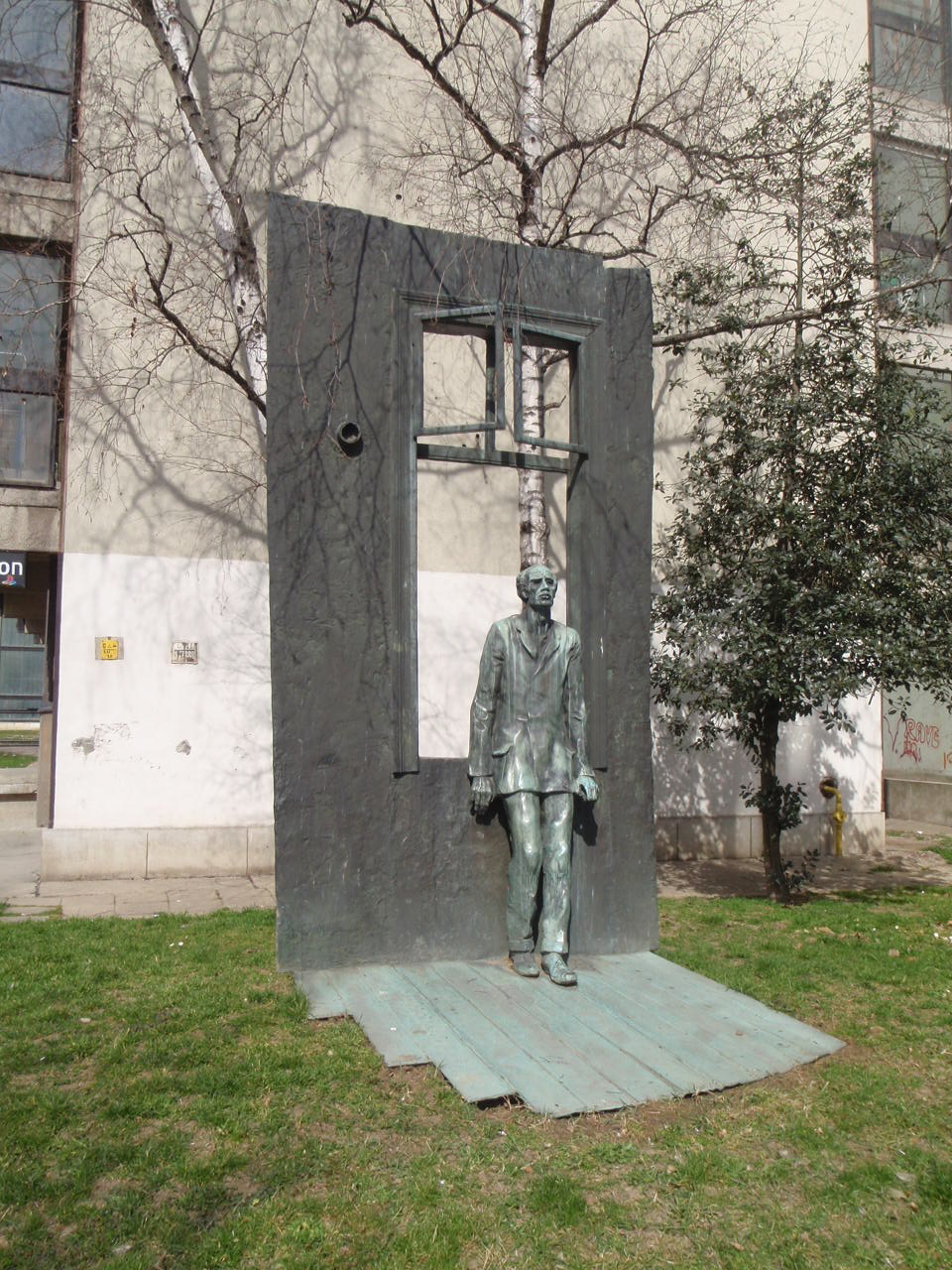
Statue of Gyula Derkovits, Szombathely (1977)

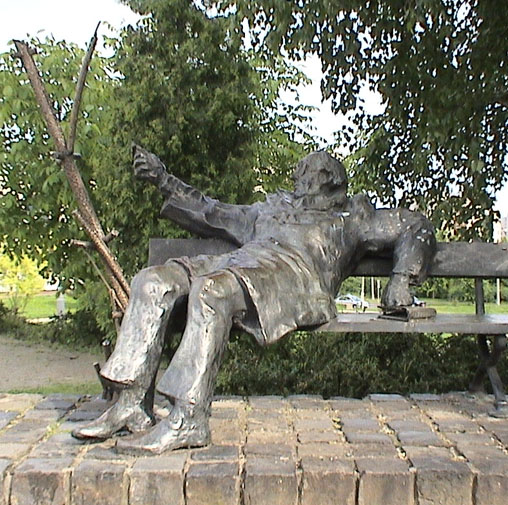
Statue of Lőrinc Szabó, Miskolc

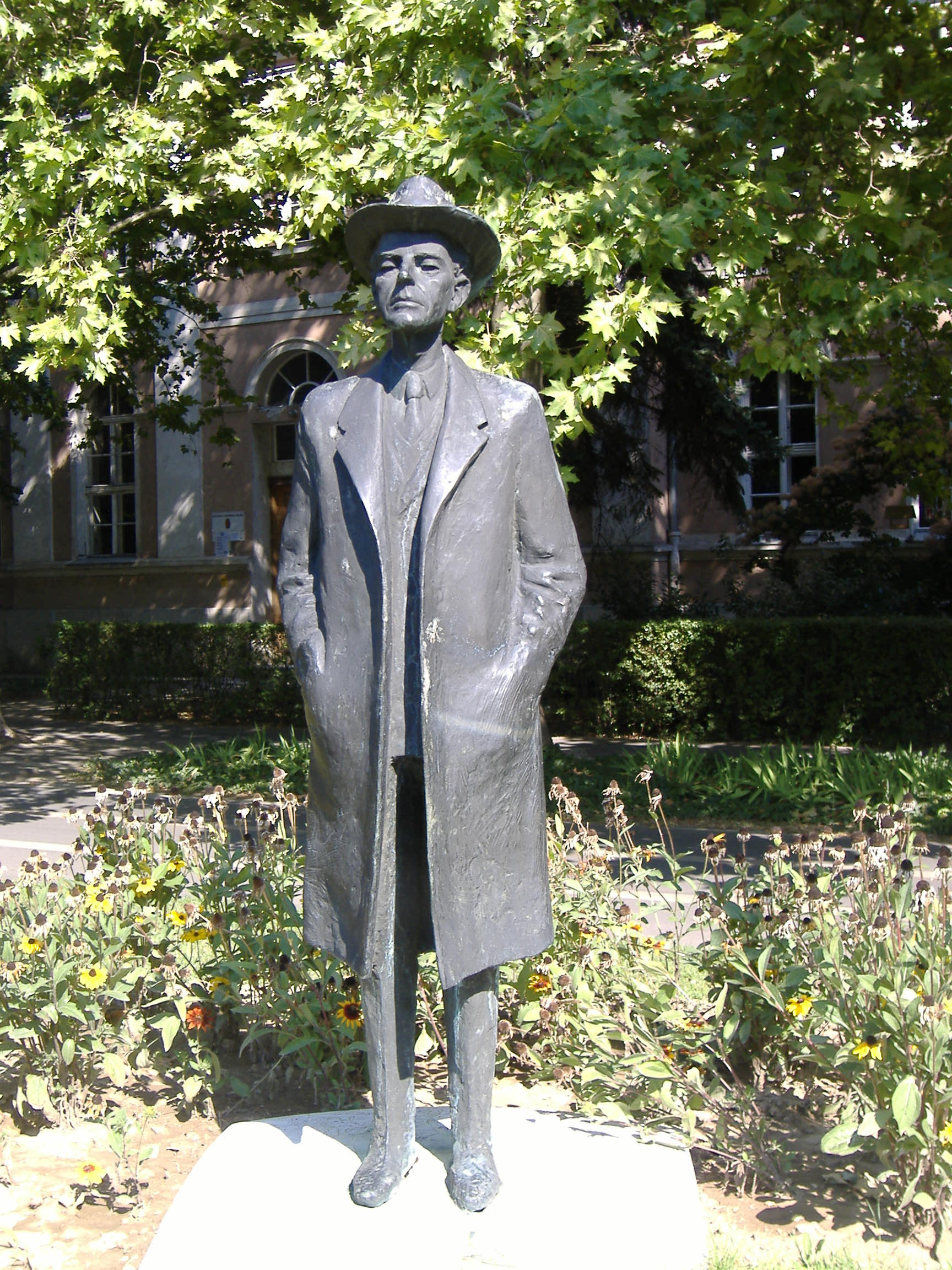
Statue of Béla Bartók, Makó

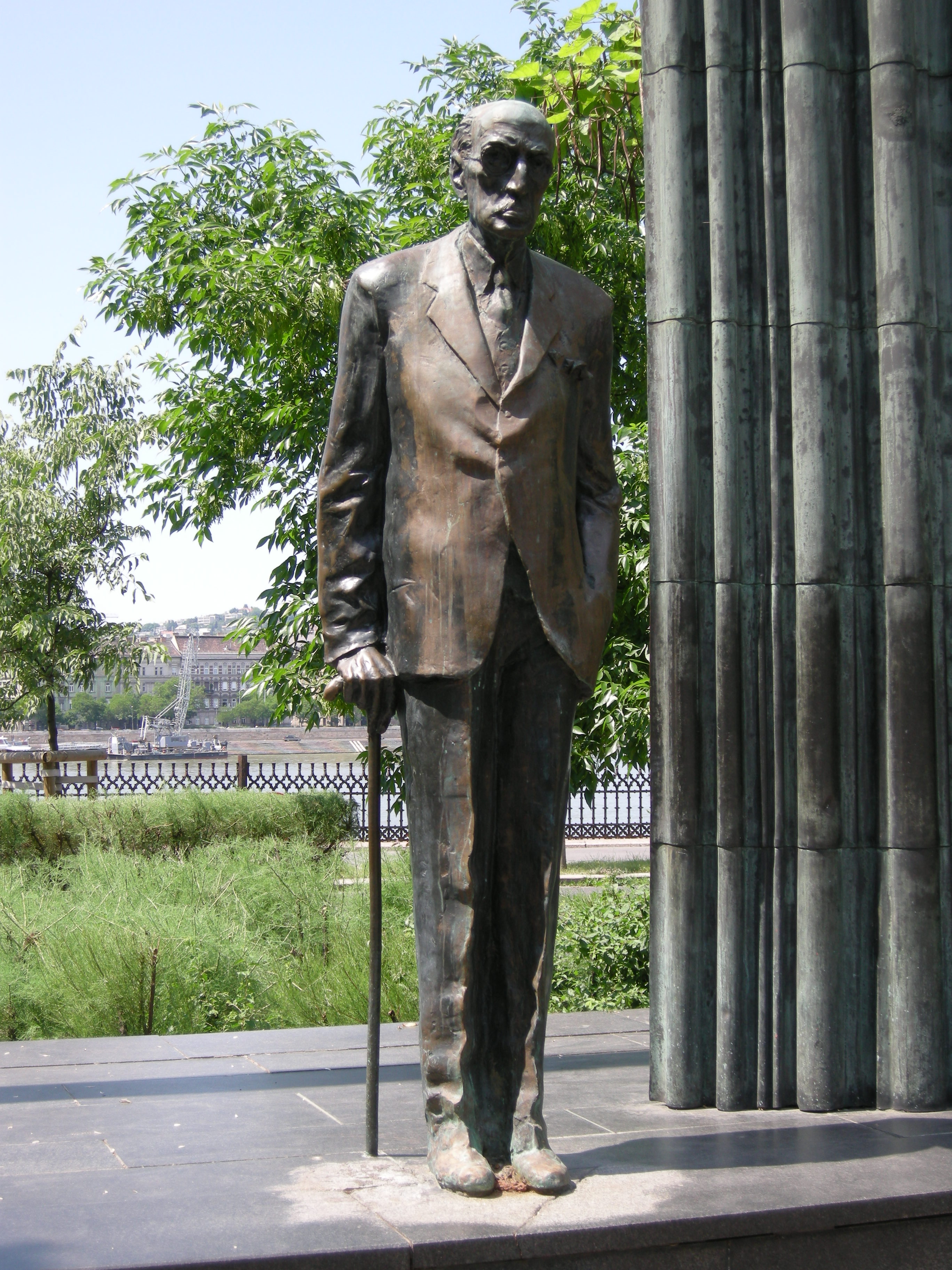
Statue of Mihály Károlyi, Budapest

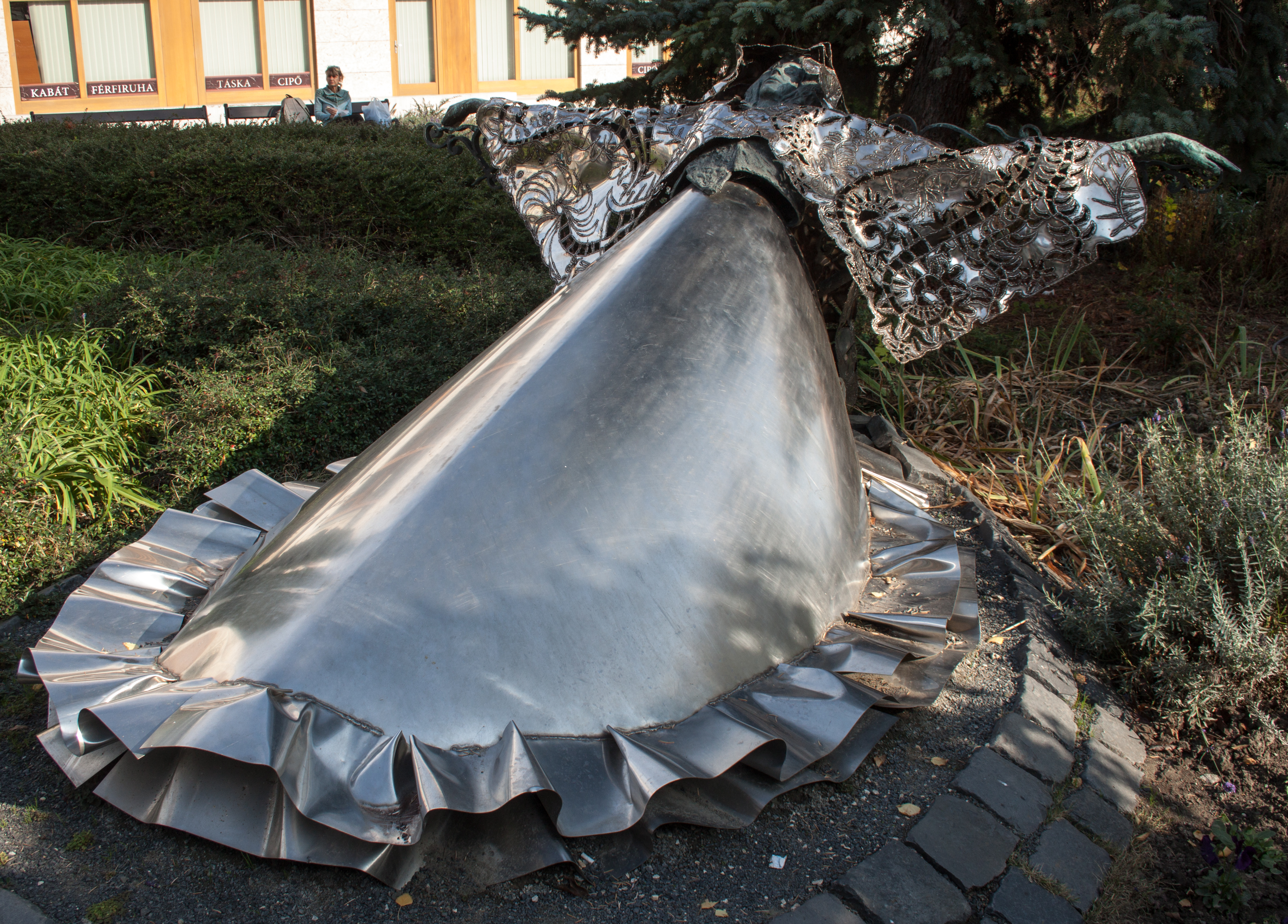
La Charogne, Siófok

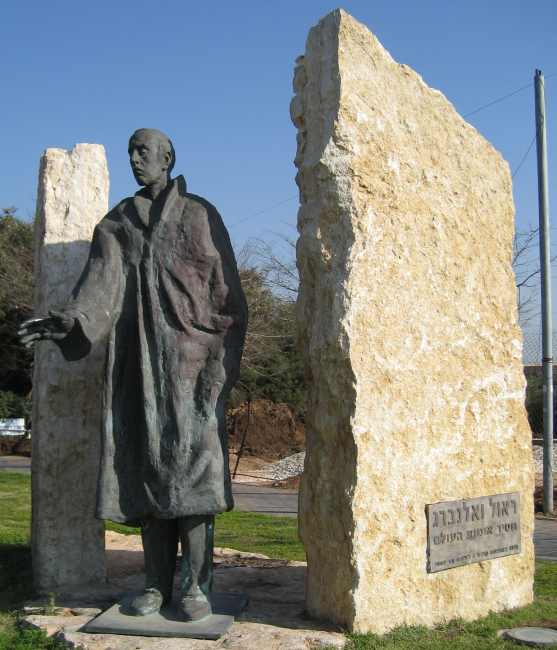
Copy of the original Raoul Wallenberg's statue
Wallenberg st., Tel-Aviv, Israel
