= List of people on the postage stamps of Hungary =

This is a list of people on stamps of Hungary.

Link

The year given is the year of issue of the first stamp depicting that person.

Data has been entered up to the end of 1960.

== A ==
- Endre Ady (1947)
- Roald Amundsen (1948)
- János Apáczai Csere (in Hungarian), (1954)
- János Arany (1932)
- Prince Árpád (1943)
- Saint Astrik (1938)

== B ==
- Endre Bajcsy-Zsilinszky (1945)
- Donát Bánki (1960)
- Béla Bartók, composer (1953)
- János Batsányi (1947)
- Ludwig van Beethoven (1960)
- Béla IV of Hungary (1942)
- Józef Bem (1950)
- Gábor Bethlen (1939)
- János Bihari (1953)
- Louis Blériot (1948)
- János Bolyai (1932)
- János Bottyán (1952)
- Antal Budai Nagy (1947)
- Lord Byron (1948)

== C ==
- Frédéric Chopin, composer (1956)
- Christopher Columbus (1948)
- Prince Csaba (1940)
- Mihály Csokonai Vitéz (1955)

== D ==
- János Damjanich (1952)
- Leonardo da Vinci (1952)
- Ferenc Deák (1932)
- György Dózsa (1919)

== E ==
- Ilona Edelsheim-Gyulai (in Hungarian), widow of István Horthy (1942)
- Thomas Edison (1948)
- George Enescu, composer (2006)
- Friedrich Engels (1919)
- Loránd Eötvös (1932)
- Ferenc Erkel, composer (1953)
- Saint Erzsébet (1932)
- Tamás Esze (in Hungarian), 18th century leader (1947)

== F ==
- Ferenc Rákóczi II (1935)
- Janos Ferencsik, artist (2008)
- Ferenc József I of Hungary (1871)
- Leó Frankel (1951)
- Robert Fulton (1948)
- Sándor Fürst (in Hungarian), Communist leader executed in 1932 (1945)

== G ==
- Giuseppe Garibaldi (1960)
- Gerard Sagredo (1930)
- Gisela of Hungary (1938)
- Johann Wolfgang von Goethe (1948)
- Károly Goldmark (1953)
- Artúr Görgey (1943)
- Maxim Gorky (1948)
- Johannes Gutenberg (1948)

== H ==
- András Hadik (1943)
- Kató Hámán (in Hungarian) (1960)
- István Hatvani, mathematician (1938)
- Joseph Haydn (1959)
- Ottó Herman (in Hungarian), ornithologist (1954)
- Ottó Hoffmann, "anti-Fascist martyr" (1945)
- Endre Hőgyes (in Hungarian), physician (1954)
- István Horthy (1942)
- Miklós Horthy (1930)
- Victor Hugo (1948)

== I ==
- Saint Imre (1930)
- János Irinyi (1954)
- István I of Hungary (1928)

== J ==
- Michael Jackson, musician (2009)
- János Hunyadi (1943)
- Ányos Jedlik (1954)
- Mór Jókai (1925)
- Frédéric Joliot-Curie (1960)
- Attila József (1947)

== K ==
- Lajos Kabók, "anti-Fascist martyr" (1945)
- Kálmán Kandó (1948)
- Dorottya Kanizsai (in Hungarian), historical figure from the Battle of Mohács (1944)
- Gáspár Károli (1939)
- Károly IV of Hungary (1916)
- Pál Kinizsi (1943)
- János Kiss (in Hungarian), "anti-Fascist martyr" (1945)
- Pálné Knurr, "anti-Fascist martyr" (1945)
- Zoltán Kodály (1953)
- Ferenc Kölcsey (1937)
- Anna Koltói (in Hungarian), "anti-Fascist martyr" (1945)
- Frigyes Korányi (in Hungarian), physician (1954)
- Sándor Kőrösi Csoma (1932)
- Lajos Kossuth (1932)
- Róbert Kreutz (1974)

== L ==
- Ladislaus I of Hungary (1938)
- Lajos I of Hungary (1942)
- Franz Lehár (1970) composer
- Vladimir Lenin (1947)
- Ferenc Liszt (1932)
- Zsuzsanna Lorántffy (1939)

== M ==
- Imre Madách (1932)
- Saint Margaret of Hungary (1938)
- György Maróthi, mathematician (1938)
- Ignác Martinovics (1919)
- Karl Marx (1919)
- Mátyás Hunyadi (1940)
- Maurice, Roman Catholic bishop of Pécs (1938)
- Vladimir Mayakovsky (1959)
- Illés Mónus (in Hungarian), "anti-Fascist martyr" (1945)
- Ferenc Móra (1960)
- Mihály Mosonyi (1953)
- Mihály Munkácsy (1932)

== N ==
- Imre Nagy (in Hungarian), poet and "anti-Fascist martyr" (1945)
- Jenő Nagy (in Hungarian), "anti-Fascist martyr" (1945)
- József Nagysándor (1952)

== P ==
- Géza Pattantyús-Ábrahám (in Hungarian), engineer (1960)
- Péter Pázmány (1935)
- Sándor Petőfi (1919)
- Edgar Allan Poe (1948)
- Alexander Popov (1948)
- Magdolna Purgly (1942)
- Alexander Pushkin (1949)
- Ferenc Puskás (in Hungarian), telephone pioneer and brother of Tivadar Puskás, in whose place his portrait was depicted in error (1954)

== R ==
- Mátyás Rákosi (1952)
- Ferenc Rózsa (in Hungarian), member of the Communist Party who died in prison in unclear circumstances (1945)

== S ==
- Endre Ságvári (in Hungarian), "anti-Fascist martyr" (1945)
- Imre Sallai (in Hungarian), Communist leader executed in 1932 (1945)
- György Sárközi (in Hungarian), "anti-Fascist martyr" (1945)
- Friedrich Schiller (1959)
- Zoltán Schönherz (in Hungarian), "anti-Fascist martyr" (1945)
- David Schwarz (1948)
- Ignác Semmelweis (1932)
- William Shakespeare (1948)
- Joseph Stalin (1947)
- George Stephenson (1948)
- Aurél Stromfeld (1952)
- Pope Sylvester II (1938)
- Tibor Szamuely (1959)
- István Széchenyi (1932)
- Albert Szenczi Molnár, Bible translator (1939)
- Erzsébet Szilágyi (1944)

== T ==
- Mihály Táncsics (1947)
- Vilmos Tartsay (in Hungarian), "anti-Fascist martyr" (1945)
- Károly Than (1954)
- István Tisza (1932)
- Miklós Toldi (1943)
- Leo Tolstoy (1948)
- Bucsoki István Tóth (1960)
- Lajos Tüköry (in Hungarian) (1960)
- István Türr (1960)
- Mark Twain (1948)

== U ==
None.

== V ==
- István Vági (1983)
- Ármin Vámbéry (1954)
- Giuseppe Fortunino Francesco Verdi (2013)
- Voltaire (1948)
- Mihály Vörösmarty (1937)

== W ==
- Wilhelm Richard Wagner (2013)

== X ==
None.

== Y ==
None.

== Z ==
- Ludwig Lazarus Zamenhof (1957)
- Ferdinand von Zeppelin (1948)
- Clara Zetkin (1960)
- Zita of Bourbon-Parma (1916)
- Ilona Zrínyi (1944)
- Miklós Zrínyi (1943)

== See also ==
- Postage stamps and postal history of Hungary
