= Magyarországi Bőripari Munkások Szövetsége =

Hungarian leather workers union

Magyarországi Bőripari Munkások Szövetsége ('Leather Workers Union of Hungary') was a trade union of leather and skin industry workers in Hungary. The union was founded in 1903. As of the early 1920s it was one of the largest unions in Hungary. It had some 9,000-11,000 members. The Leather Workers Union organized shoemakers, tannery workers and smaller leather trades, whereas furriers and bag makers were organized in other separate unions.

The Communist Party of Hungary had a strong influence within the union, and as of 1924 the leftists managed to take control of the First Budapest Shoemakers Section (which, with its 5,000 members, accounted for roughly half of the national union membership). The growth of communist influence was resisted by the national union leadership. The division in the union became more acute in 1925, as many shoemakers joined the Socialist Workers Party of Hungary. The right-wing union leadership, led by János Hubai, attacked the First Budapest Shoemakers Section in an article and resolution, to which the First Budapest Shoemakers Section responded by reaffirming its revolutionary commitment and invited István Vági as a speaker. In September 1925, following a police raid against the underground Communist Party leadership in which leaders of the shoemakers were among the arrested, the Hubai-led right-wing leadership of the union suspended the autonomy of the First Budapest Shoemakers Section, expelled their leaders from union and published names of alleged communist leaders in the trade union press. Hubai and his group seized control over the First Budapest Shoemakers Section office with help of the police. In response shoemakers deserted the Leather Workers Union en masse. Membership declined from 8,990 in 1924 to 3,009 in 1926.

In 1940 János Katona became chairman of the union. In 1945, the union was replaced by the Magyar Bőripari Munkások Országos Szabad Szakszervezete ('Hungarian Leather Workers National Free Trade Union').
