= Stalin Monument (Budapest) =

Coordinates: 47.5114°N 19.0814°E

- Sztálin szobor (Hungarian)
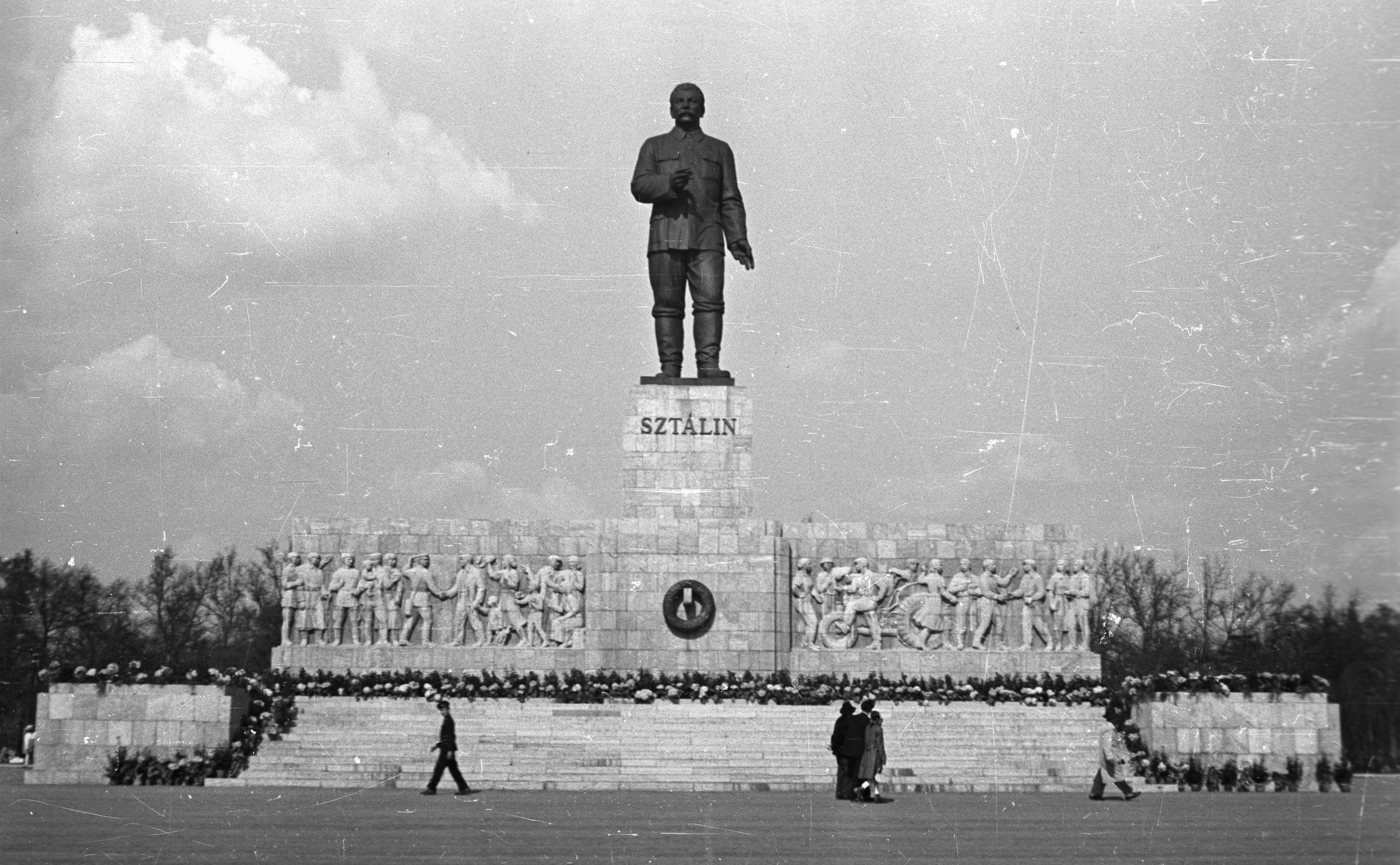
- The Stalin Monument in 1953

- Location within Budapest Location within Hungary
- Type: Socialist realism
- Location: Dózsa György út, Budapest, Hungary

History
- Unveiled: December 18, 1951
- Demolished: October 23, 1956

Site notes
- Height: Height of bronze statue: 8 meters (26 feet); Height of statue and plinth: 18 meters (59 feet); Total height of monument: 25 meters (82 feet)
- Sculptor: Sándor Mikus

The Stalin Monument (Hungarian: Sztálin szobor, pronounced [ˈstaːlin ˈsobor]) was a statue of Joseph Stalin in Budapest, Hungary. Completed in December 1951 as a "gift to Joseph Stalin from the Hungarians on his seventieth birthday", it was torn down on October 23, 1956, by enraged anti-Soviet crowds during Hungary's October Revolution.

== Monument ==
The monument was erected on the edge of Városliget, the city park of Budapest. The large monument stood 25 metres tall in total. The bronze statue stood eight metres high on a four-metre high limestone base on top of a tribune eighteen metres wide. Stalin was portrayed as a speaker, standing tall and rigid with his right hand at his chest. The sides of the tribune were decorated with relief sculptures depicting the Hungarian people welcoming their leader. The Hungarian sculptor, Sándor Mikus, created the statue and was awarded the Kossuth Prize, the highest distinction that can be attained by a Hungarian artist.

== Background ==
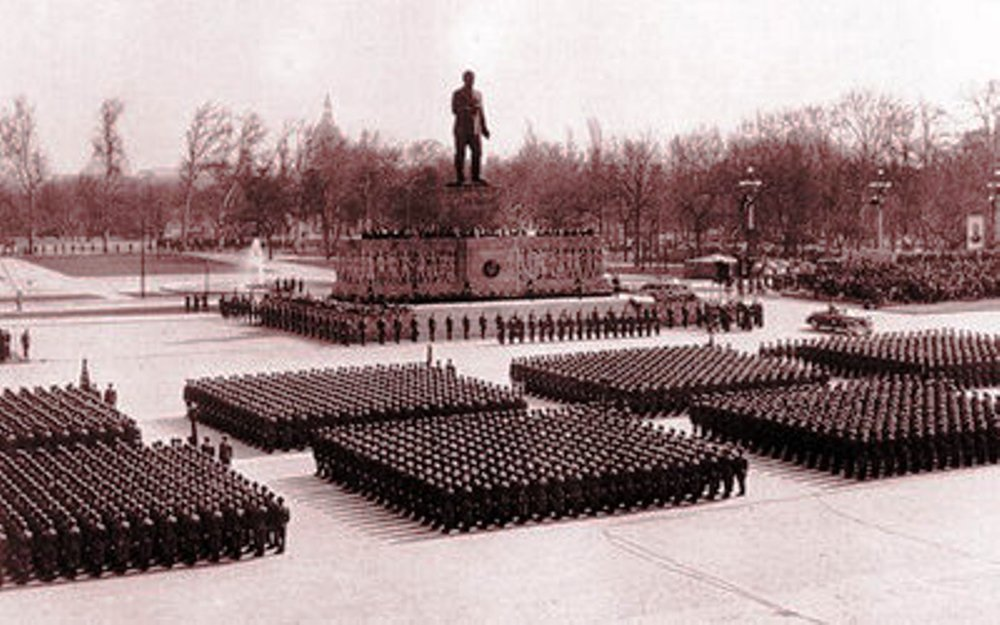
The Stalin Monument in Budapest

The Stalin monument was built during the classical period of socialist realism, the official art of Stalinism, which was a tool to instill the ideology of the Party into the people. This realistic and didactic aesthetic style celebrated the hard working proletariat and especially the cult of personality surrounding figures like Vladimir Lenin, Stalin and other Eastern European Communist leaders.

Stalin statues sprang up everywhere in Eastern Europe from the 1930s to the 1950s. They were cult objects that demonstrated the almost mystical powers of Stalin. Upon the completion of the Stalin statue, a journalist in Budapest said:

Stalin was with us earlier; now he will be with us even more. He will watch over our work, and his smile will show us the way. I have been told that in Moscow it is customary to pay a visit to Comrade Lenin in Red Square before beginning, or after finishing, an important task, either to report or to ask his advice. Undoubtedly the same will occur here with the statue of Comrade Stalin.

The monument not only demonstrated Stalin's power, but the power of the Hungarian Working People's Party as well. Directly across from Stalin's monument was MÉMOSZ, the house of the builder's union, condemned for its modernist architecture influenced by the West.

After the death of Stalin in 1953, Socialist Realism went into decline, in connection with the political changes initiated by Nikita Khrushchev in 1956 at the 20th Congress of the Communist Party of the Soviet Union, when he denounced Stalin's cult of personality.

== Destruction ==
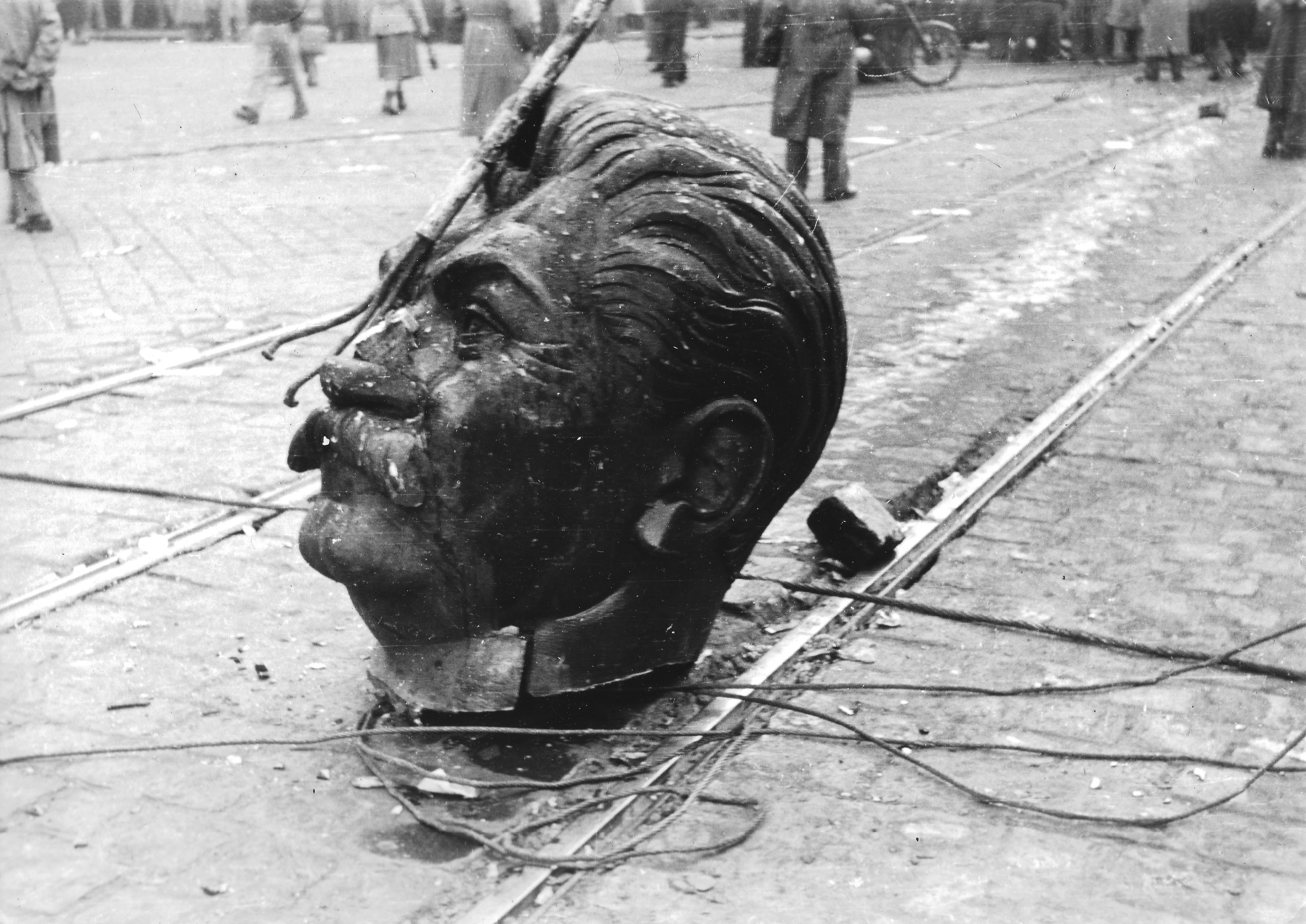
Badly-damaged head of the statue sitting on Grand Boulevard.

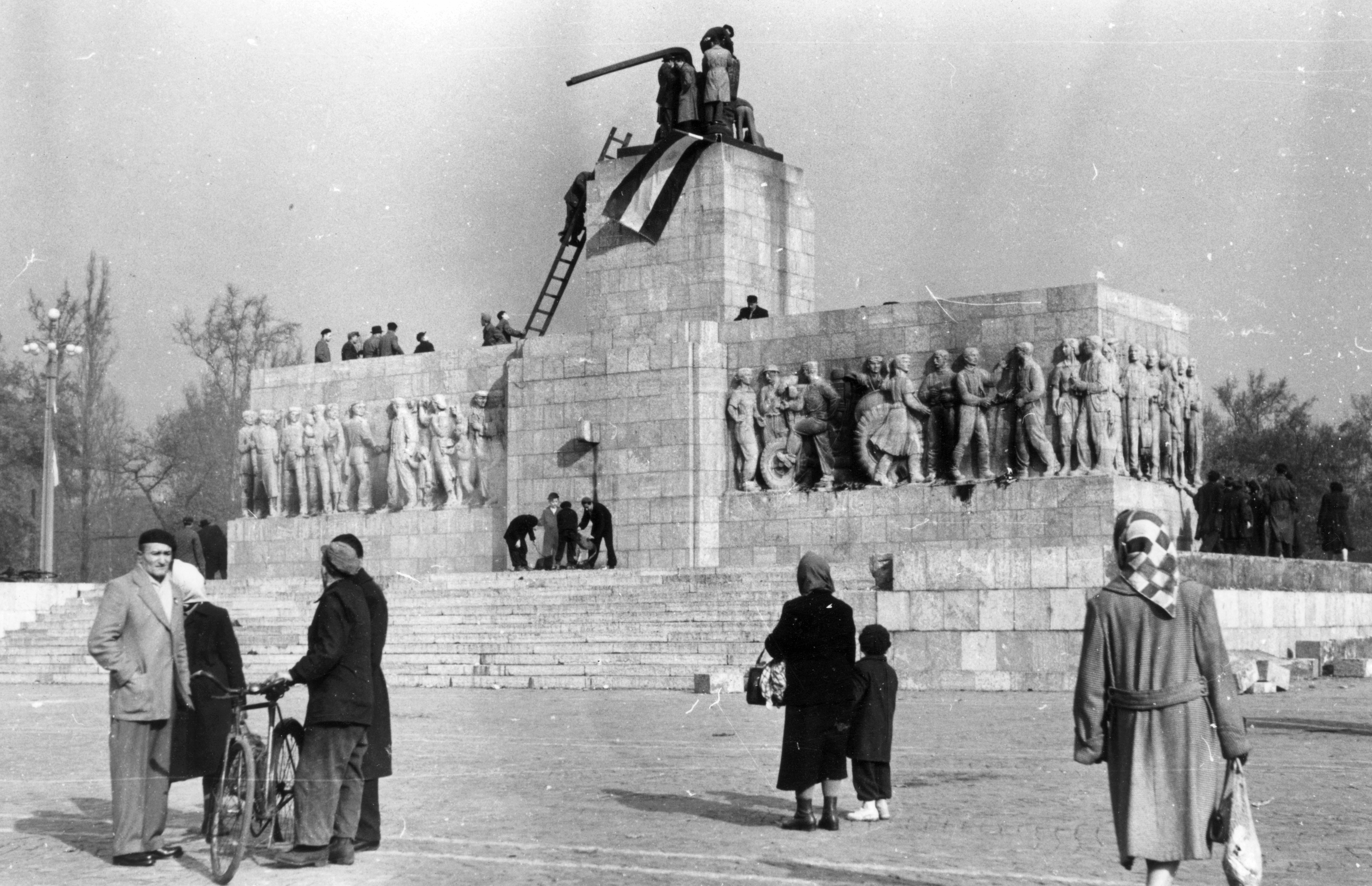
The remains of the monument after its destruction in 1956.

On October 23, 1956, around two hundred thousand Hungarians gathered in Budapest to demonstrate in sympathy for the Poles who had just gained political reform during the Polish October. The Hungarians broadcast sixteen demands over the radio, one of them being the dismantling of Stalin's statue. A hundred thousand Hungarian revolutionaries demolished the Stalin statue, leaving only his boots, in which they planted a Hungarian flag. The bronze inscribed name of the Hungarians' leader, teacher and "best friend" was ripped off from the pedestal. Before the toppling of the statue, someone had placed a sign over Stalin's mouth that read "RUSSIANS, WHEN YOU RUN AWAY DON'T LEAVE ME BEHIND!" The revolutionaries chanted "Russia go home!" while pulling down the statue. "W.C." and other insulting remarks were scrawled over the fragmented parts of the statue.

The account of the incident by Sándor Kopácsi, head of Budapest's police: "[The demonstrators] placed ... a thick steel rope around the neck of the 25-metre tall Stalin's statue while other people, arriving in trucks with oxygen cylinders and metal cutting blowpipes, were setting to work on the statue's bronze shoes. ... An hour later the statue fell down from its pedestal."

== Present ==
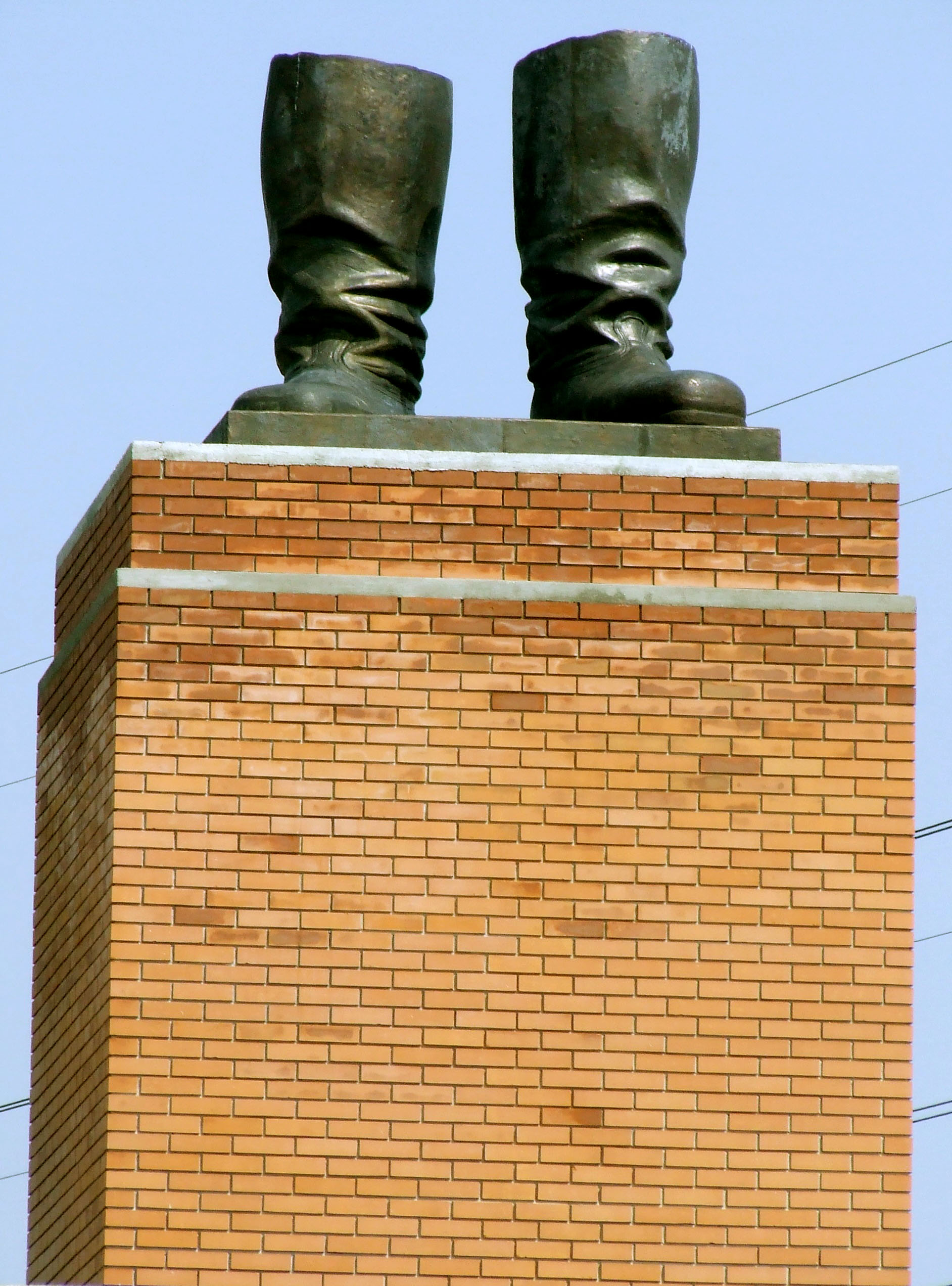
"Stalin's boots", Memento Park

The site of the former Stalin Monument is now occupied by the Monument of the 1956 Revolution, completed in 2006 for the 50th anniversary of the historic event.

A life-sized representation of the Stalin Monument was built in Budapest's Statue Park with the broken bronze boots on top of the pedestal in 2006. This is not an accurate copy of the original but only an artistic recreation by sculptor Ákos Eleőd.

== See also ==
- History of Hungary
- Hungarian Revolution of 1956
- On the Cult of Personality and Its Consequences
- Polish October
- Socialist realism
- Stalin Monument (Prague)
- Stalinism

== Bibliography ==
- Åman, Anders. Architecture and Ideology in Eastern Europe During the Stalin Era. Cambridge, MA: The MIT P, 1992.
- Bown, Matthew C. Art Under Stalin. Oxford: Phaidon P Limited, 1991. 73–86.
- Demaitre, Ann. "The Great Debate on Socialist Realism" The Modern Language Journal 50.5 (1966): 263–268.
- Sinko, Katalin. "Political Rituals: the Raising and Demolition of Monuments." Art and Society in the Age of Stalin. Ed. Peter Gyorgy and Hedvig Turai. Budapest: Corvina Bookk, 1992. 81.
- Terras, Victor. "Phenomenological Observations on the Aesthetics of Socialist Realism" The Slavic and East European Journal 22.4 (Winter, 1979), pp. 445–457.
