= Memento Park =

Open-air museum in Budapest, Hungary

Coordinates: 47°25′35″N 18°59′56″E

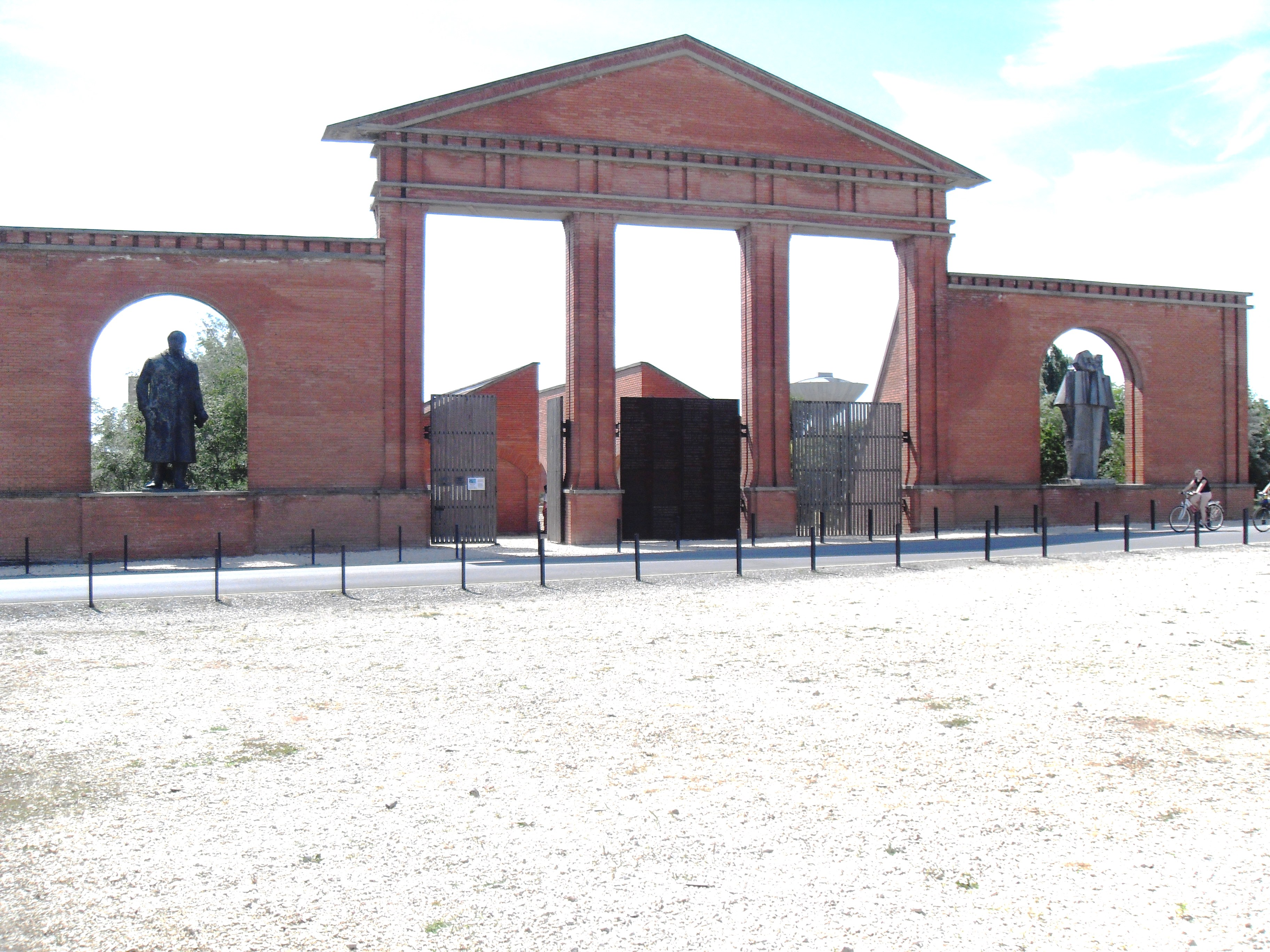
- Main entrance with Lenin, Marx and Engels
- Interactive map of Memento Park
- Type: Historical theme park
- Location: Budapest, Hungary
- Created: 1993

Memento Park (Hungarian: Szoborpark) is an open-air museum in Budapest, Hungary, dedicated to monumental statues and sculpted plaques from Hungary's Communist period (1949–1989). There are statues of Lenin, Marx, and Engels, as well as several Hungarian Communist leaders. The park was designed by Hungarian architect Ákos Eleőd, who won the competition announced by the Budapest General Assembly (Fővárosi Közgyűlés) in 1991. On public transport diagrams and other documents the park is usually shown as Memorial Park.

A quote by the architect on the project: "This park is about dictatorship. And at the same time, because it can be talked about, described, built, this park is about democracy. After all, only democracy is able to give the opportunity to let us think freely about dictatorship."

Memento Park is divided into two sections: Statue Park, officially named "A Sentence About Tyranny" Park after a poem of the same name by Gyula Illyés, and laid out as six oval sections; and Witness Square (also called "Neverwas Square"), which lies east of the main park entrance and is visible without payment. Statue Park houses 42 of the statues and monuments that were removed from Budapest after the fall of communism. Witness Square holds a replica of Stalin's Boots which became a symbol of the Hungarian Revolution of 1956, after the statue of Stalin was pulled down from its pedestal, and is flanked by two single storey timber structures housing the internal exhibition space, their design being evocative of simple internment camp buildings.

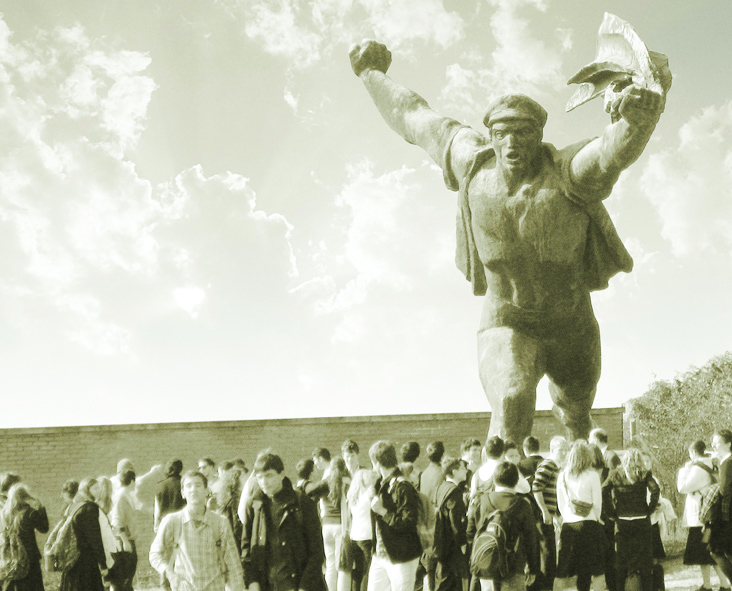
Participants of a "Red Star Tour" in the Memento Park

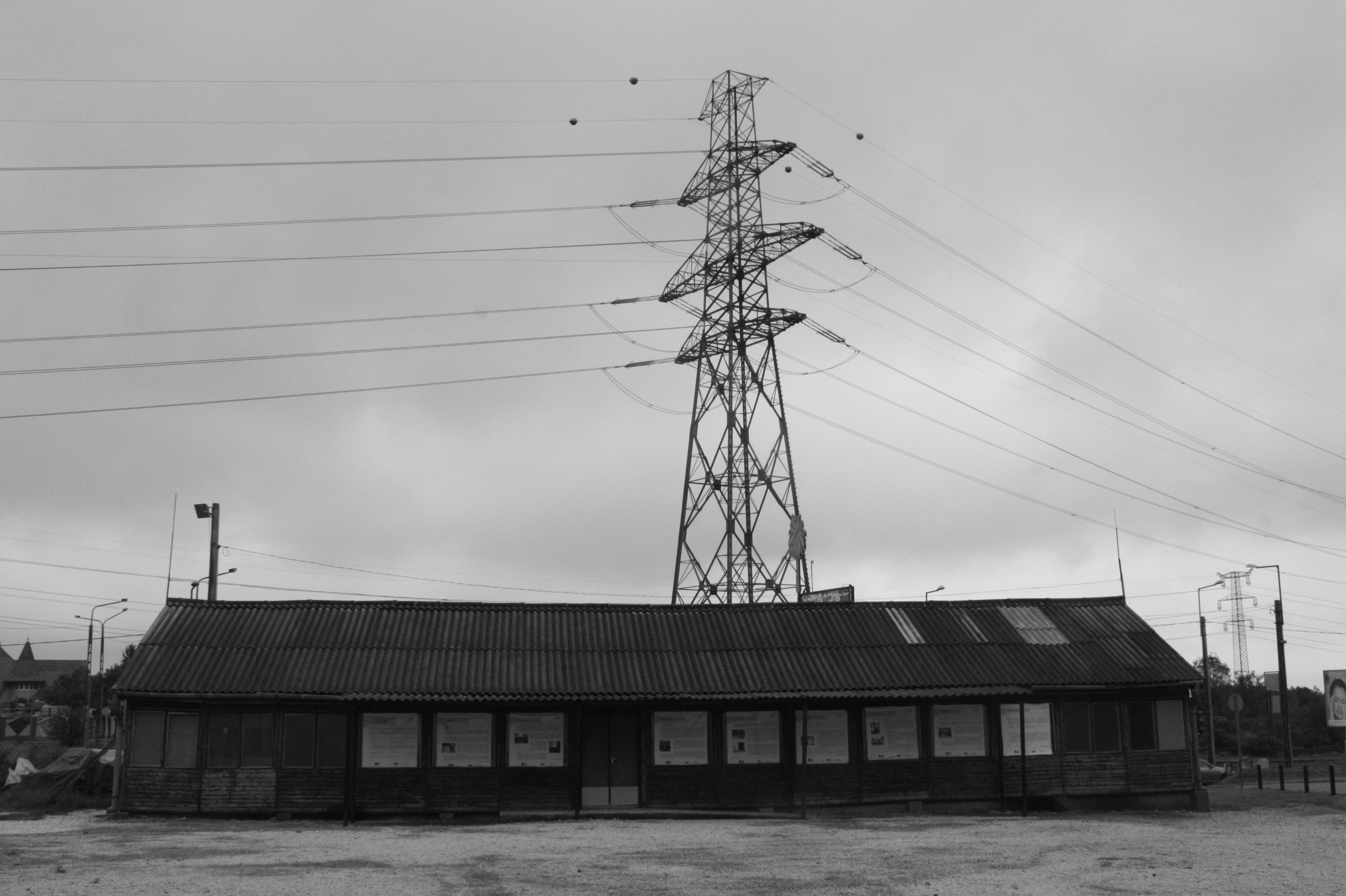
The exhibition hall in "Witness Square", Memento Park, Budapest

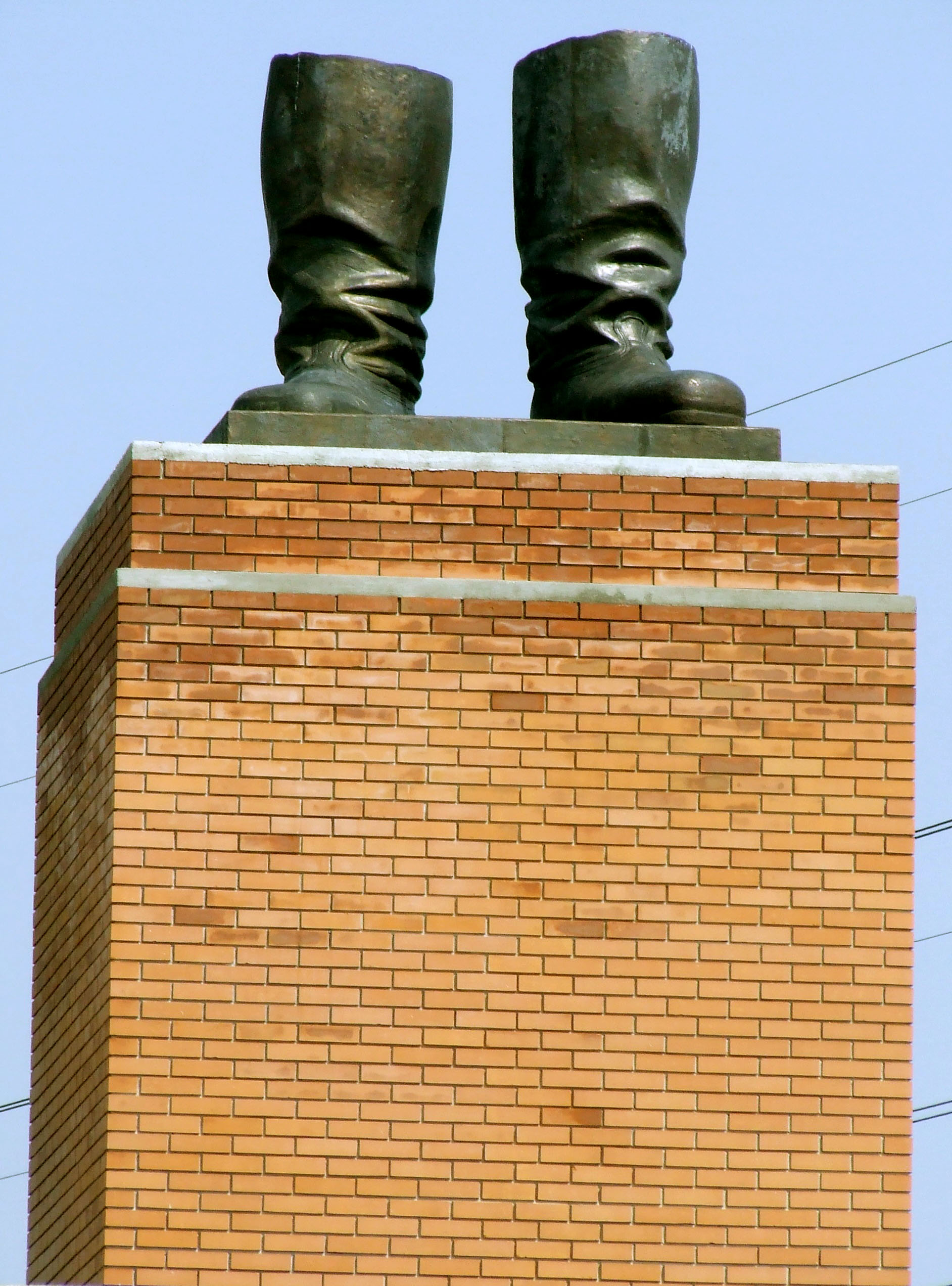
"Stalin's boots", Memento Park; replica of the remnants of Stalin Monument

== History ==
After the fall of the Communist regime in Hungary in 1989, many of the Communist statues and monuments were immediately removed. These formed the basis for the current collection of statues in the park. On 29 June 1993, the second anniversary of the withdrawal of the Soviet troops from Hungarian territory, the park celebrated a grand opening as a public outdoor museum.

In 2006, a life-sized copy of the tribune of the Stalin Monument in Budapest was built in the Statue Park with the broken bronze shoes on top of the pedestal. This is not an accurate copy of the original, but an artistic recreation by Ákos Eleőd.

In 2007, a new exhibition hall and a small movie theater were opened in the Witness Square of Memento Park. The photo exhibition called "Stalin's Boots" in the exhibition hall takes the viewer through the history of the 1956 revolution, of the political changes of 1989–1990 and of Memento Park, with both English and Hungarian captions. In the barracks-theater one can see The Life of an Agent, a documentary on the methods used by the secret police, directed by Gábor Zsigmond Papp. The film is shown in Hungarian with English subtitles.

== Sculptures, monuments and plaques ==
=== The Wall behind the Scenes ===
Image	Sculpture name (Original name)	Author	Year	Construction material	Original location
	Lenin (Lenin)	Pátzay Pál	1965	Bronze	Felvonulási tér (parallel to Dózsa György street and beside the Városliget city park)
	Karl Marx and Friedrich Engels (Marx és Engels)	Segesdi György	1971	Granite from Mauthausen	V. ker. Jászai Mari square (at the main entrance of the communist party headquarters)

=== Endless Parade of Liberation Monuments ===
Image	Sculpture name (Original name)	Author	Year	Construction material	Original location
	Liberation Army soldier statue (Felszabadító szovjet katona)	Zsigmond Kisfaludi Strobl	1947	Bronze	Part of the Liberation Monument at the top of the Gellért Hill
	Hungarian-Soviet Friendship Memorial (A magyar-szovjet barátság emlékműve)	Zsigmond Kisfaludi Strobl	1956	Bronze	X. Pataki square (today Szent László square)
	Liberation Monument (Felszabadulási emlékmű)	István Kiss	1971	Limestone	XIV. Thököly street 141.
	Liberation Memorial Stone (Felszabadulási emlékkő)	Unknown	1960	Stone	I. Dísz square
	Soviet Heroic Memorial (Szovjet hősi emlékmű)	László Péter	1951	Limestone	XII. Széchenyi hegy, Rege park
	Soviet-Hungarian Friendship (Szovjet-magyar barátság emlékműve)	Búza Barna	1975	Pyrogranite	X. Kőbánya-Óhegy, Barátság park
	Soviet Heroic Memorial (Szovjet hősi emlékmű)	Mikus Sándor	1970	Bronze	XVI. Rákosszentmihály, Hősök tere (Heroes' Square)
	Soviet Heroic Memorial (Felszabadulási emlékmű)	Kalló Viktor	1965	Bronze	XIII. Béke square
	Soviet Heroic Memorial (Szovjet Hősi emlékmű)	Megyeri Barna	1948	Limestone	XVII. Kasztel András street

=== Endless Parade of Personalities of the Workers Movement ===
Image	Sculpture name (Original name)	Author	Year	Construction material	Original location
	Lenin Relief (Lenin-emléktábla)	Szabó Iván	1970	Bronze	VII. Lenin square (today Erzsébet square)
	Georgi Dimitrov bust (Dimitrov mellszobor)	Jordan Kracsmarov	1954	Bronze	V. Dimitrov square (today Fővám square) 1954–1983; II. Dimitrov road (today Máraremetei road) 1984–1991
	Georgi Dimitrov statue (Dimitrov szobor)	Valentin Sztarcsev	1983	Bronze	V. Dimitrov square (today Fővám square)
	Béla Kun, Jenő Landler and Tibor Szamuely Memorial (Munkásmozgalmi harcosok emlékműve)	Olcsai-Kiss Zoltán, Herczeg Klára, Farkas Aladár	1967	Bronze	VIII. Kun Béla square (today Ludovika square)
	Lenin (Lenin)	Unknown soviet sculptor	1958	Bronze	XXI. Csepel, Vasmű (Iron Works) main entrance
	József Kalamár Bust (Kalamár József mellszobor)	Gyenes Tamás	1957	Bronze	XXI. Kalamár József street (today Szent István street)
	János Asztalos Memorial Plaque (Asztalos János emléktábla)	Nagy István János	1968	Stone	VIII. Nagyvárad square
	Róbert Kreutz Memorial Plaque (Kreutz Róbert emléktábla)	Kiss Nagy András	1977	Bronze	VIII. Asztalos János Ifjúsági Park (today Orczy Garden)
	Béla Kun Memorial Plaque (Kun Béla emléktábla)	Kalló Viktor	1989	Bronze	XXI. Tanácsház square (today Szent Imre square)
	Endre Ságvári Bust (Ságvári Endre mellszobor)	Baksa Soós György	1949	Bronze	V. Városház street 9–11.
	Árpád Szakasits bust (Szakasits Árpád szobra)	Marton László	1988	Bronze	XI. Szakasits Árpád street (today Etele street)
	Béla Kun Memorial (Kun Béla emlékmű)	Imre Varga	1986	Bronze, chromium, copper	I. Vérmező-park
	Ferenc Münnich statue (Münnich Ferenc szobra)	István Kiss	1986	Bronze	V. Néphadsereg square (today Honvéd square)
	Ede Chlepkó Bust (Chlepkó Ede mellszobor)	Szabó György	1980	Bronze	XIX. Chlepkó Ede square (today Ötvenhatosok tere, roughly translated square of the heroes of 1956)
	Kálmán Turner Memorial Plaque (Turner Kálmán emléktábla)	Unknown	1959	Marble	IX. Soroksári street
	Kató Hámán Memorial Plaque (Hámán Kató emléktábla)	Unknown	1959	Marble	IX. Mester street 59.

=== Unending Promenade of Worker's Movement Concepts ===
Image	Sculpture name (Original name)	Author	Year	Construction material	Original location
	Workers' and Soldiers' Council Memorial Plaque (A Munkás és Katonatanács emléktáblája)	Unknown	1959	Marble	I. Szentháromság street 2.
	The Display of the Worker's Militia Monument (Munkásőr-demonstráció emléktábla)	Kiss Nagy András	1973	Bronze	VI. November 7 square (today Oktogon) 2.
	Workers' Movement Memorial (Munkásmozgalmi emlékmű)	István Kiss	1976	Steel	II. Hűvösvölgy
	The Hungarian Fighters' in the Spanish International Brigades' Memorial (A spanyolországi nemzetközi brigádok magyar harcosainak emlékműve)	Makrisz Agamemnon	1968	Bronze and stone	V. Néphadsereg square (today Honvéd square)
	Republic of Councils Monument (Tanácsköztársasági emlékmű)	István Kiss	1969	Bronze	XIV. Dózsa György street (Felvonulási tér)
	The Republic of Councils Pioneers Memorial Plaque (Béke őrei dombormű)	Ambrózi Sándor and Stöckert Károly	1953	Stone	II. Pasaréti street 191–193.
	Hungarian Communist Party Memorial Plaque (KMP ferencvárosi szervezet emléktábla)	Unknown	1959	Marble	IX. Soroksári street
	Hungarian Communist Party Printing House Memorial Plaque (KMP Nyomda emléktábla)	Unknown	1955	Marble	IX. Ráday street 53.
	The Heroes of Peoples' Power Memorial (A néphatalom hőseinek emlékhelye)	Kalló Viktor	1983	Stone	VIII. Köztársaság (Republic) square
	Martyrs Monument (Az ellenforradalom mártírjainak emlékműve)	Kalló Viktor	1960	Stone	VIII. Köztársaság square
	The Buda Volunteers Regiment Memorial (A Budai Önkéntes Ezred emlékműve)	Mészáros Mihály	1975	Concrete	II. Tárogató street
	Ostapenko (Osztapenkó)	Kerényi Jenő	1951	Bronze	XI. Budaörsi út – Balatoni út
	Captain Steinmetz (Steinmetz kapitány)	Mikus Sándor	1958	Bronze	XVIII. Vöröshadsereg street (today Üllői street)

== See also ==
- The Chiang Kai-shek Statues in Taiwan
- Fallen Monument Park, the Russian equivalent.
- Grūtas Park, in Lithuania, known colloquially as "Stalin World"
- List of Sculpture Parks
- Memento Park: A Novel by Mark Sarvas
