= Soma Orlai Petrich =

Hungarian painter (1822–1880)

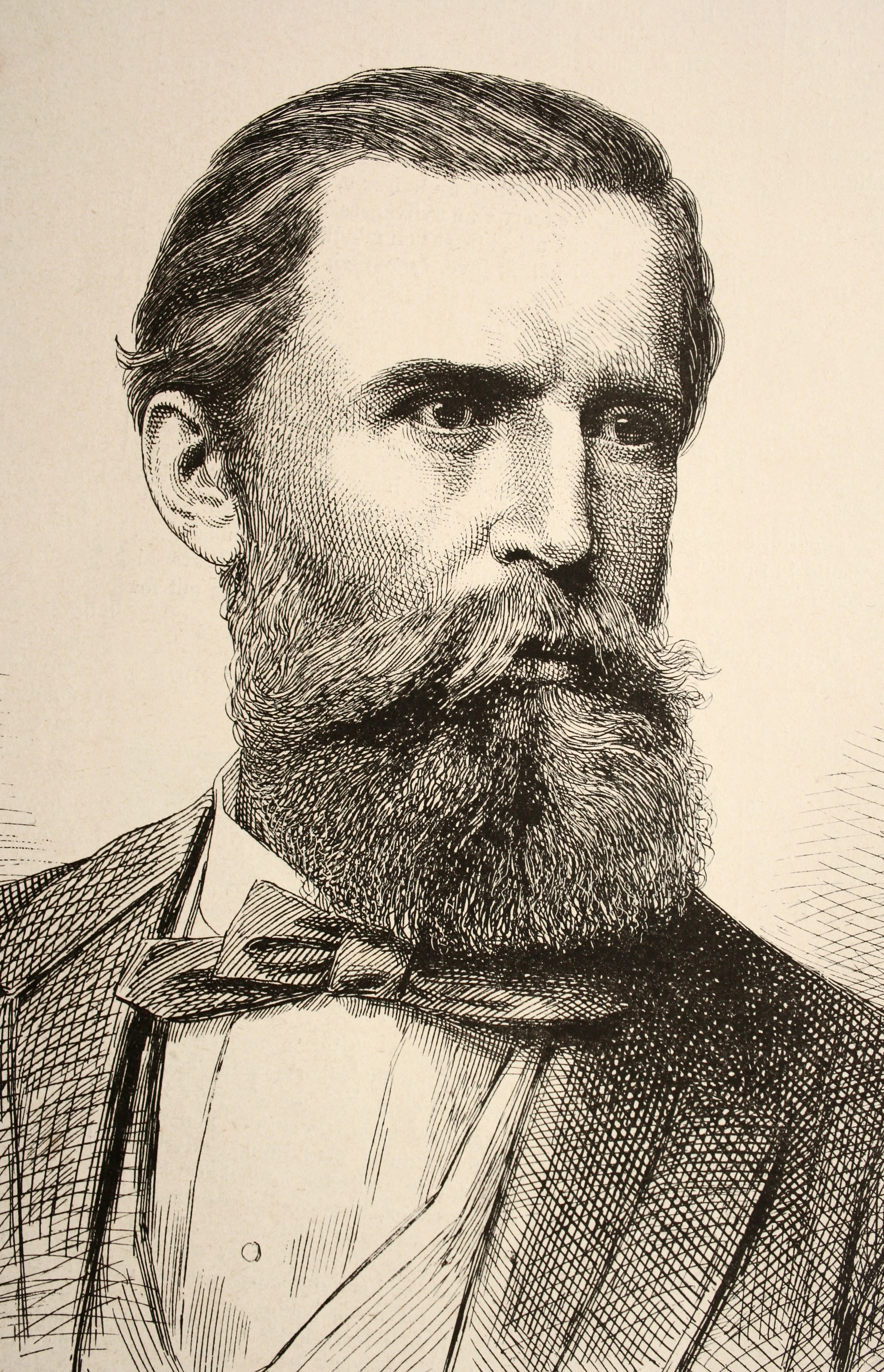
- Portrait in 1878
- Born: October 22, 1822; Mezobereny, Hungary
- Died: June 5, 1880 (aged 57); Budapest
- Resting place: Kerepes Cemetery, Budapest
- Style: Historical Scenes, Portraits

Soma Orlai Petrich, aka Soma Orlay-Petrich (October 22, 1822, Mezőberény - June 5, 1880, Budapest) was a Hungarian painter famous for his historical paintings and portraits.

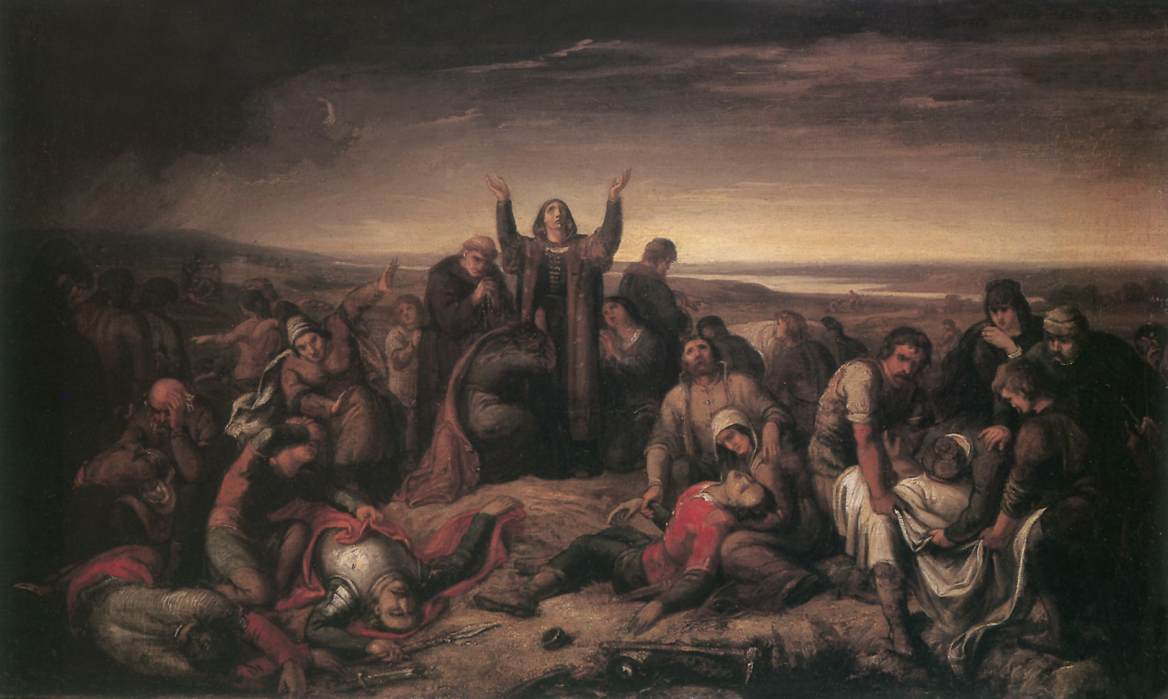
Dorottya Kanizsai (1490-?) Gathering the Dead after the Battle at Mohács (1860s)

Petrich was born to a staunchly evangelical Serbian father and Hungarian mother Karolina Salkovics (whose portrait is one of his best known works, see below) in the highland border town of Mezőberény. He studied in Drávaszarvas, Croatia and Sopron before taking a law degree in Pápa Reformed College. There, he studied with his second cousin, national hero and poet Sándor Petőfi, and the two travelled together widely. After painting his cousin's parents, Petrich's obvious talent caused him to abandon his original dream of becoming a writer, and he began studying at Jakab Marastoni art school in 1846. He then attended Ferdinand Georg Waldmüller's school in Vienna beginning in 1847, studied with Wilhelm von Kaulbach in Munich in 1850, and also took instruction in Rome and Paris.

He often painted historical themes and in his lithographs he portrayed experiences during the war of independence. Arguably his most famous painting, "The Discovery of Louis II [of Hungary]'s Body" (1851) inspired others to paint on the same subject, including Bertalan Székely a decade later.

He was also a popular portraitist, and made a good living in Debrecen and Vienna before settling in Pest following the founding of its permanent collection. By 1861, he was on the board of directors of the National Hungarian Society of Fine Arts with Miklós Barabás, Jenő Zichy, and Than Mór. Though he suffered from seizures his whole life, he produced at least one major work from 1851 until Coriolanus in 1869.

== Selected works ==
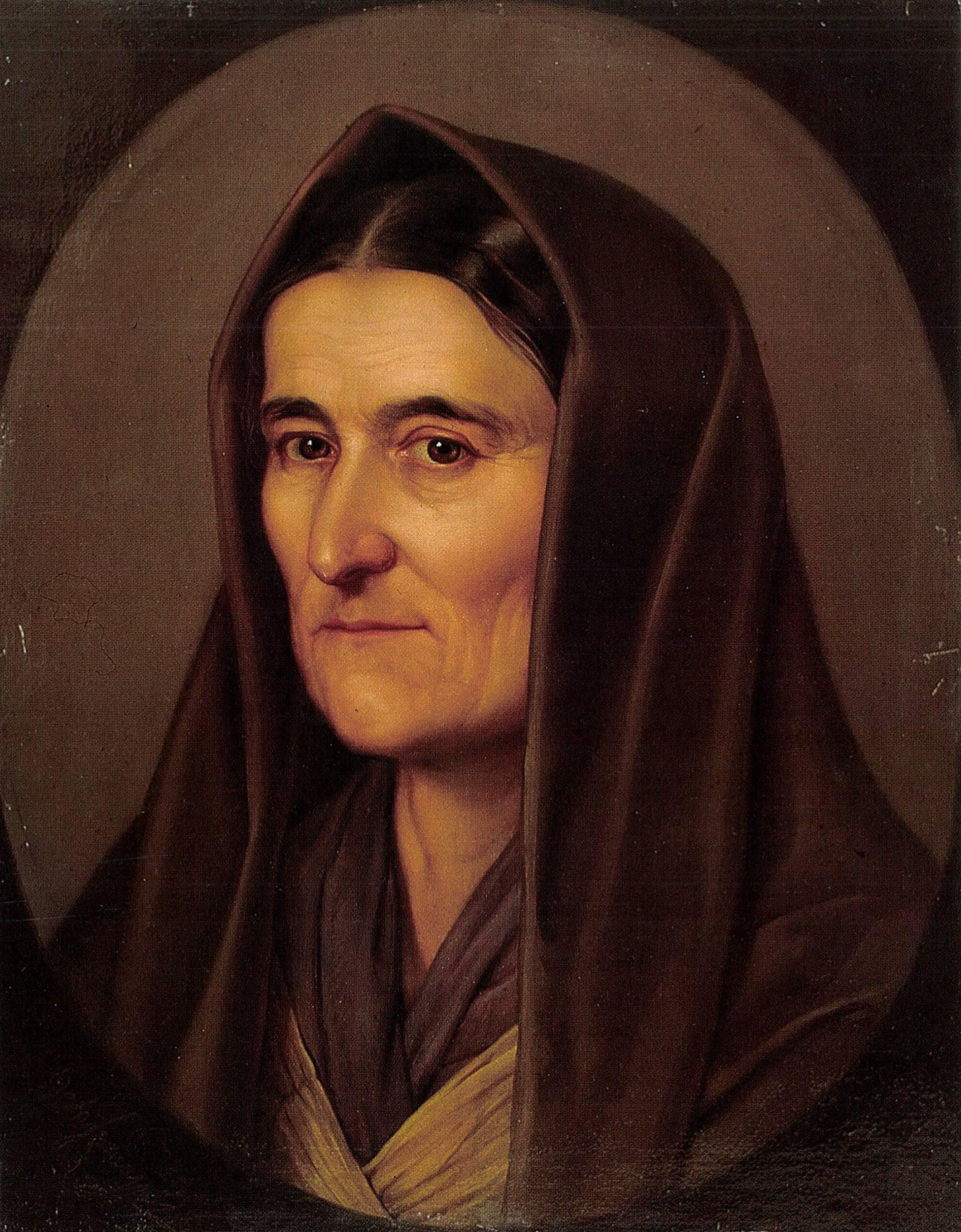
Mária Hrúz [mother of Sándor Petőfi] (c. 1845), Petőfi Literary Museum

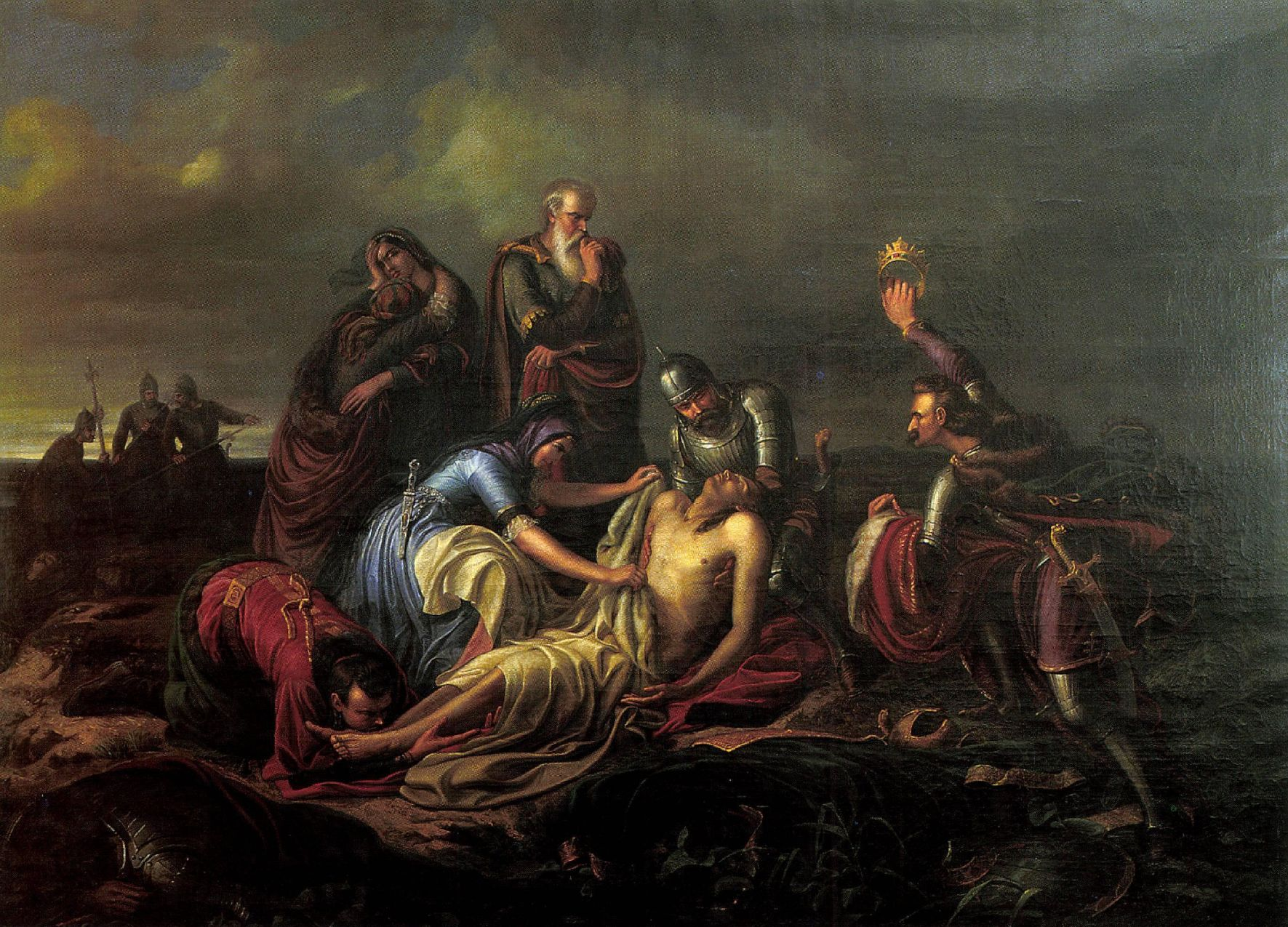
Discovery of King Louis II's Body (1851), Library of the Reformed College, Debrecen

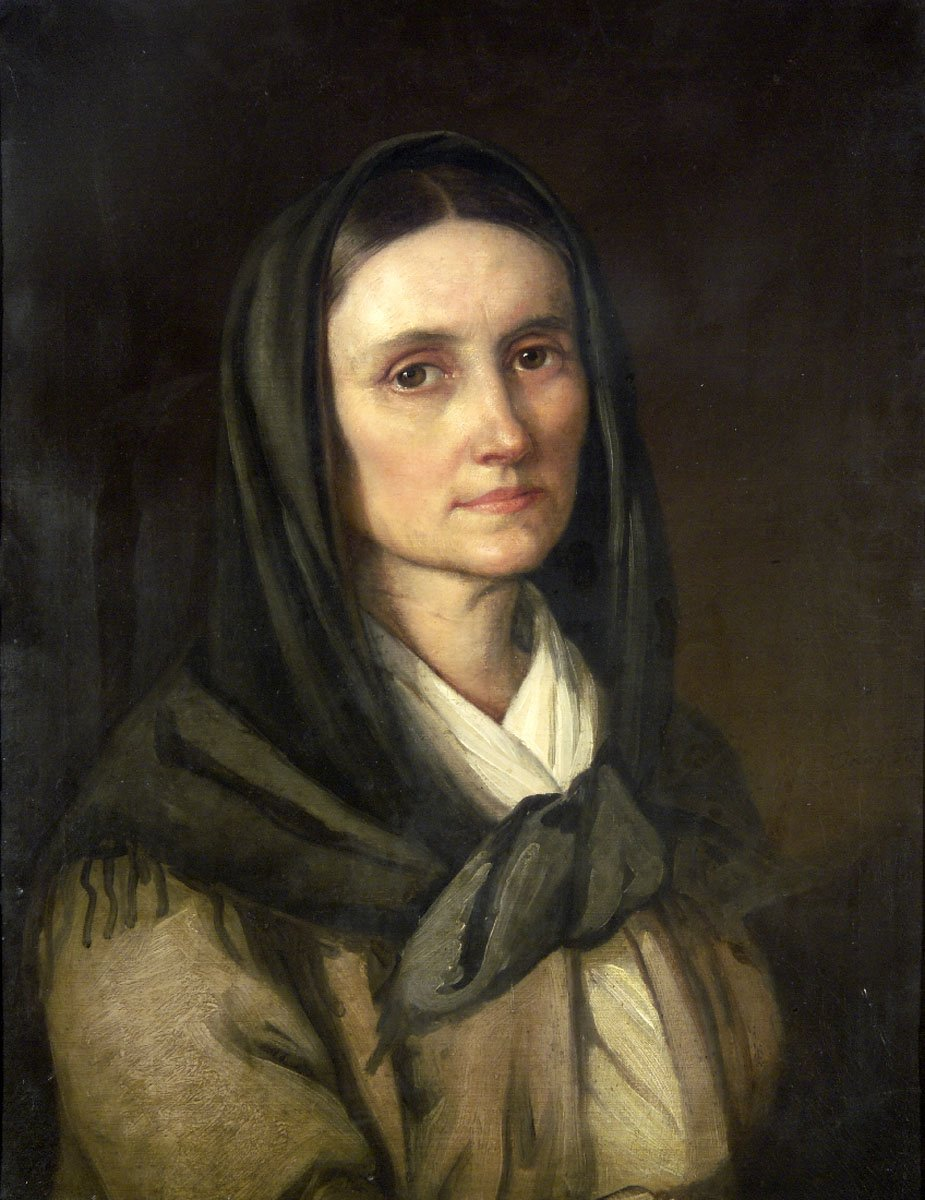
Artist's Mother (early 1850s), Hungarian National Museum

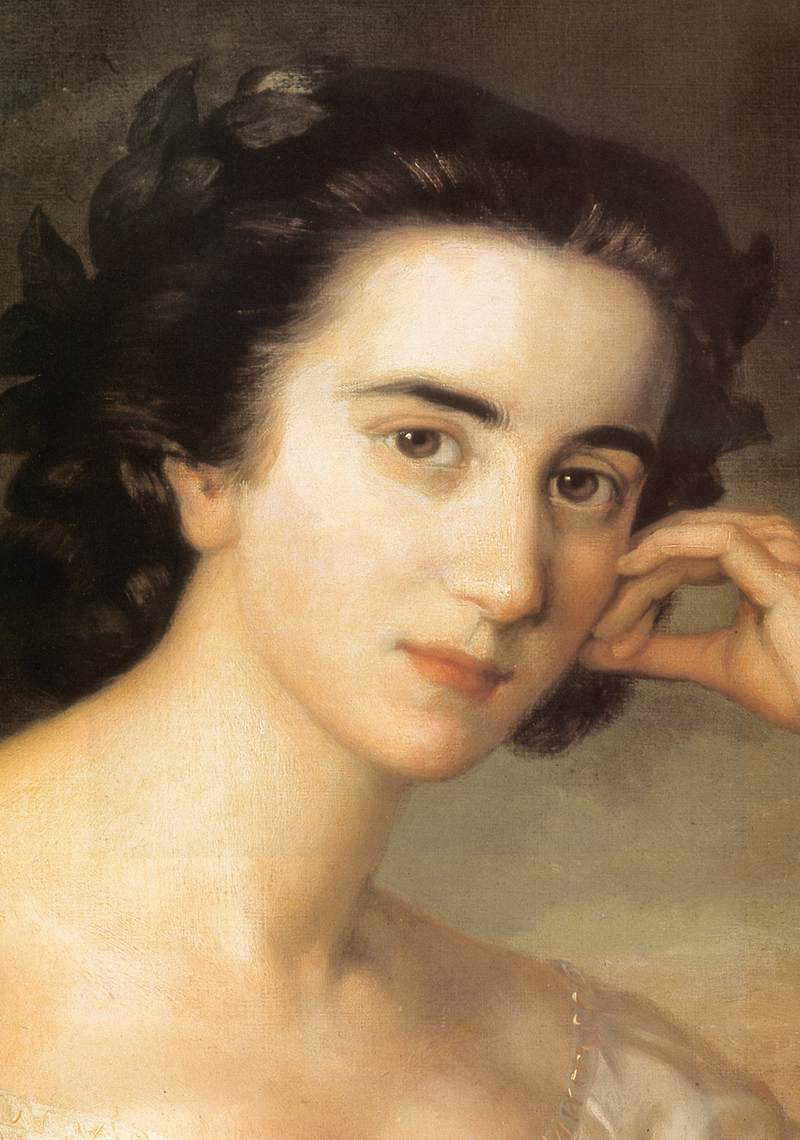
Detail of Sappho (c. 1860), Hungarian National Museum

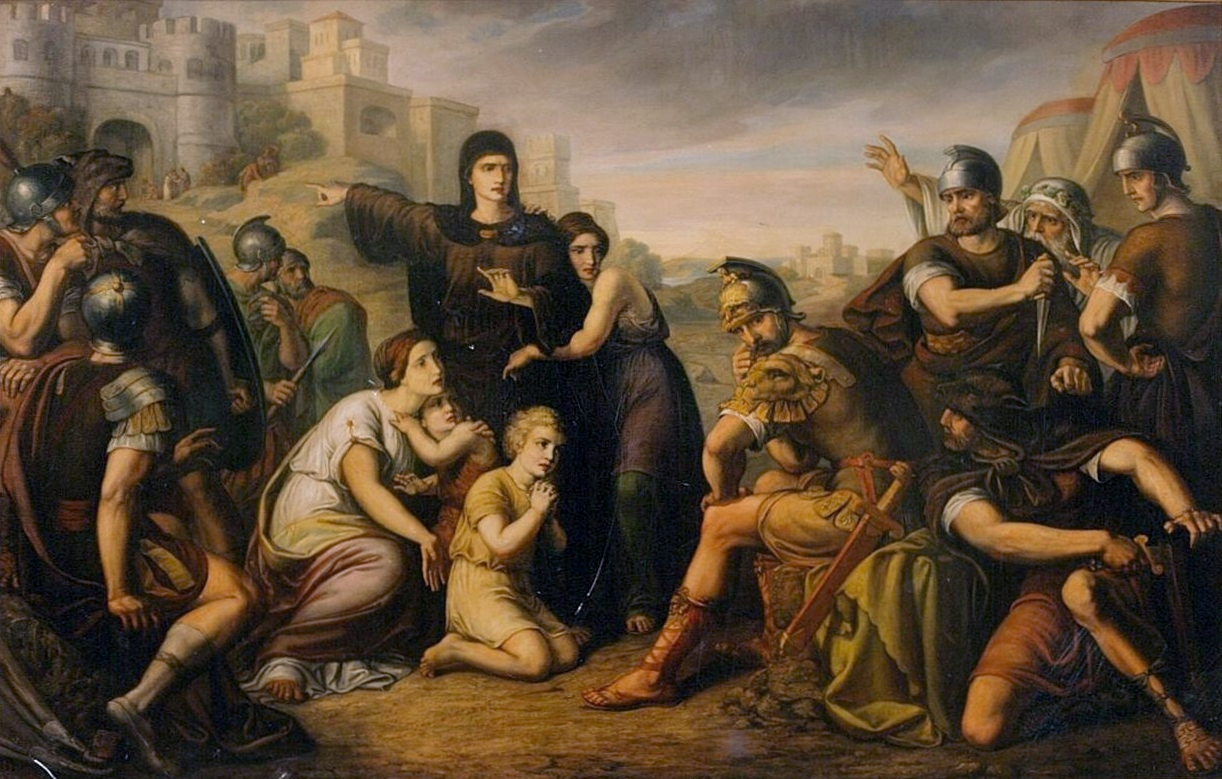
Coriolanus (1869), Munkácsy Mihály Museum, Békéscsaba
