= Róbert Kreutz =

Hungarian communist (1923–1944)

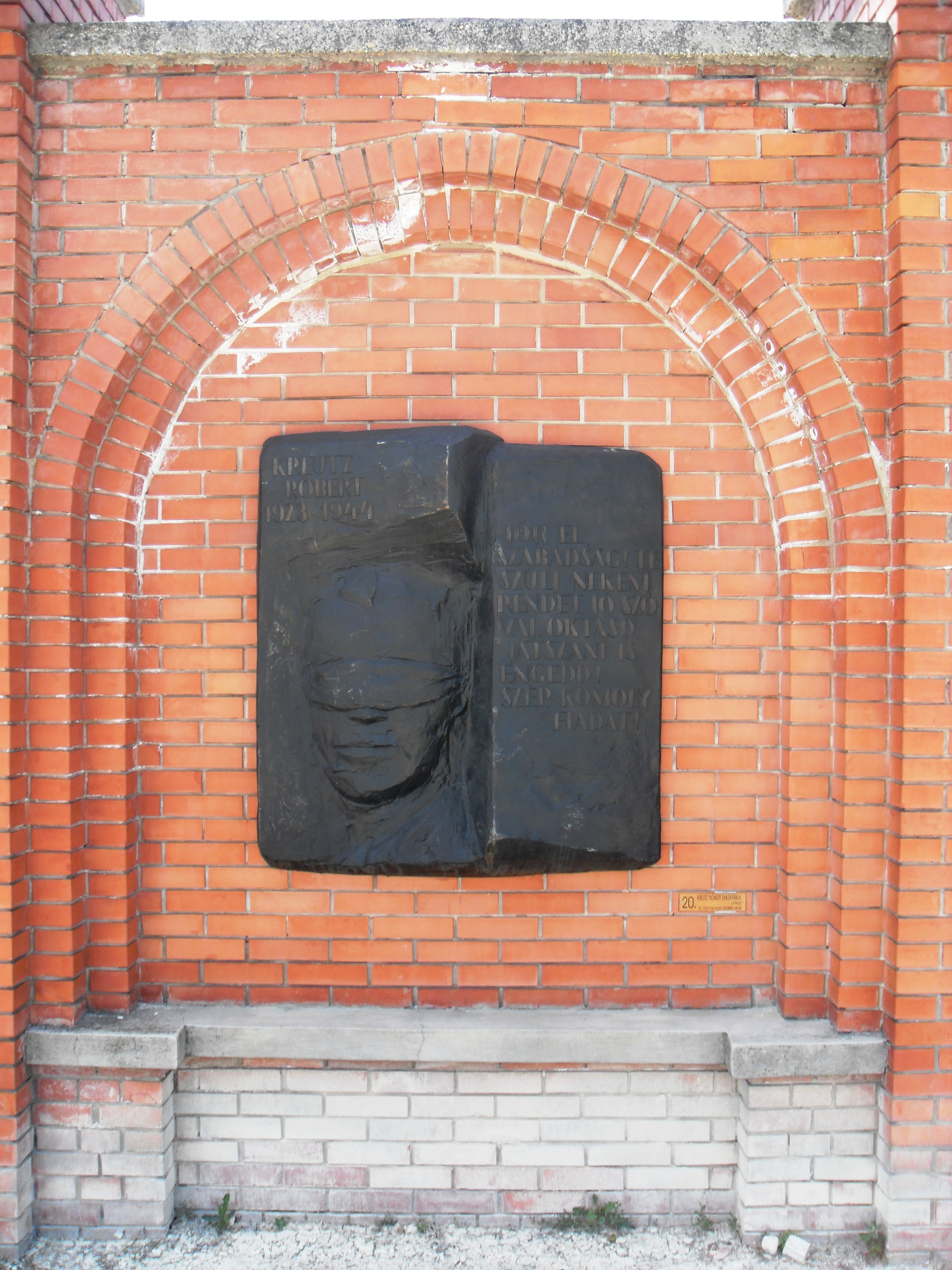
Robert Kreutz Memorial Plaque at Memento Park (Kiss Nagy Andras, 1977)

Róbert Kreutz (3 January 1923 – 24 December 1944) was a Hungarian Communist born in Budapest. He became a steelworker, working in the Manfréd Weiss Steel and Metal Works and participated in the youth movement during the 1930s. He was active in the resistance movement against Germans in World War II and was arrested on November 23, 1944. Sentenced to death by a military court along with Istvan Patki and Barnabas Pesti, he was executed on December 24, 1944, just short of his 22nd birthday.

In 1974 a commemorative stamp was issued in his honor by the Hungarian Postal Service. In 1977 a public plaque was erected in Orczy Garden, Budapest. After the fall of communism it was taken down and moved to Memento Park, Budapest, opened in 1993 to house monuments associated with Communism or anti-Nazi resistance thus no longer considered acceptable for display in public places. The plaque inscription is a quote from the poem "A Breath of Air" by Attila József which reads: "Come freedom! Bring me order. Show the way, teach me with kind words and leave some time for play to your beautiful, serious son".
