= Postage stamps and postal history of Hungary =

The emblem of the Hungarian Royal Post used between 1867 and 1945

The postal history of Hungary is strongly linked to the history of Hungary. While a messenger system was brought to the Carpathian Basin by Árpád as early as 895, modern mail delivery was first organized by the Habsburgs under the Austrian Empire.

After continued development, the postal systems of Austria and Hungary were formally separated following the Compromise of 1867, with both becoming fully independent after 1908. Both world wars caused heavy damage to the infrastructure. The Hungarian Post was nationalized after 1947. Until 1990, the Post Office controlled not only mail and package delivery, but also the full range of telecommunications, including radio, telephone and television transmissions. When the Post Office was split into separate companies, Magyar Posta JSC was established to handle postal administration.

== The Middle Ages ==
After the colonization of the Carpathian basin in the period up to the late 16th century, the messages of the Hungarian kings were delivered by messengers (pracecones) and couriers (cursores), but counts and lords also maintained separate messenger services. The common people had to ask travelers and merchants to deliver their packets. After the 15th century a service of communal messengers was established to act as an official link between local authorities, assisted by the newly invented carriage.

In 1526, Ferdinand I entrusted the Taxis family with the operation of a permanent postal service between Vienna and Pressburg/Pozsony (modern Bratislava). Leopold I issued a postal patent regulating postal delivery routes, post offices and posthorns. The operation of the postal system was later transferred to the Paar family as a feudal tenure. During Rákóczi's War for Independence a separate postal system was operated in the territories under Rákóczi's rule, operated by János Szepesi, and later by Márton Kossovits.

On 1 July 1722 Charles III nationalized the postal system, and declared the delivery of messages and the establishment of post offices to be a state monopoly. He placed the imperial coat of arms on every postal building, regulated postal tariffs, and developed the existing postal routes, subordinating every post office to the main post office at the imperial court in Vienna. The language of administration was German, and most of the employees were Austrian. In 1784 Maria Theresa's Postal Patent further modernized the system, separating normal and mail-coach delivery. The mail-coach service started one year later throughout the empire, establishing a permanent route between Vienna and Buda in 1752.

== 1800–1867 ==
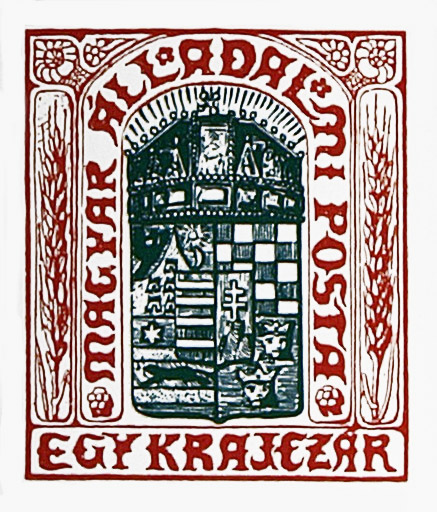
The 1 kr stamp of Mór Than

The first public mailboxes for letters were introduced in 1817. Telegraphy appeared, but was not widely used until its development and standardization of language by Samuel Morse. The first telegraph station on Hungarian territory was opened in December 1847 in Pozsony. During the Hungarian Revolution of 1848 attempts were made to create a separate system under the supervision of the Agricultural, Industrial and Commercial Ministry. One of the first tasks of its minister, Gábor Klauzál, was to legislate for privacy of correspondence, and the use of Hungarian language and symbols in stamps and seals. Mór Than designed what was intended to be the first Hungarian stamp, but due to later military developments it was never printed.

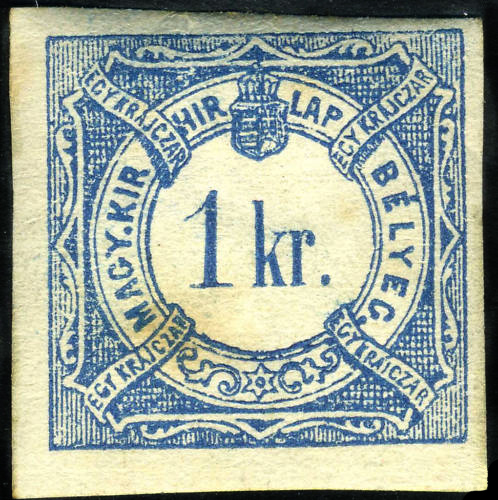
An 1868 newspaper stamp of Hungary

After the failed revolution of 1848, the Hungarian post was reabsorbed into Austrian administration. Franz Joseph I issued a Postal Patent on 26 December 1850, which restored pre-1848 conditions. There were several developments in the next few years, including the unification of normal and mail-coach delivery, and the introduction of stamps and of money orders in 1850. From 1855 letters were delivered to home addresses, trains started to carry letters, and express delivery was introduced in 1859. Postage stamps were issued for the dual monarchy of Austria-Hungary on 1 June 1867 in eight values along with one 1 Kreuzer (krajcár in Hungarian) newspaper stamp. Stamps of Austria were withdrawn from the Kingdom of Hungary on 31 May 1867. The dual monarchy stamps were in use there for just over one year.

== After 1867 ==
As ratified in the Austro-Hungarian Compromise of 1867, the Hungarian post was reassigned to the Agricultural, Industrial and Commercial Ministry of the Kingdom of Hungary. Minister István Gorove had appointed Mihály Gervay as the managing director of Hungarian post. It was decreed by law that the posts of Austria and Hungary were to be treated separately, but under the same principles. The use of the Hungarian language and the national symbols was restored. The emblem of the post was created (a tasseled postal horn, under the Hungarian crown) and was used until the end of World War Two. The current emblem is a simplified version of this design.

The K.u.K. (Imperial and Royal) Empire stamps (2 to 50 kreuzer) remained in use until 31 July 1871.

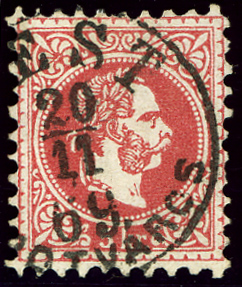
5 kreuzer cancelled at Pest Lipotvaros in 1869

The first specifically Hungarian stamp was released on 1 May 1871. The stamp was produced by the State Press of Buda by lithography, followed by an engraved set and newspaper stamps. There was no indication of language, but the face of Franz Josef appeared above the national emblem, for values 2 to 25 kreuzer. The 25 kreuzer image helps to distinguish the issues.

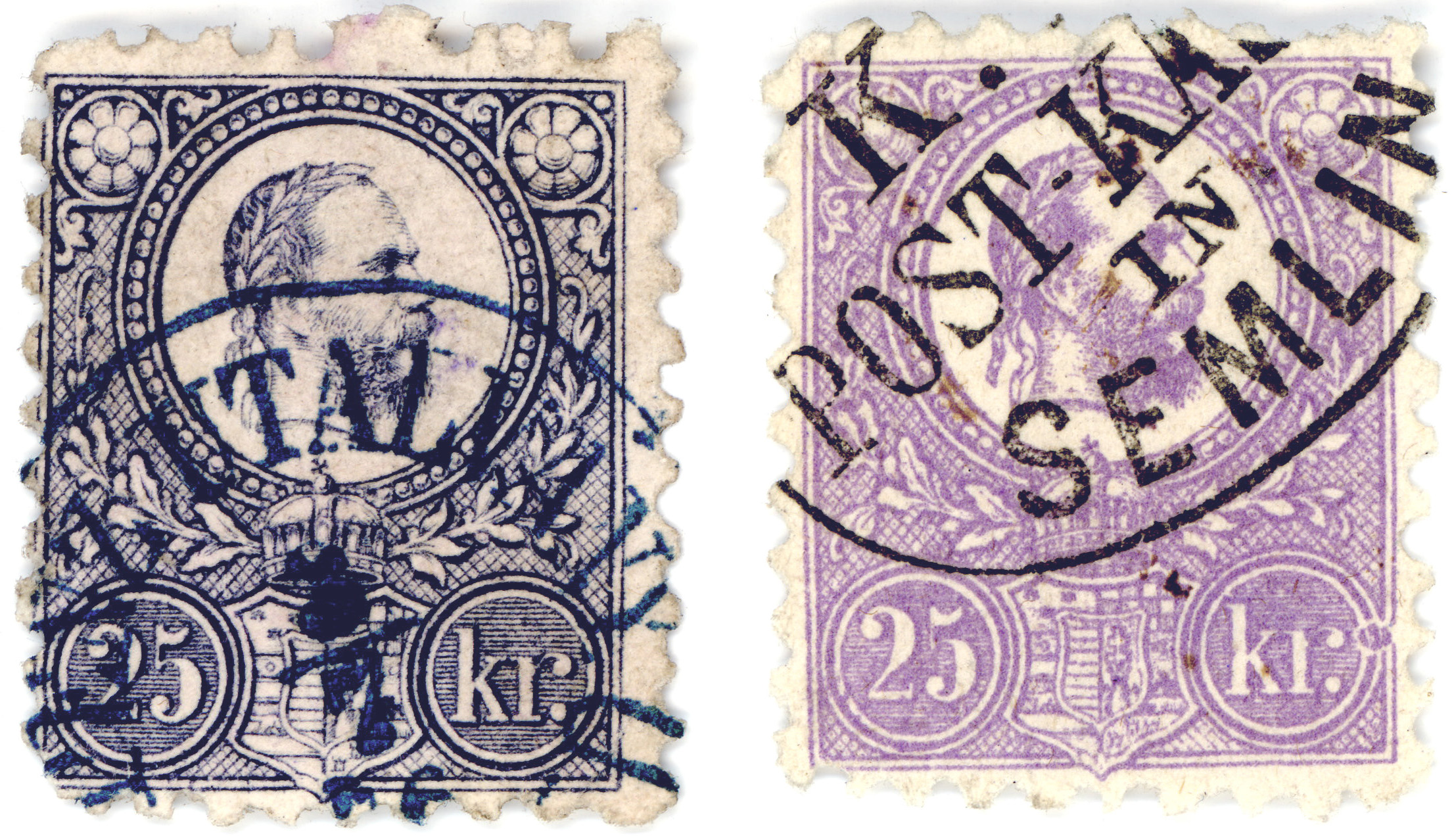
25 kreuzer engraved and lithographed (right stamp)

The very first impression was of poor quality and most of it had to be destroyed. Only a small quantity of this impression was released, in August 1873, and stamps of this impression are rare (2 kreuzer dark yellow).

In 1869, for the first time anywhere in the world, the Austrian and Hungarian post began to process Postal cards (not to be confused with postcards), which do not need a separate stamp (Korrespondenz Karte in German). The popularity of this method of communication is demonstrated by the delivery of over 2.5 million postal cards in 1871. By 1873 the figure reached 6.5 million and in 1900, an estimated 25 million items were delivered.

From 1870 onward, after passing an exam, woman over 18 years were allowed to work in treasury and post offices. The Hungarian Post was one of the founding members of the Universal Postal Union in 1874. From 1885 smaller packages were delivered directly to individual addresses.

In 1887 the Emperor approved the proposal of minister Gábor Baross to unify the post and telegraphy services, and to provide the required experts for the purpose. The Post and Telegraphy College opened in the following year. After 1875 telephone lines began to be built around the empire, later regulated by the 1888 article of telegraphs and electrical signaling apparatus, which also prohibited citizens from setting up or operating public phones. The interurban telephone line between Vienna and Budapest was completed by 1890, with all major cities being connected during the next three years.

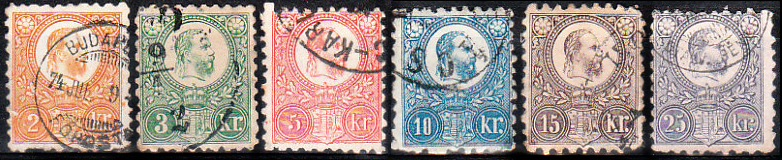
1871 Second issue, engraved stamps of Hungary

The mechanization of the post began before the end of the 19th century. Mechanically-emptied mailboxes started to appear from 1893, and two years later delivery motor tricycles were introduced for permanent use. After 1896, bicycles were introduced to deliver letters and express mail.

The first Hungarian car was designed for the Hungarian Post (in response to a tender in 1903), by mechanical engineer János Csonka. Its 2000 km test drive through the country started on 31 May 1905, and was successfully completed. Hungary was one of the first countries to use cars in mail delivery (from 1909), using Csonka's model for the next two decades. For a number of years the cars also carried passengers.

== 20th century ==
The full independence of the Hungarian Post was declared in article XII of 1908. World War I, and the subsequent military occupations and revolutions, caused severe damage to the postal system, requiring a near complete rebuild. The first notable development was the opening of a 250 watt radio phone station in Csepel in 1923. The station's original task was to transmit news to the regional offices of the Hungarian news wire agency, but in empty air times music and songs were transmitted on an experimental basis, starting on 15 March 1924. From 1933 onwards, regional transmitter stations were opened, also upgrading the Csepel station to 120 kW (with a height of 314m).

In the early part of the 20th century the stamps mainly depicted the mythical "Turul" or Hungary's first king, St. Stephen.

Following the change of currency in 1892, the 20th century saw many further changes of currency including the Korona (until 1927), the Pengő (until 1946) and from 1946 onwards, the Forint (with the subdivision Fillér until 1999).

The growing workforce required social investments. During the Horthy era, from 1920 onward, the post office opened holiday resorts, medical facilities, sanatoriums, canteens and a retirement home for their staff. In 1927 the first internal regulation for dealing with mail was published and Article 35 of the 1936 parliamentary regulations consolidated all previous postal regulations into a single Article. World War II placed many new demands on the postal services, including the operation of the military post, the postal development and administration of the territories removed from Hungary by the Trianon Treaty after World War I and restored to Hungary by the Third Reich (the First and Second Vienna Awards). The ravages of World War II destroyed most of the previous decades' achievements and most of the system had to be rebuilt from scratch.

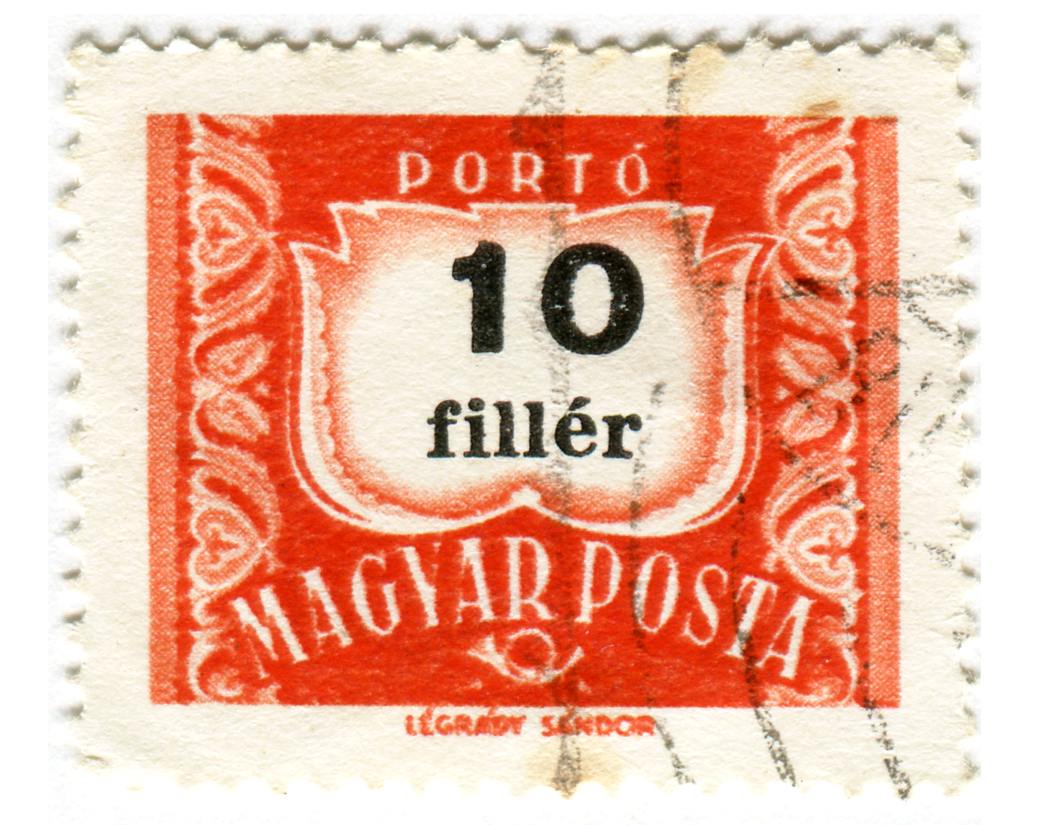
A widely used 10 fillér porto (postage due) stamp from the second half of the 20th century

However rebuilding was rapid. Mail delivery was operating again from March 1945 in Budapest and from May in the whole country, with money orders starting in June and package delivery, telephone and telegraph in July. From 1 May 1945 the Hungarian Radio Corporation broadcast again. Recovery, including buildings and personnel, was not complete until 1952. Consistent with the political climate, the Hungarian Post was gradually nationalized after 1947, with several postal companies and institutions either ceasing to exist or becoming part of the national organisation.

Consistent with the era's technical developments, the transmitting service was rapidly upgraded in the following decades. Experiments with television broadcasting started in 1950, with official (but still experimental) broadcasts starting in 1953. In 1958 a television broadcast tower was put in operation on the summit of the Széchenyi mountain. 1967 saw the introduction of the crossbar technology and in 1970 the time-sharing multiplex system, opening the first container telephone station.

== Recent years ==
Starting in 1980 significant changes began in the structure of the Hungarian Post. It became a prime authority in 1983 (named the Centre of Hungarian Post).

Hungary is famous for its use of goldleaf in its stamps and is sometimes categorised with the Czech Republic, Serbia and Austria.

After the change of regime in 1989 the institution dissolved into three separate entities, namely the Magyar Telekom, the Hungarian Broadcasting Company, and the Hungarian Post Company, each continuing a task of the formerly unified firm in the form of independent, self-supporting companies. In his article LIII. of 1992 the minister of traffic, telecommunications and water conservancy declared the Post company to be a state owned joint stock company. The new Post, natively named the Magyar Posta Részvénytársaság, started on 1 January 1994, and is the legal successor of the former Hungarian Post (Magyar Posta Vállalat).

For legal reasons, the proper native name changed to Magyar Posta Zrt. (shortened) on 2 January 2006.

== Postal stationery ==
The first items of postal stationery to be issued by Hungary were postcards in 1869 followed by envelopes in 1871 and newspaper wrappers in 1872. Lettercards were issued in 1886 and aerogrammes were first issued in 1969.

== See also ==
- List of people on stamps of Hungary
- Magyar Posta
- Postage stamps and postal history of Austria

== References and sources ==
Sources

- Vilmos, Hennyey. A Magyar posta története. Budapest: Wodianer, 1926. OCLC: 250169627
- Lajos, Pap. A Magyar posta monográfiája. Budapest: Fráter és Társa, 1939. OCLC: 43269413
- Lajos, Hencz. A Magyar posta története és érdemes munkásai. Budapest : Merkantil-Nyomda, 1937. OCLC: 32848664
