= List of Hungarian architects =

This is a list of Hungarian architects.

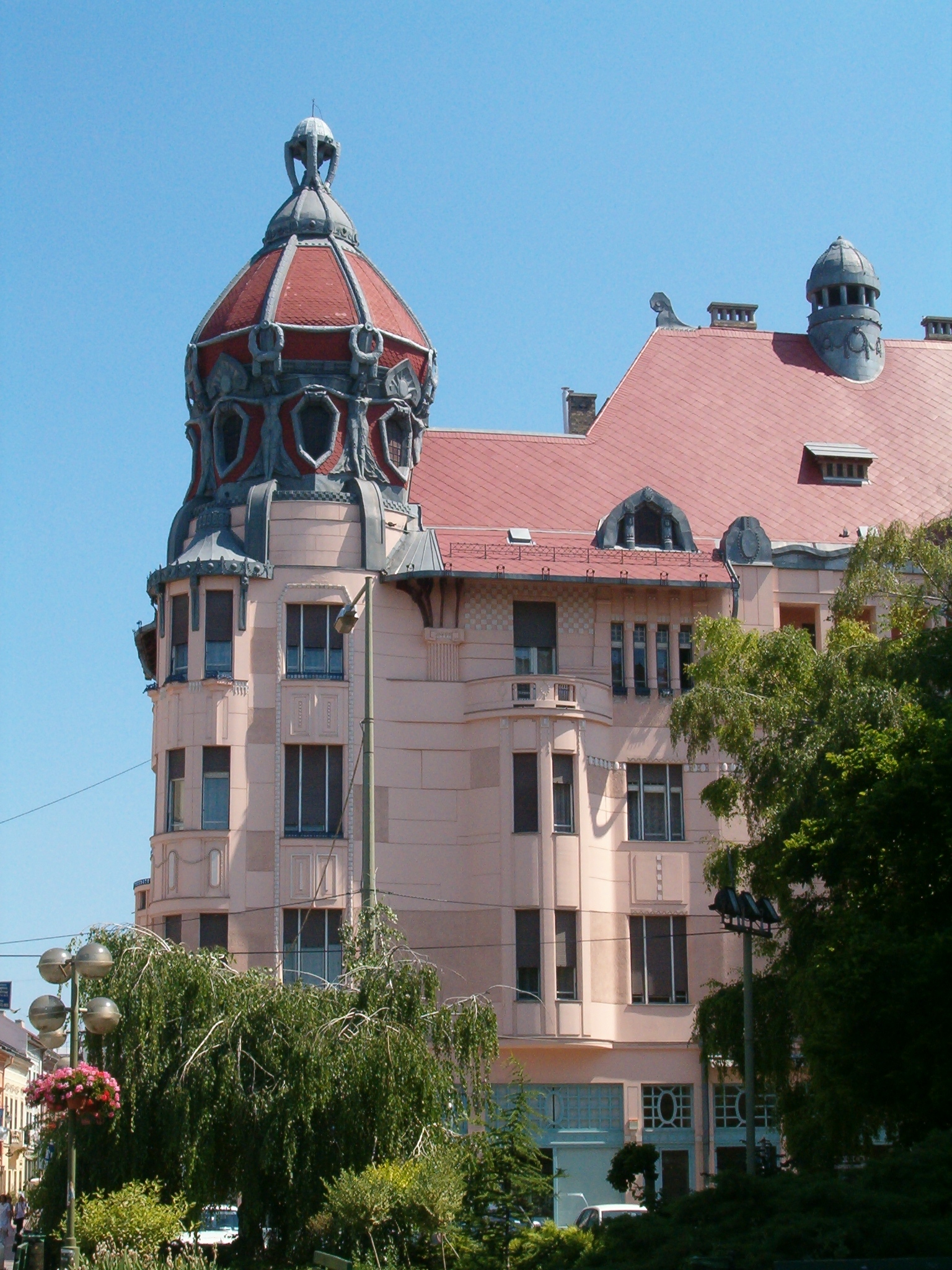
The Unger-Mayer House in Szeged designed by Ede Magyar, built between 1910 and 1911

== 18th century ==
- József Jung (1734–1808)

== 19th century ==
- Emil Ágoston (1876–1921)
- Ignác Alpár (1855–1928)
- Aladár Árkay (1868–1932)
- Lipót Baumhorn (1860–1932)
- Győző Czigler (1850–1905)
- Frigyes Feszl (1821–1884)
- Alajos Hauszmann (1847–1926)
- József Hild (1789–1867)
- István Kiss (1857–1902)
- Flóris Korb (1860–1930)
- Béla Lajta (1873–1920)
- Adolf Lang (1848–1913)
- Géza Maróti (1875–1941)
- Gyula Pártos (1845–1916)
- Samu Pecz (1854–1922)
- Ferenc Pfaff (1851–1913)
- Mihály Pollack (1773–1855)
- Zsigmond Quittner (1859–1918)
- Ferenc Reitter (1813–1874)
- Gyula Rochlitz (1825–1886)
- Albert Schickedanz (1846–1915)
- Frigyes Schulek (1841–1919)
- Imre Steindl (1839–1902)
- Miklós Ybl (1814–1891)

== Secession (early 20th century) ==
- Károly Kós (1883–1977)
- Béla Lajta (1873–1920)
- Ödön Lechner (1845–1914)
- Ede Magyar (1877–1912)
- István Medgyaszay (1877–1959)

== 20th century ==
- Ferenc Bán (born 1940)
- István Beöthy (1897–1961)
- Marcel Breuer (1902–1981)
- László Csaba (1924–1995)
- Ákos Eleőd (born 1961)
- László Földes (born 1959)
- Ernő Goldfinger (1902–1987)
- Dénes Györgyi (1886–1961)
- Alfréd Hajós (1878–1955)
- László Hudec (1893–1958)
- Oskar Kaufmann (1873–1956)
- Paul László (1900–1993)
- Dezső Lauber (1879–1966)
- Imre Makovecz (1935–2011)
- Gábor Preisich (1909–1998)
- László Rajk Jr. (1949–2019)
- Gyula Rimanóczy (1903–1958)
- Ernő Rubik (born 1944)
- Eva Vecsei (born 1930)
- Roland Wank (1898–1970)

== See also ==
- List of architects
- List of Hungarians
