= István Kiss (sculptor) =

Hungarian sculptor

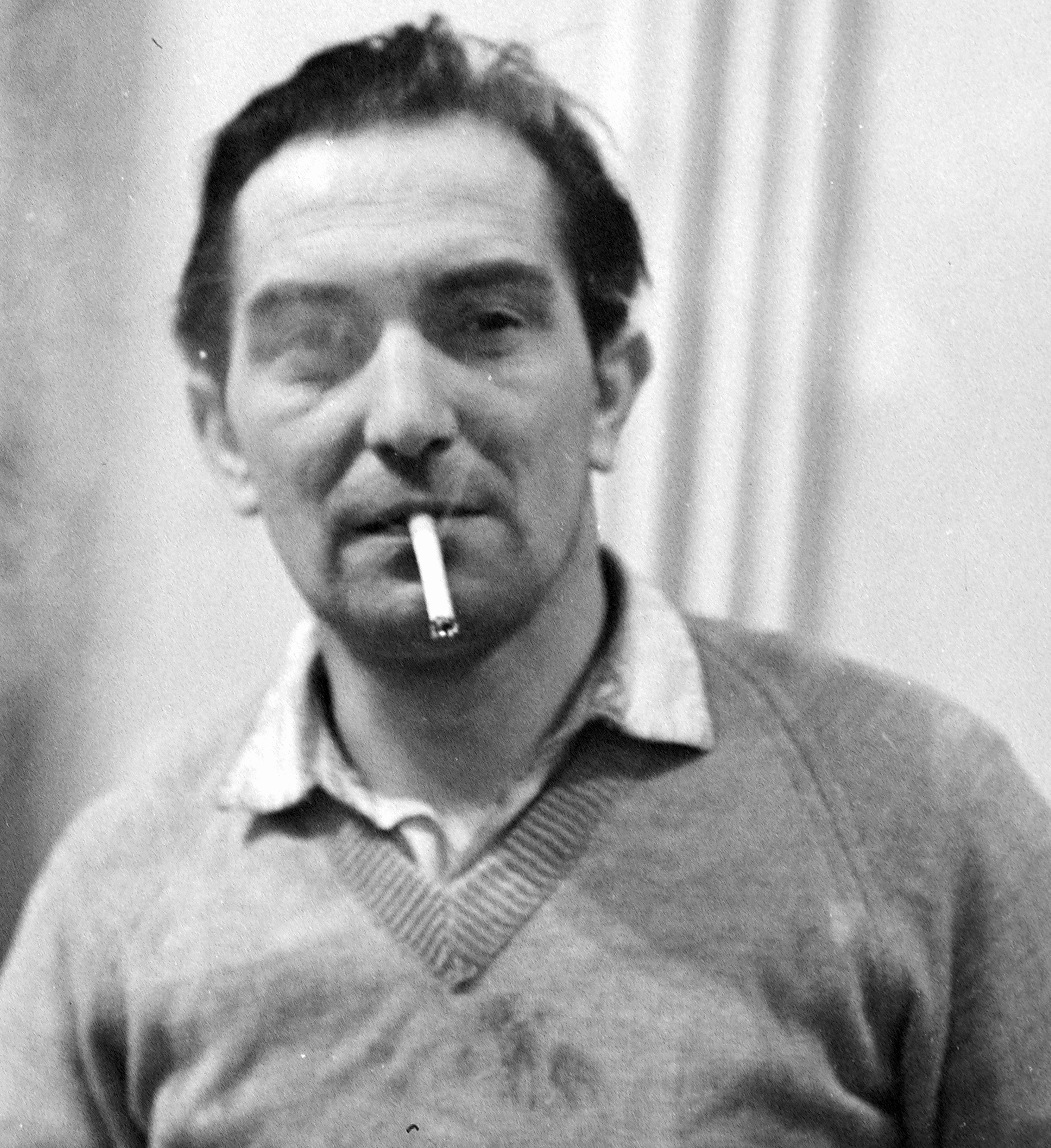
- István Kiss, 1961
- Born: 8 June 1927; Biharillye, Hungary
- Died: 29 December 1997 (aged 70); Szekszárd, Hungary
- Notable work: Republic of Councils Monument

István Kiss (Biharillye, 8 June 1927 – Szekszárd, 29 December 1997) was a Hungarian sculptor and a member of the Hungarian Socialist Workers' Party Central Committee between 1975 and 1989.

== Education ==
Kiss attended secondary school at Nagyszalonta and Újpest. He graduated from the Könyves Kálmán Gimnázium. In 1946 he was student of András Kocsis and Imre Kovács Turáni. From 1948 to 1953 he was student of Zsigmond Kisfaludi Strobl and Sándor Mikus and Pál Pátzay at the Hungarian University of Fine Arts.

== Offices ==
Kiss was a member of the Hungarian Socialist Workers' Party Central Committee between 22 March 1975 and 7 October 1989.

== Works ==
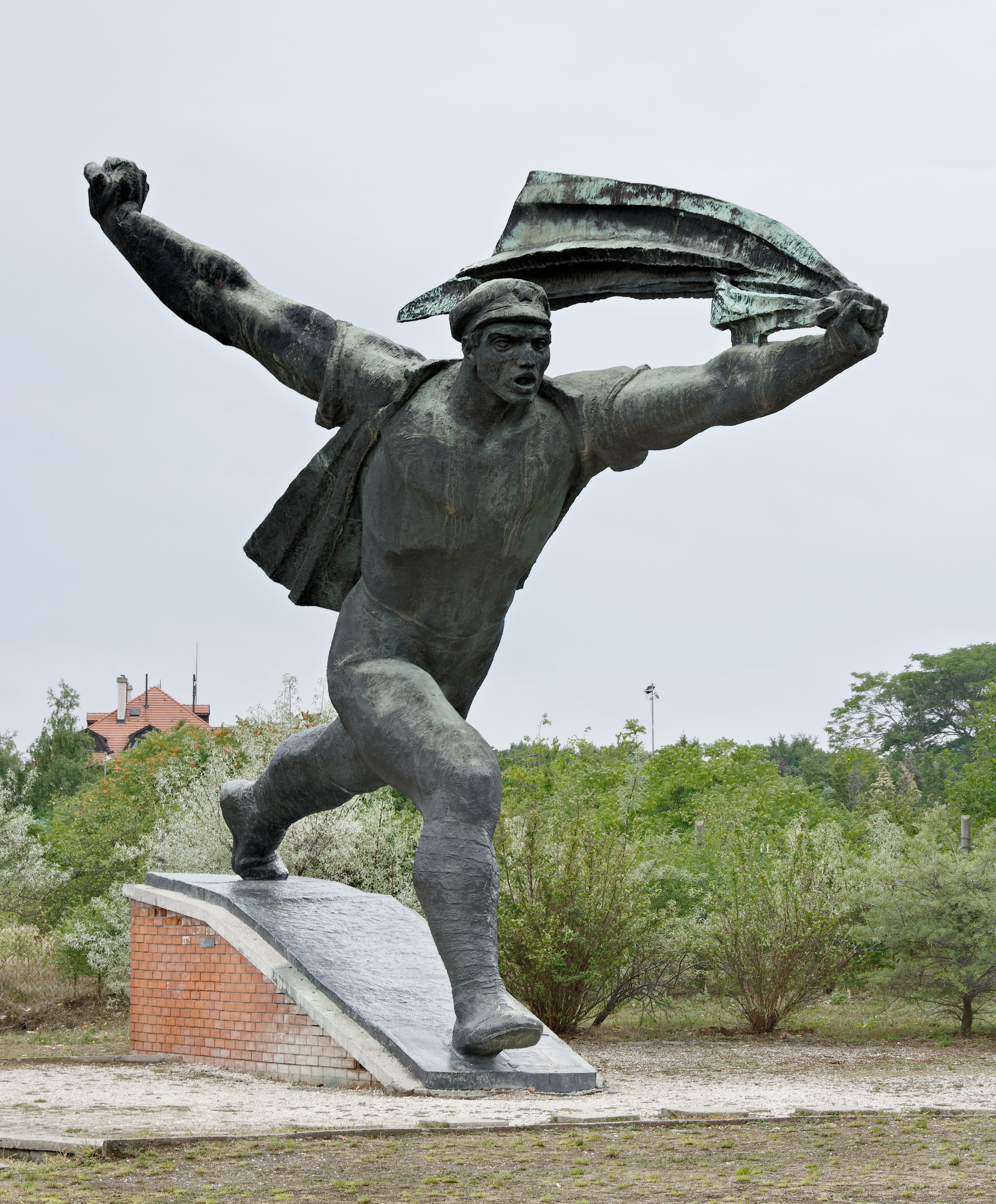
The Republic of Councils Monument at Memento Park. A memorial for the Hungarian Soviet Republic.

One of his most notable sculptures is the Republic of Councils Monument (Hungarian: Tanácsköztársasági emlékmű), currently sitting at the Memento Park.
