= Socialist Workers Party of Hungary =

The Socialist Workers Party of Hungary (Hungarian: Magyarországi Szocialista Munkáspárt, MSZMP) was a political party in Hungary. The party was founded by social democrats and communists in 1925, and led by István Vági. Unlike the established Hungarian Social Democratic Party, the Socialist Workers Party sought to mobilize mass movements and agrarian struggles.

Imre Nagy, the future prime minister and leader of the 1956 Revolution, was involved in organizing the underground MSZMP chapter in his home town of Kaposvár. The Hungarian Socialist Workers' Party he helped establish during the Revolution was similarly named.

The regime of Miklós Horthy cracked down on the party in 1928. Its leaders, such as Vági and Mátyás Rákosi were arrested and sentenced to one year in prison. The prominent leaders of the party Sándor Fürst and Imré Sallai were executed in 1932 on false charges.

== Bibliography ==
- Rainer, János M. (2009) [2002]. Imre Nagy: A Biography. Translated by Legters, Lyman H. London: I.B. Tauris. ISBN 978-1-84511-959-1.
