= Ákos Eleőd =

Hungarian architect

Ákos Eleőd (born 28 October 1961, in Budapest) is a Hungarian architect responsible for designing Statue Park.

== Additional Sources ==
- Ki kicsoda, 2006. MTI, Budapest, 2005.

== See also ==
- List of Hungarian architects
