= Kató Hámán =

Hungarian Esperantist and communist (1884–1936)

Kato Haman
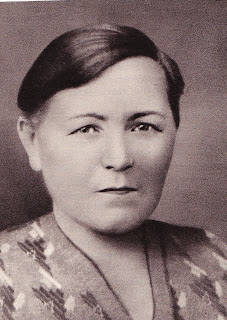
- a stamp in her honour
- Born: 2 December 1884; Kompolt, Hungary
- Died: 31 August 1936 (aged 51); Budapest, Hungary
- Known for: communist heroine

Kató Hámán (2 December 1884 – 31 August 1936) was a Hungarian Esperantist and communist activist. She was a political prisoner under the regime of Miklós Horthy. During the 1950s she was a workers heroine in Hungary. A stamp was issued in International Women's Day in Hungary in 1960 in her honour. Another stamp was issued by Hungary in 1984 on the anniversary of her 100th birthday.

== Life ==
Hámán was born in Kompolt, Hungary in 1884. She worked as a cashier for a railway company before becoming a union representative. She studied Esperanto in 1919 and her enthusiasm for the language led to her serving on committees. She was also active in the Hungarian Communist Party serving on a leading committee in 1922 with Károly Őry and Ignác Gőgös. These three were described as "a troika", with Hámán as the veteran, who continued to operate even after the central committee was disbanded in 1922.

Hámán was placed on trial in 1925 and imprisoned. She escaped and fled to Vienna, but was re-arrested in 1934. Hámán died in Budapest after being released from prison in 1936. Some say that she died of a disease caught in prison and others said that she was murdered in prison.

== Legacy ==
After her death Kató Hámán was a heroine of the state during its communist period and two stamps were issued with her portrait on them and a plaque was placed on her house. The plaque read "Kató Hámán, an eminent figure in the worker's movement who was murdered in a fascist Horthy prison lived in this house from 1919 to 1931". After the fall of the Soviet Union it was taken down and moved to Memento Park, Budapest, opened in 1993, which houses monuments associated with Communism or opposition to Fascism therefore not considered acceptable for display in public places. The guide book to this park supplies a biography which records that she died from disease she contracted in prison.

Schools and streets were named in her honour but these have mostly been renamed. In 1956 there was a statue of her at the entrance to the Western Railway Station in Budapest.
