= Magyar Posta =

Hungarian postal company

Magyar Posta Zrt.
- Company type: formerly state-owned, Limited company
- Industry: Postal Service
- Founded: 1867
- Headquarters: Budapest, Hungary
- Key people: György Schamschula, CEO
- Revenue: 675,000,000 euro (2018)
- Net income: −7,600,000 euro (2018)
- Owner: State of Hungary
- Number of employees: 31,843 (2018)
- Divisions: MPL (Magyar Posta Logistics)
- Subsidiaries: Posta Kézbesítő LLC; Postaautó Duna Zrt. Posta Pénzszolgáltató JSC; JNT Security Logisztikai és Biztonsági LLC
- Website: www.posta.hu

Magyar Posta Zrt. (Hungarian pronunciation: [ˈmɒɟɒr ˈpoʃtɒ ˈzeːjɛrteː], lit. 'Hungarian Post JSC') or Hungarian Post is the postal administration of Hungary. Besides normal mail delivery, Magyar Posta also offers logistics, banking, and marketing services.

== History ==
The origin of the Magyar Posta was the independent national public institution called Magyar Királyi Posta established in 1867, as part of the Austro-Hungarian Compromise of 1867. While at first it used the stamps of the Austrian Empire, in 1871 it issued its own stamps. The Magyar Királyi Posta was the first to experiment with the motorization of the postal conveyances, beginning in 1897. In 1900, they adopted János Csonka's motorized tricycle, which continued in use by the postal service until the 1920s.

In 1918, they briefly dropped the Királyi from their name during the First Hungarian Republic (1918-1920), and restored it under the regency beginning in 1920. In 1945, under the provisional government it again became just Magyar Posta.

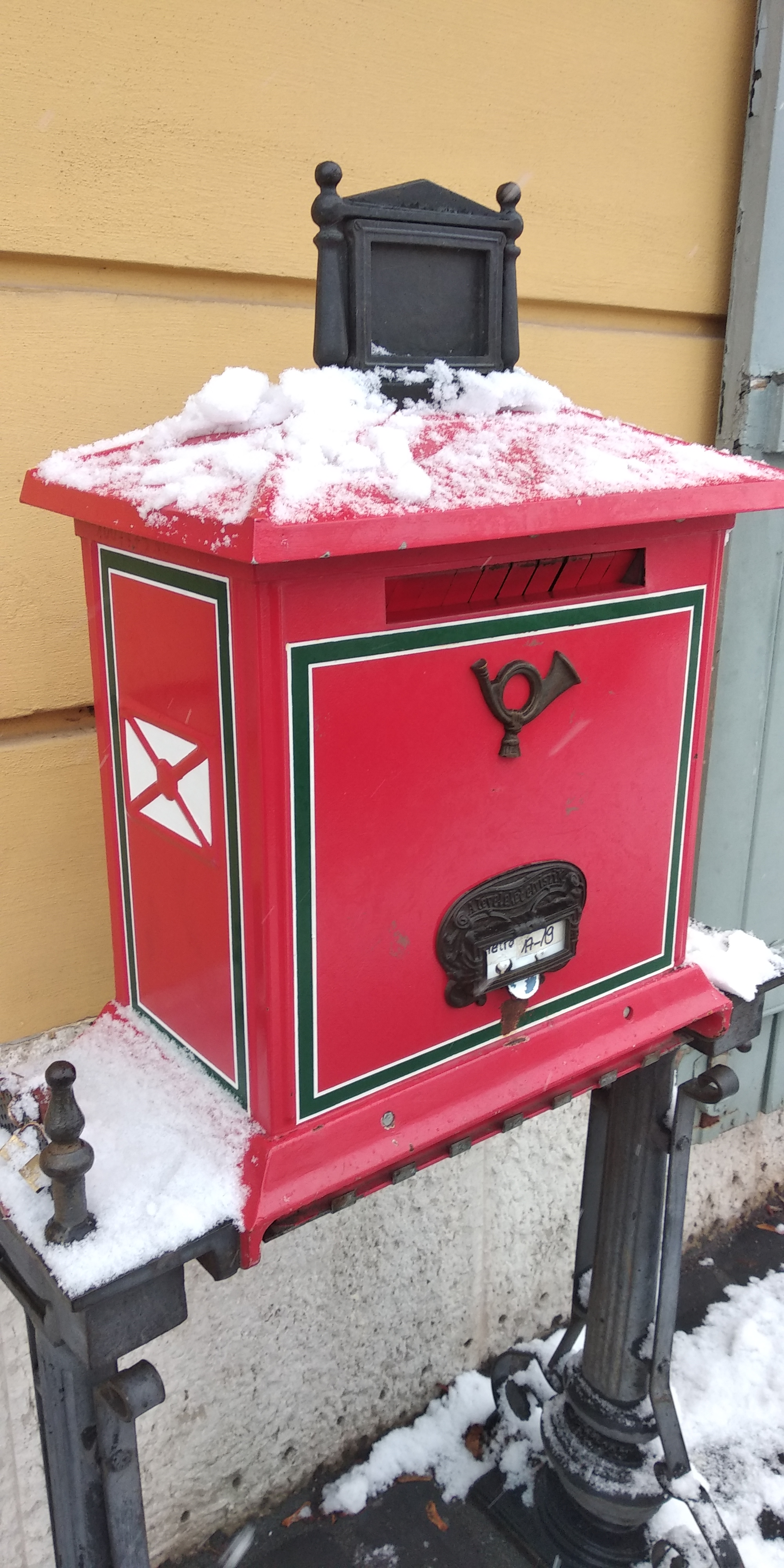
A mailbox in Budapest.

The Magyar Posta became an independent agency in 1983. On January 1, 1990, during the change of regime, the unified Magyar Posta was divided into three organizations. The telephone service was spun off into the Hungarian Telecommunications Company, and broadcasting became the Hungarian Broadcasting Company. Magyar Posta became a separate and independent corporation under the Minister of Transport. In 1994, it was privatized into a joint-stock corporation with some government ownership. In 2006, it became a private limited liability company.

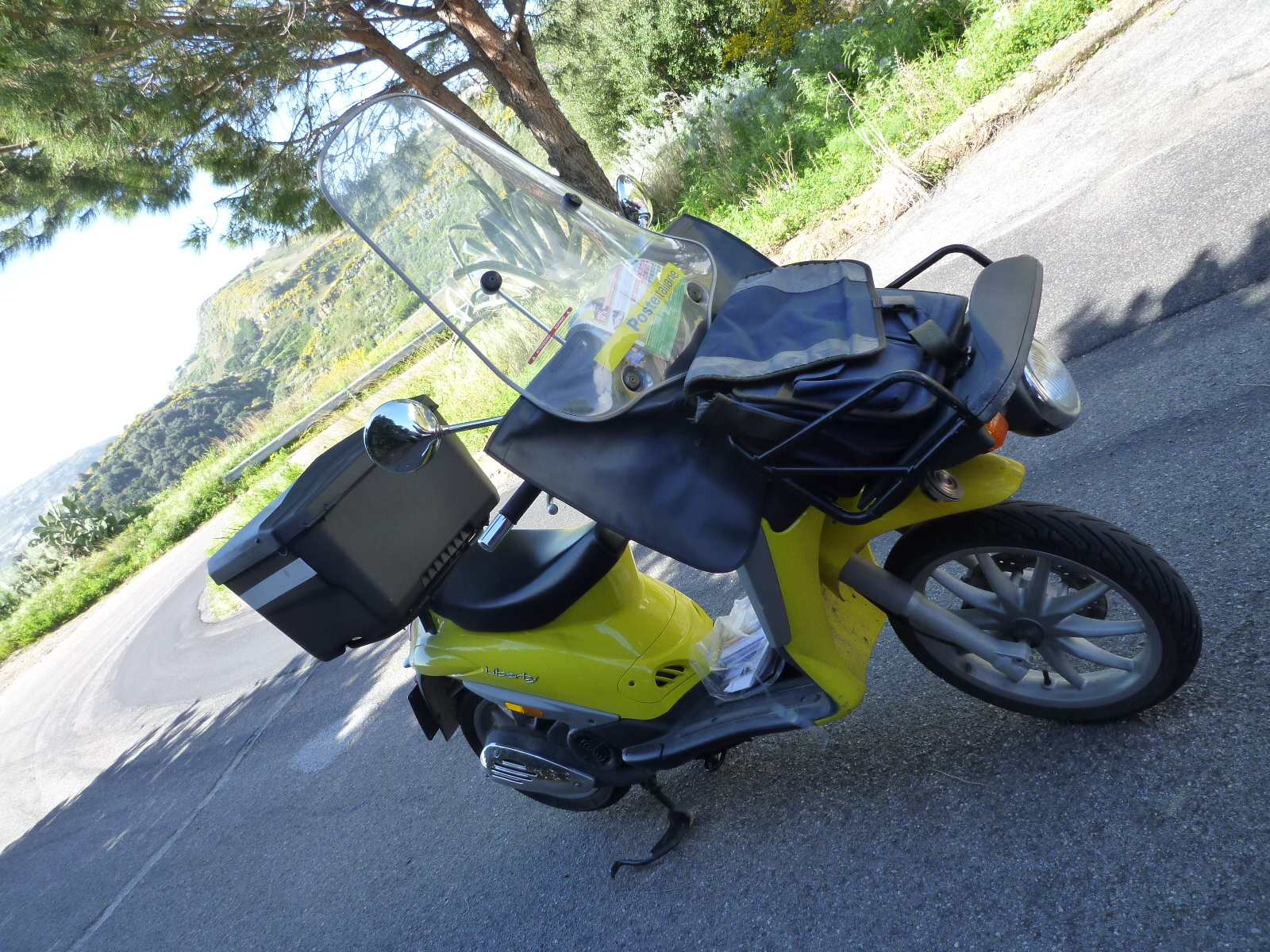
Magyar Posta have almost 700 motorcycles and mopeds designed for parcel delivery tasks.The 4-liter box of the 50-cubic-centimeter vehicle can safely transport larger consignments due to its size and design. At the front, there is a frame on which you can even fit the delivery bag or a larger package.

== See also ==
- Postage stamps and postal history of Hungary
- Postal codes in Hungary
