= Dorottya Kanizsai =

Hungarian noblewoman

Dorottya Kanizsai (d. after 1532) was a Hungarian noblewoman known for her role in burying the dead at the Battle of Mohács.

Born into an aristocratic family, she married first Péter Geréb and then Imre Perényi, who both held the office of palatine.

According to the seventeenth-century historian Miklós Istvánffy, Dorottya hired four hundred workers to bury the soldiers killed at the battle of Mohács. The story was commemorated with a painting by Sóma Orlai Petrics (1860), a postage stamp, and a statue at the Mohács National Memorial.

In her second widowhood, she held court at the castle of Siklós, where she was known for her humanitarian work.

She is the namesake of several buildings, including the Kaniszai Dorottya Múzeum.

== Gallery ==
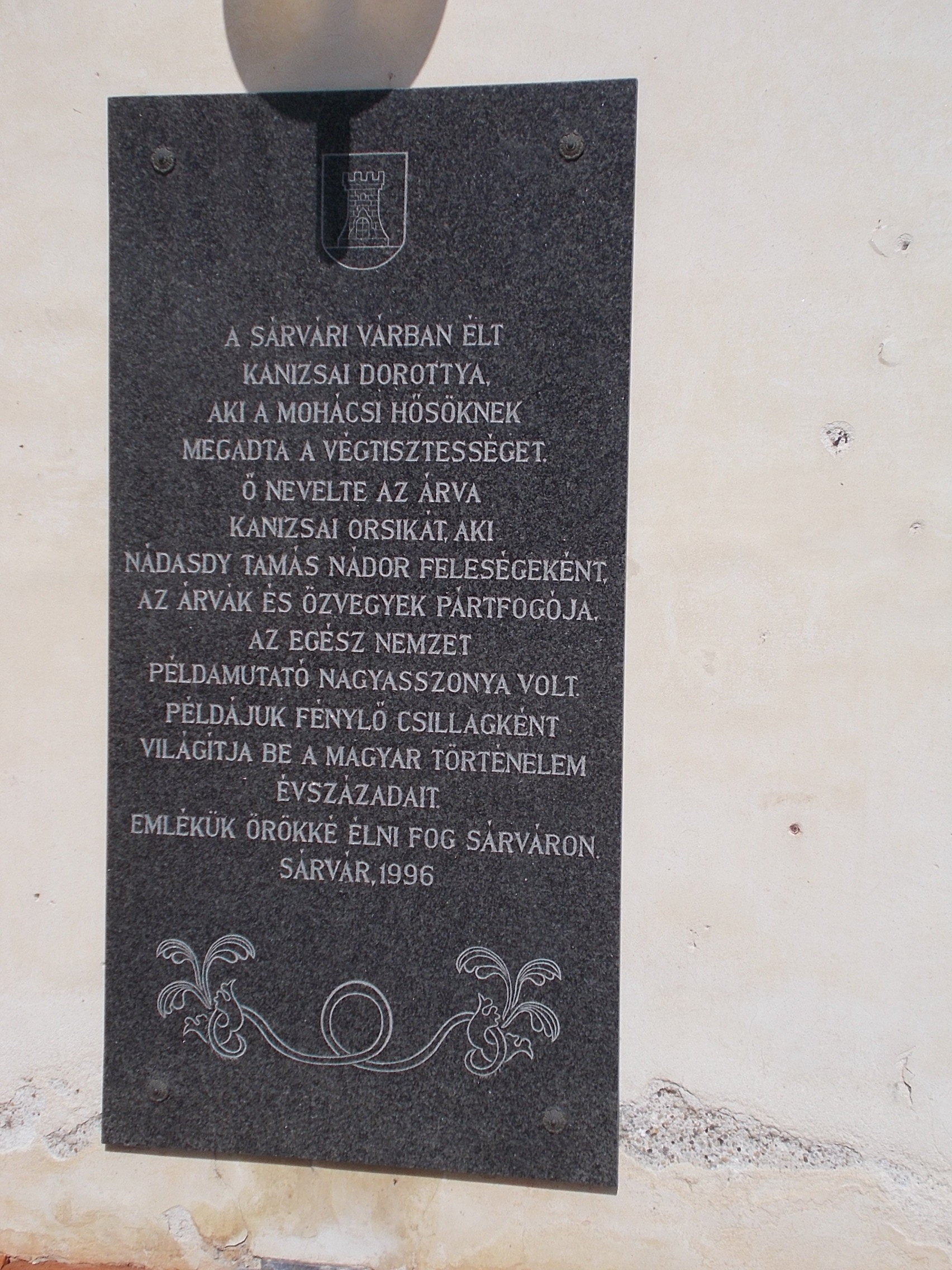
Plaque to Dorottya Kanizsai at Nádasdy Castle

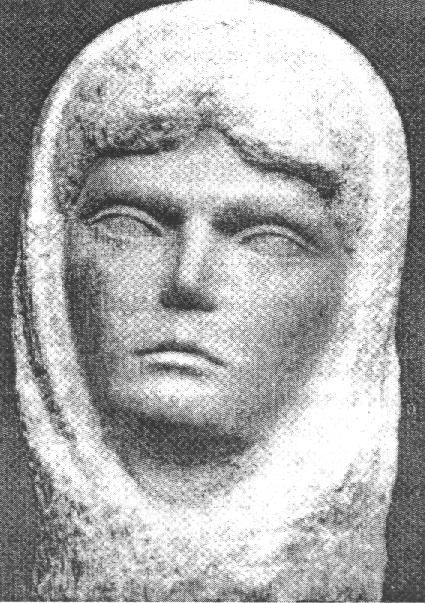
Sculpture of Dorottya Kanizsai by Iván Sándor, circa 1933

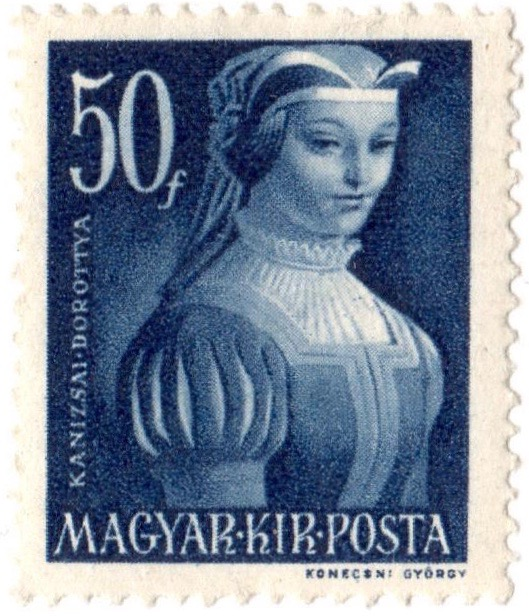
1944 postage stamp depicting Dorottya Kanizsai

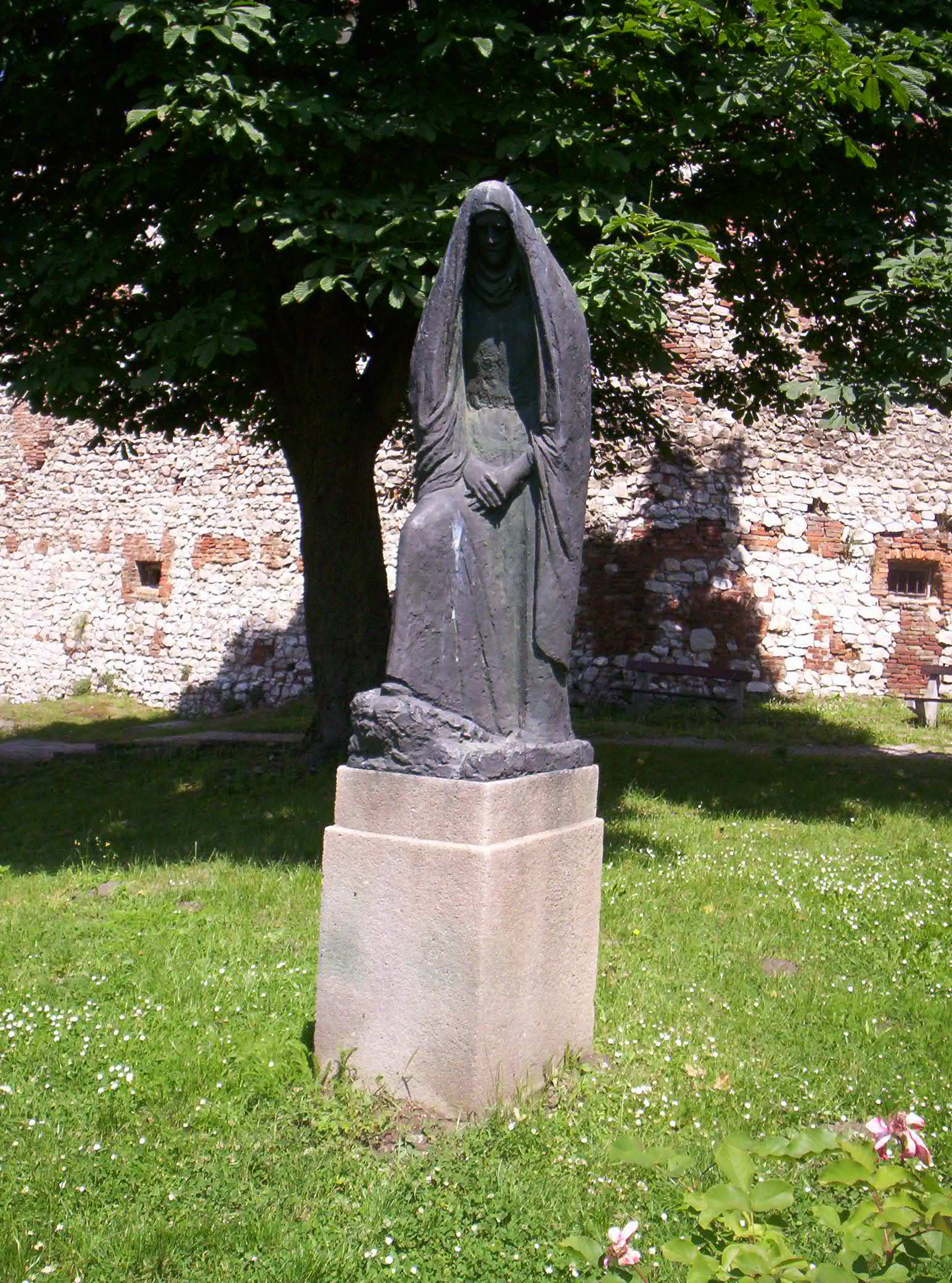
Sculpture of Dorottya Kanizsai in Siklós, by Miklós Borsos
