= István Vági =

Hungarian politician (1883–1938)

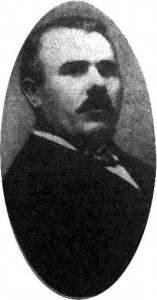
István Vági in 1925

István Vági (24 June 1883 – 13 August 1938) was a Hungarian socialist politician.

== Biography ==
Vági was born in to a Reformed family and was trained carpenter. He had been a union member since 1902. During the Hungarian Soviet Republic, he served as political commissar of the construction workers' battalion in the Red Army.

After the fall of the Soviet Republic, he was secretary of the Social Democratic Party organization, first in Győr, then in Pécs. Vági was one of the leaders of the left opposition within the Hungarian Social Democratic Party and maintained contacts with the banned Hungarian Communist Party (KMP). In January 1925 he was expelled from the Social Democratic Party. Vági was one of the co-founders of the Socialist Workers' Party of Hungary (MSZMP), a new, legal workers' party founded by left-wing social democrats and communists. At the founding party congress on April 14, 1925, Vági was elected chairman of the MSZMP. At the first KMP party congress in Vienna in August 1925, Vági was also elected to the Central Committee of the KMP, which was still illegal in Hungary. At the end of 1925, he and other officials were arrested and brought to trial. However, Vági was acquitted on August 4, 1926, due to a lack of evidence, as the police could not prove the close connection between the legal MSzMP and the illegal KMP. Before the 1926 parliamentary elections, Vági led the MSZMP's election campaign.

In February 1927, Vági was arrested again, this time sentenced to four and a half years in prison. After his release in 1932, he emigrated to the Soviet Union. He then worked in the Central European department of the Red International of Trade Unions. In 1935, he was elected to the Moscow Soviet. On March 23, 1938, Vági was arrested on trumped-up charges of espionage during the Great Purge and sentenced to death by firing squad on July 29, 1938. The sentence was carried out on August 13, 1938.

István Vági was posthumously rehabilitated on November 26, 1955.

In 1983, the Hungarian Post issued a special stamp to mark Vági's 100th birthday.
