= Soviet involvement in regime change =

Map of locations affected by Soviet involvement in regime change. (Note: If more than one category applies, only the most direct action is labeled, in the order of preference listed below (from most indirect to most direct). If the action affected (one of) a current country's immediate legal predecessor(s), the modern country is labeled to reflect it.) Soviet Union Interfered in elections on behalf of preferred candidate(s) or against non-preferred candidate(s) Organized or gave material/financial support to coup plotters/armed groups which failed to overthrow incumbent government Organized or gave material/financial support to coup plotters/armed groups which overthrew incumbent government or established one after armed conflict. Invaded country to enforce Soviet interests outside declaration of war.

Soviet involvement in regime change entailed both overt and covert actions aimed at altering, replacing, or preserving foreign governments. In the 1920s, the nascent Soviet Union intervened in multiple governments primarily in Asia, acquiring the territory of Tuva and making Mongolia into a satellite state. During World War II, the Soviet Union helped overthrow many puppet regimes of Nazi Germany and the Empire of Japan, including in East Asia and much of Europe. Soviet forces were also instrumental in ending the rule of Adolf Hitler over Germany.

In the aftermath of World War II, the Soviet government struggled with the United States for global leadership and influence within the context of the Cold War. It expanded the geographic scope of its actions beyond its traditional area of operations. In addition, the Soviet Union and Russia engaged in foreign electoral intervention in the national elections of many countries. One study indicated that the Soviet Union and Russia engaged in 36 interventions in foreign elections from 1946 to 2000.

The Soviet Union ratified the UN Charter in 1945, the preeminent international law document, which legally bound the Soviet government to the Charter's provisions, including Article 2(4), which prohibits the threat or use of force in international relations, except in very limited circumstances. Therefore, any legal claim advanced to justify regime change by a foreign power carries a particularly heavy burden.

The U.S. government examined cases of Soviet interventions within the context of international law, specifically the interpretation of the UN Charter in view of sovereignty and the use of force. Some cases have been discussed in official U.S. documentation.

== 1921–1940: Interwar period ==
=== 1920s ===
==== 1921–1924: Mongolia ====
The location of Mongolia

The Mongolian Revolution of 1911 saw Mongolia declare independence from the Qing dynasty in China, ruled by Bogd Khan. In 1912, the Qing dynasty collapsed into the Republic of China. In 1915, Russia and China signed the Kyatha agreement, making it autonomous. However, when the Russian Civil War broke out, China, working with Mongolian aristocrats, retook Mongolia in 1919. At the same time the Russian Civil War raged on and the White Army were, by 1921, beginning to lose to the Red Army. One of the commanders, Roman Ungern Von Sternberg, saw this and decided to abandon the White Army with his forces. He led his army into Mongolia in 1920, and conquered it completely by February 1921, putting Bogd Khan back into power.

The Bolsheviks had been worried about Sternberg and, at the request of the Mongolian People's Party, invaded Mongolia in August 1921 helping with the Mongolian Revolution of 1921. The Soviets moved from many directions and captured many locations in the country. Sternberg fought back and marched into the USSR but he was captured and killed by the Soviets on 15 September 1921. The Soviets kept Bogd Khan in power, as a constitutional monarch, hoping to keep good relations with China, while continuing to occupy the country. However, when Bogd Khan died in 1924, the Mongolian Revolutionary government declared that no reincarnations shall be accepted and set up the People's Republic of Mongolia which would exist in power until 1992.

==== 1929: Tannu Tuva ====
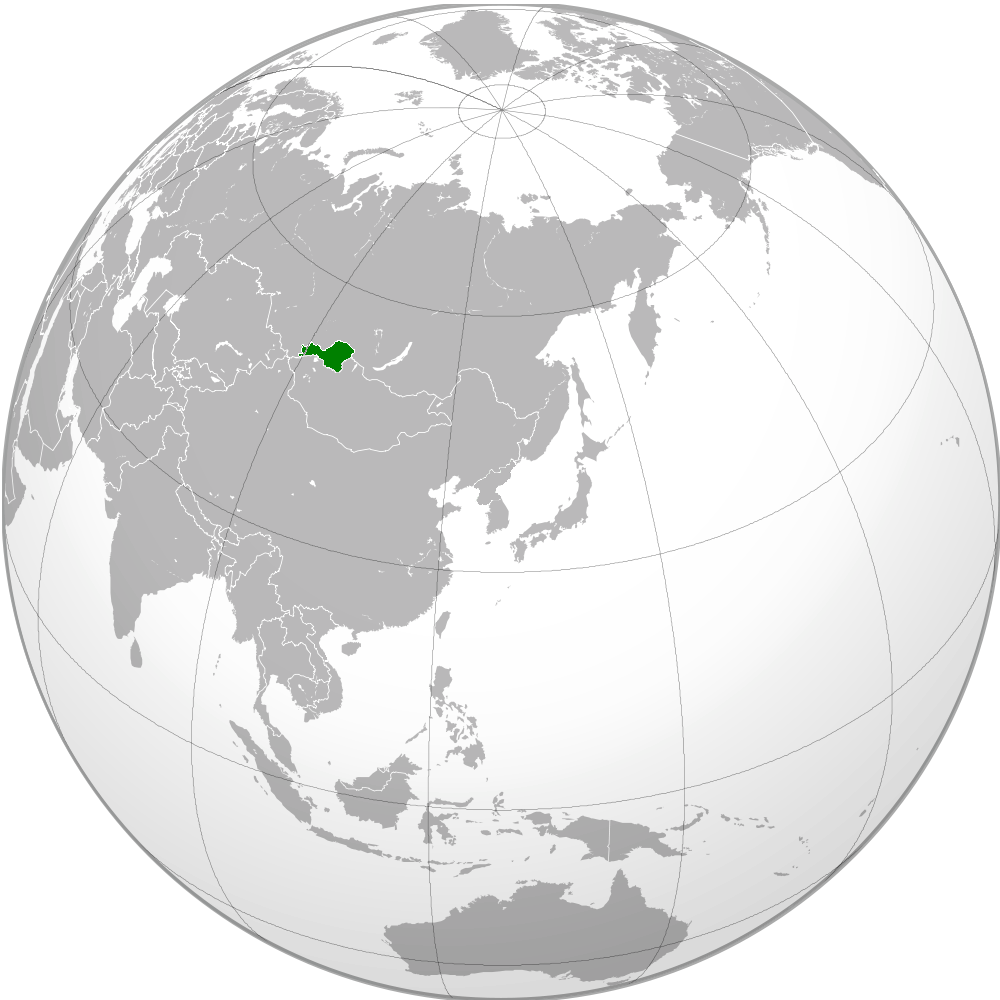
Location of the Tuvan People's Republic (modern boundaries)

After the fall of the Qing Dynasty in the 1911 Revolution, the province of Tannu Uriankhai became independent, and was then made a protectorate of the Russian empire. During the Russian Civil War, the Red Army created the Tuvan People's Republic. It was located in between Mongolia and the USSR and was only recognized by the two countries. Their Prime Minister was Donduk Kuular, a former Lama with many ties to the Lamas present in the country. He tried to put his country on a Theocratic and Nationalistic path, tried to sow closer ties with Mongolia, and made Buddhism the state religion. He was also resistant to the collectivization policies of the Soviet Union. This was alarming and irritating to Joseph Stalin, the Soviet Union's leader.

The Soviet Union would set the ground for a coup. They encouraged the "Revolutionary Union of Youth" movement, and educated many of them at Communist University of the Toilers of the East. In January 1929, five youths educated at the school would launch a coup with Soviet support and depose Kuular, imprisoning and later executing him. Salchak Toka would become the new head of the country. Under the new government, collectivization policies were implemented. A purge was launched in the country against aristocrats, Buddhists, intellectuals, and other political dissidents, which would also see the destruction of many monasteries.

==== 1929: Afghanistan ====
After the Third Anglo-Afghan War, the Kingdom of Afghanistan had full independence from the British Empire, and could make their own foreign relations. Amanullah Khan, the king of Afghanistan, made relations with the USSR, among many other countries, such as signing an agreement of neutrality. There had also been another treaty signed that gave territory to Afghanistan on the condition that they stop Basmachi raids into the USSR. As his reign continued, Amanullah Khan became less popular, and in November 1928 rebels rose up in the east of the country. The Saqqawists allowed Basmachi rebels from the Soviet Union to operate inside the country after coming to power. The Soviet Union sent 1,000 troops into Afghanistan to support Amanullah Khan. When Amanullah fled the country, the Red Army withdrew from Afghanistan. Despite the Soviet withdrawal, the Saqqawists would be defeated later, in 1929.

=== 1930s ===
==== 1933–1934: Xinjiang ====
In 1934, Ma Zhongying's troops, supported by the Kuomintang government of the Republic of China, were on the verge of defeating the Soviet client Sheng Shicai during the Battle of Ürümqi in the Kumul Rebellion. As a Hui (Chinese Muslim), he had earlier attended the Whampoa Military Academy in Nanjing in 1929, when it was run by Chiang Kai-shek, who was also the head of the Kuomintang and leader of China.^{[4][5]} He was then sent back to Gansu after graduating from the academy and fought in the Kumul Rebellion where, with the tacit support of the Kuomintang government of China, he tried to overthrow the pro-Soviet provincial government first led by Governor Jin Shuren, and then Sheng Shicai. Ma invaded Xinjiang in support of Kumul Khanate loyalists and received official approval and designation from the Kuomintang as the 36th Division.

Xinjiang in China

In late 1933, the Han Chinese provincial commander General Zhang Peiyuan and his army defected from the provincial government side to Zhongying's side and joined him in waging war against Jin Shuren's provincial government.

In 1934, two brigades of about 7,000 Soviet GPU troops, backed by tanks, airplanes and artillery with mustard gas, crossed the border to assist Sheng Shicai in gaining control of Xinjiang. The brigades were named "Altayiiskii" and "Tarbakhataiskii".^{[6]} Sheng's Manchurian army was being severely beaten by an alliance of the Han Chinese army led by general Zhang Peiyuan, and the 36th Division led by Zhongying,^{[7]} who fought under the banner of the Kuomintang Republic of China government. The joint Soviet-White Russian force was called "The Altai Volunteers". Soviet soldiers disguised themselves in uniforms lacking markings, and were dispersed among the White Russians.^{[8]}

Despite his early successes, Zhang's forces were overrun at Kulja and Chuguchak, and he committed suicide after the battle at Muzart Pass to avoid capture.

Even though the Soviets were superior to the 36th Division in both manpower and technology, they were held off for weeks and took severe casualties. The 36th Division managed to halt the Soviet forces from supplying Sheng with military equipment. Chinese Muslim troops led by Ma Shih-ming held off the superior Red Army forces armed with machine guns, tanks, and planes for about 30 days.^{[9]}

When reports that the National Revolutionary Army had defeated and killed the Soviets reached Chinese prisoners in Ürümqi, they were reportedly so jubilant that they jumped around in their cells.^{[10]}

Ma Hushan, Deputy Divisional Commander of the 36th Division, became well known for victories over Russian forces during the invasion.^{[11]}

Chiang Kai-shek was ready to send Huang Shaohong and his expeditionary force which he assembled to assist Zhongying against Sheng, but when Chiang heard about the Soviet invasion, he decided to withdraw to avoid an international incident if his troops directly engaged the Soviets.^{[12]}

==== 1936–1939: Spain ====
The newly created Second Spanish Republic became tense with political divisions between right- and left-wing politics. The 1936 Spanish general election would see the left wing coalition, called the Popular Front, win a narrow majority. As a result, the right wing, known as Falange, launched a coup against the Republic, and while they would take much territory, they would fail at taking over Spain completely, beginning the Spanish Civil War. There were two factions in the war: the right wing Nationalists, which included the Fascist Falange, Monarchists, Traditionalists, Carlists, wealthy landowners, and Conservatives, who would eventually come to be led by Francisco Franco, and the left wing Republicans, which included Anarchists, Socialists, Basque separatists, Catalan separatists, Liberals, and Communists.

The location of Spain

The Civil War would gain much international attention and both sides would gain foreign support through both volunteers and direct involvement. Both Nazi Germany and Fascist Italy gave overt support to the Nationalists. At the time, the USSR had an official policy of non-intervention, but wanted to counter Germany and Italy. Stalin worked around the League of Nations's embargo and provided arms to the Republicans and, unlike Germany and Italy, did this covertly. Arms shipment was usually slow and ineffective and many weapons were lost, but the Soviets would end up evading detection of the Nationalists by using false flags. Despite Stalin's interest in aiding the Republicans, the quality of arms was inconsistent. Many rifles and field guns provided were old, obsolete or otherwise of limited use, (some dated back to the 1860s) but the T-26 and BT-5 tanks were modern and effective in combat. The Soviet Union supplied aircraft that were in current service with their own forces but the aircraft provided by Germany to the Spanish Nationalist Air Force proved superior by the end of the war. The USSR sent 2,000–3,000 military advisers to Spain, and while the Soviet commitment of troops was fewer than 500 men at a time, Soviet volunteers often operated Soviet-made tanks and aircraft, particularly at the beginning of the war. The Republic paid for Soviet arms with official Bank of Spain gold reserves, 176 tonnes of which was transferred through France and 510 directly to Russia which was called Moscow gold. At the same time, the Soviet Union directed Communist parties around the world to organize and recruit the International Brigades.

At the same time, Stalin tried to take power within the Republicans. There were many anti-Stalin and anti-Soviet factions in the Republicans, such as Anarchists and Trotyskyists. Stalin encouraged NKVD (People's Commissariat for Internal Affairs) activity inside of the Republicans and Spain.

Catalan Trotskyist Andreu Nin, socialist journalist Mark Rein, left-wing academic José Robles, and others were assassinated in operations in Spain led by many spies and Stalinists such as Vittorio Vidali ("Comandante Contreras"), Iosif Grigulevich, Mikhail Koltsov and, most prominently, Aleksandr Mikhailovich Orlov, who later defected to the United States. The NKVD also targeted Nationalists and others they saw as politically problematic to their goals.

The Republicans eventually broke out into infighting between the communists and anarchists, as both groups attempted to form their own governments. The Nationalists, on the other hand, were much more unified than the Republicans, and Franco had been able to take most of Spain's territory, including Catalonia, an important area of left wing support and, with the collapse of Madrid, the war was over with a Nationalist victory.

==== 1939–1940: Finland ====
On 30 November 1939, the Soviet Union invaded Finland, three months after the outbreak of World War II, and ended three and a half months later with the Moscow Peace Treaty on 13 March 1940. The League of Nations deemed the attack illegal and expelled the Soviet Union from the organisation.

The location of Finland

The conflict began after the Soviets sought to obtain Finnish territory, demanding, among other concessions, that Finland cede substantial border territories in exchange for land elsewhere, claiming security reasons—primarily the protection of Leningrad, 32 km (20 mi) from the Finnish border. When Finland refused, the USSR invaded. Most sources conclude that the Soviet Union had intended to conquer all of Finland, and use the establishment of the puppet Communist Finnish Democratic Republic and the Molotov–Ribbentrop Pact's secret protocols as evidence of this. Finland repelled Soviet attacks for more than two months and inflicted substantial losses on the invaders while temperatures ranged as low as −43 °C (−45 °F).

Following the initial setbacks, the Soviets reduced their strategic objectives and put an end to the puppet Finnish communist government in late January 1940, and informed the legitimate Finnish government that they were willing to negotiate peace. After the Soviet military reorganised and adopted different tactics, they renewed their offensive in February and overcame the Finnish defences on the Karelian Isthmus.

Hostilities ceased in March 1940 with the signing of the Moscow Peace Treaty. Finland ceded 9 percent of its territory, representing 13 percent of its economy to the Soviet Union. Soviet losses were heavy, and the country's international reputation suffered. Soviet gains exceeded their pre-war demands and the USSR received substantial territory along Lake Ladoga and in northern Finland. Finland retained its sovereignty and enhanced its international reputation. The poor performance of the Red Army encouraged Adolf Hitler to think that an attack on the Soviet Union would be successful and confirmed negative Western opinions of the Soviet military. After 15 months of Interim Peace, in June 1941, Nazi Germany commenced Operation Barbarossa, and the Continuation War began.

=== 1940s ===
==== 1940: Estonia, Latvia, Lithuania ====
Planned and actual divisions of Europe, according to the Molotov–Ribbentrop Pact, with later adjustments

The Soviet Union occupied the Baltic states under the auspices of the 1939 Molotov–Ribbentrop Pact in June 1940. They were then incorporated into the Soviet Union as constituent republics in August 1940, though most Western powers never recognized their incorporation. On 22 June 1941, Nazi Germany attacked the Soviet Union and, within weeks, occupied the Baltic territories. In July 1941, the Third Reich incorporated the Baltic territory into its Reichskommissariat Ostland. As a result of the Red Army's Baltic Offensive of 1944, the Soviet Union recaptured most of the Baltic states and trapped the remaining German forces in the Courland pocket until their formal surrender in May 1945. The Soviet "annexation occupation" (German: Annexionsbesetzung) or occupation sui generis of the Baltic states lasted until August 1991, when the three countries regained their independence.

The Baltic states themselves, the United States and its courts of law, the European Parliament, the European Court of Human Rights and the United Nations Human Rights Council have all stated that these three countries were invaded, occupied and illegally incorporated into the Soviet Union under provisions of the 1939 Molotov–Ribbentrop Pact. There followed occupation by Nazi Germany from 1941 to 1944 and then again occupation by the Soviet Union from 1944 to 1991. This policy of non-recognition has given rise to the principle of legal continuity of the Baltic states, which holds that de jure, or as a matter of law, the Baltic states had remained independent states under illegal occupation throughout the period from 1940 to 1991.

In its reassessment of Soviet history that began during perestroika in 1989, the Soviet Union condemned the 1939 secret protocol between Germany and itself. However, the Soviet Union never formally acknowledged its presence in the Baltics as an occupation or that it annexed these states and considered the Estonian, Latvian and Lithuanian Soviet Socialist Republics as three of its constituent republics. On the other hand, the Russian Soviet Federative Socialist Republic recognized in 1991 that the events of 1940 were "annexation[s]". Nationalist-patriotic Russian historiography and school textbooks continue to maintain that the Baltic states voluntarily joined the Soviet Union after their peoples all carried out socialist revolutions independent of Soviet influence. The post-Soviet government of the Russian Federation and its state officials insist that incorporation of the Baltic states was in accordance with international law and gained de jure recognition by the agreements made in the February 1945 Yalta Conference, the July–August 1945 Potsdam Conference, and by the 1975 Helsinki Accords, which declared the inviolability of existing frontiers. However, Russia agreed to Europe's demand to "assist persons deported from the occupied Baltic states" upon joining the Council of Europe in 1996. Additionally, when the Russian Soviet Federative Socialist Republic signed a separate treaty with Lithuania in 1991, it acknowledged that the 1940 annexation as a violation of Lithuanian sovereignty and recognized the de jure continuity of the Lithuanian state.

Most Western governments maintained that Baltic sovereignty had not been legitimately overridden and thus continued to recognise the Baltic states as sovereign political entities represented by the legations—appointed by the pre-1940 Baltic states—which functioned in Washington and elsewhere. The Baltic states recovered de facto independence in 1991 during the dissolution of the Soviet Union. The Russian Armed Forces started to withdraw its troops from the Baltics (starting from Lithuania) in August 1993. The full withdrawal of troops deployed by Moscow ended in August 1994. Russia officially ended its military presence in the Baltics in August 1998 by decommissioning the Skrunda-1 radar station in Latvia. The dismantled installations were repatriated to Russia and the site returned to Latvian control, with the last Russian soldier leaving Baltic soil in October 1999.

== 1941–1949: World War II, formation of East Bloc, creation of Soviet satellite states, last years of Stalin's rule ==
The Soviet Union policy during World War II was neutral until August 1939, followed by friendly relations with Germany to carve up Eastern Europe. The USSR helped supply oil and munitions to Germany as its armies rolled across Western Europe in May–June 1940. Despite repeated warnings, Stalin refused to believe that Hitler was planning an all-out war on the USSR; he was stunned and temporarily helpless when Hitler invaded in June 1941. Stalin quickly came to terms with Britain and the United States, cemented through a series of summit meetings. The two countries supplied war materials in large quantity through Lend Lease. There was some coordination of military action, especially in summer 1944.

As agreed with the Allies at the Tehran Conference in November 1943 and the Yalta Conference in February 1945, the Soviet Union entered World War II's Pacific Theater within three months of the end of the war in Europe. The invasion began on 9 August 1945, exactly three months after the German surrender on May 8 (9 May, 0:43 Moscow Time). Although the commencement of the invasion fell between the American atomic bombing of Hiroshima, on 6 August, and only hours before the Nagasaki bombing on 9 August, the timing of the invasion had been planned well in advance and was determined by the timing of the agreements at Tehran and Yalta, the long-term buildup of Soviet forces in the Far East since Tehran, and the date of the German surrender some three months earlier; on 3 August, Marshal Vasilevsky reported to Premier Joseph Stalin that, if necessary, he could attack on the morning of 5 August. At 11 pm Trans-Baikal (UTC+10) time on 8 August 1945, Soviet foreign minister Vyacheslav Molotov informed Japanese ambassador Naotake Satō that the Soviet Union had declared war on Japan, and that from 9 August the Soviet government would consider itself to be at war with Japan.

=== 1940s ===
The location of Iran, in its region

==== 1941: Iran ====
The British Commonwealth and the Soviet Union invaded Pahlavi Iran jointly in 1941 during the Second World War. The invasion lasted from 25 August to 17 September 1941 and was codenamed Operation Countenance. Its purpose was to secure Iranian oil fields and ensure Allied supply lines (see the Persian Corridor) for the USSR, fighting against Axis forces on the Eastern Front. Though Iran was neutral, the Allies considered Reza Shah to be friendly to Germany, deposed him during the subsequent occupation and replaced him with his young son Mohammad Reza Pahlavi.

==== 1944–1947: Romania ====
Location of Romania

As World War II turned against the Axis and the Soviet Union won on the Eastern Front, several Romanian politicians, including Mihai Antonescu and Iuliu Maniu, entered into secret negotiations with the Allies. At the time Romania was ruled over by dictator Ion Antonescu, with King Michael I as a figurehead. The Romanians had contributed a large number of troops to the front, and had hoped to regain territory and survive. After the Soviets launched a successful offensive into Romania, King Michael I met with the National Democratic Bloc to try and take over the government. He tried to get Ion Antonescu to switch sides, but he refused. The king immediately ordered his arrest and took over the government in King Michael's Coup. Romania switched sides and began fighting against the Axis. However, the Soviet Union still ended up occupying the country.

Soviet representatives pressured the king into appointing Petru Groza, the candidate put forward by the communist alliance, as the Prime Minister of Romania in March 1945. The following year, the communist-dominated alliance won 1946 Romanian general election, though the opposition accused the government of widespread fraud. The king only ruled as a figurehead, and the Romanian Communist Party took control of the country. The Paris Peace Treaties allowed the Red Army to continue to maintain troops in the country. The government forced the king to abdicate and leave the country, and afterwards abolished the Romanian monarchy. The Parliament declared the Romanian People's Republic in Bucharest, which was friendly and aligned with Moscow. The Soviet Army presence continued until 1958. Some time after that, the de-satellization of Romania would take place.

==== 1944–1946: Bulgaria ====
Location of Bulgaria

The Kingdom of Bulgaria originally joined the Axis to gain territory and be protected from the USSR. Additionally, Bulgaria wanted to fend off the communists in the country, who had influence in the army. Despite this, Bulgaria did not participate in the war very much, not joining in Operation Barbarossa and refusing to send its Jewish Population to concentration camps. However, in 1943 Tsar Boris III died, and the Axis were starting to lose on the Eastern Front. The Bulgarian government negotiated with the allies and withdrew from the war in August 1944. Despite this they refused to expel the German troops still stationed in the country. The Soviet Union responded by invading the country in September 1944, which coincided with the 1944 coup by communists. The coup saw the communist Fatherland Front take power. The new government abolished the monarchy and executed former officials of the government including 1,000 to 3,000 dissidents, war criminals, and monarchists in the People's Court, as well as exilling Tsar Simeon II. Following the 1946 Bulgarian republic referendum the People's Republic of Bulgaria was set up under the leadership of Georgi Dimitrov.

==== 1944–1946: Poland ====
The location of Poland

On 17 September 1939, the Soviet Union invaded Poland from the east, sixteen days after Germany invaded Poland from the west. Subsequent military operations lasted for the following 20 days and ended on 6 October 1939 with the two-way division and annexation of the entire territory of the Second Polish Republic by Germany and the Soviet Union. The Soviet invasion of Poland was secretly approved by Germany following the signing of the Molotov–Ribbentrop Pact on 23 August 1939.

The Red Army, which vastly outnumbered the Polish defenders, achieved its targets encountering only limited resistance. Roughly 320,000 Polish prisoners of war had been captured. The campaign of mass persecution in the newly acquired areas began immediately. In November 1939 the Soviet government annexed the entire Polish territory under its control. Around 13.5 million Polish citizens who fell under the military occupation were made into new Soviet subjects following show elections conducted by the NKVD secret police in the atmosphere of terror, the results of which were used to legitimize the use of force. A Soviet campaign of political murders and other forms of repression, targeting Polish figures of authority such as military officers, police and priests, began with a wave of arrests and summary executions. The Soviet NKVD sent hundreds of thousands of people from eastern Poland to Siberia and other remote parts of the Soviet Union in four major waves of deportation between 1939 and 1941. (Note: The exact number of people deported between 1939 and 1941 remains unknown. Estimates vary between 350,000 and more than 1.5 million; Rummel estimates the number at 1.2 million, and Kushner and Knox 1.5 million.)

Soviet forces occupied eastern Poland until the summer of 1941, when they were driven out by the Wehrmacht in the course of Operation Barbarossa. The area was under German occupation until the Red Army reconquered it in the summer of 1944. An agreement at the Yalta Conference permitted the Soviet Union to annex almost all of their Molotov–Ribbentrop Pact portion of the Second Polish Republic, compensating the Polish People's Republic with the southern half of East Prussia and territories east of the Oder–Neisse line. The Soviet Union enclosed most of the conquered annexed territories into the Ukrainian Soviet Socialist Republic and the Byelorussian Soviet Socialist Republic.

After the end of World War II in Europe, the USSR signed a new border agreement with the Soviet-backed and installed Polish communist puppet state on 16 August 1945. This agreement recognized the status quo as the new official border between the two countries with the exception of the region around Białystok and a minor part of Galicia east of the San river around Przemyśl, which were later returned to Poland.

==== 1945–1949: Hungary ====
As the allies were on their way to victory in World War II, Hungary was governed by the Hungarist Arrow Cross Party under the Government of National Unity. They were facing mostly advancing Soviet and Romanian forces. On 13 February 1945 the forces captured Budapest, by April 1945 German forces were driven out of the country. They occupied the country and set it up as a Satellite State called the Second Hungarian Republic. In the 1945 Hungarian parliamentary election the Independent Smallholders Party won 57% of the vote while the Hungarian Communist Party won only 17%. In response the Soviet forces refused to allow the party to take power, and the communists took control of the government in a coup. Their rule saw the Stalinization of the country, and with the help of the USSR sent dissidents to Gulags in the Soviet Union, as well as setting up the Security Police known as the State Protection Authority (AVO). In February 1947 the police began targeting member of the Independent Smallholders Party and the National Peasants Party. As well in 1947 the Hungarian government forced the leaders of non-communist parties to cooperate with the government. The Social Democratic Party of Hungary was taken over while the Secretary of Independent Smallholders Party was sent to Siberia. In June 1948 the Social Democrats were forced to fuse with the communists to form the Hungarian Working People's Party. In the 1949 Hungarian parliamentary elections the voters were only presented with a list of communist candidates and the Hungarian government drafted a new constitution from the 1936 Soviet Constitution, and made themselves into the People's Republic of Hungary with Matyas Rakosi as the de facto leader.

==== 1945: Germany ====
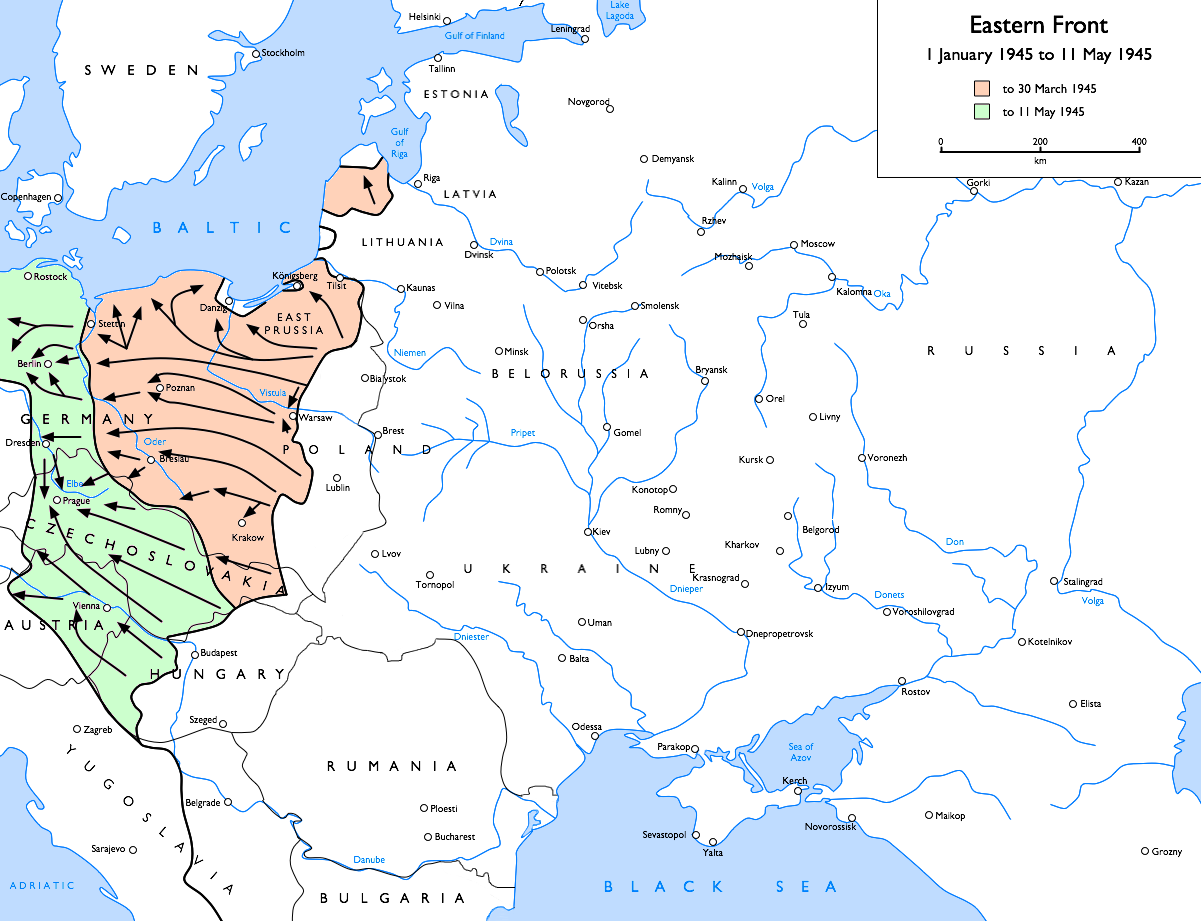
Soviet advances from 1 January 1945 to 11 May 1945: to 30 March 1945 to 11 May 1945

The Soviet Union entered Warsaw on 17 January 1945, after the city was destroyed and abandoned by the Germans after the Warsaw Uprising. Over three days, on a broad front incorporating four army fronts, the Red Army launched the Vistula–Oder Offensive across the Narew River and from Warsaw. The Soviets outnumbered the Germans on average by 5–6:1 in troops, 6:1 in artillery, 6:1 in tanks and 4:1 in self-propelled artillery. After four days, the Red Army broke out and started moving thirty to forty kilometres a day, taking the Baltic states: Danzig, East Prussia and Poznań, and drawing up on a line sixty kilometres east of Berlin along the River Oder. During the full course of the Vistula–Oder operation (23 days), the Red Army forces sustained 194,191 total casualties (killed, wounded and missing) and lost 1,267 tanks and assault guns.

A limited counter-attack (codenamed Operation Solstice) by the newly created Army Group Vistula, under the command of Reichsführer-SS Heinrich Himmler, had failed by 24 February, and the Red Army drove on to Pomerania and cleared the right bank of the Oder River. In the south, the German attempts in to relieve the encircled garrison at Budapest (codenamed Operation Konrad) failed and the city fell on 13 February. On 6 March, the Germans launched what would be their final major offensive of the war, Operation Spring Awakening, which failed by 16 March. On 30 March, the Red Army entered Austria and captured Vienna on 13 April.

OKW claimed German losses of 77,000 killed, 334,000 wounded and 292,000 missing, for a total of 703,000 men, on the Eastern Front during January and February 1945.

On 9 April 1945, Königsberg in East Prussia finally fell to the Red Army, although the shattered remnants of Army Group Centre continued to resist on the Vistula Spit and Hel Peninsula until the end of the war in Europe. The East Prussian operation, though often overshadowed by the Vistula–Oder operation and the later battle for Berlin, was in fact one of the largest and costliest operations fought by the Red Army throughout the war. During the period it lasted (13 January – 25 April), it cost the Red Army 584,788 casualties, and 3,525 tanks and assault guns.

The fall of Königsberg allowed Stavka to free up General Konstantin Rokossovsky's 2nd Belorussian Front (2BF) to move west to the east bank of the Oder. During the first two weeks of April, the Red Army performed their fastest front redeployment of the war. General Georgy Zhukov concentrated his 1st Belorussian Front (1BF), which had been deployed along the Oder river from Frankfurt in the south to the Baltic, into an area in front of the Seelow Heights. The 2BF moved into the positions being vacated by the 1BF north of the Seelow Heights. While this redeployment was in progress gaps were left in the lines and the remnants of the German 2nd Army, which had been bottled up in a pocket near Danzig, managed to escape across the Oder. To the south, General Ivan Konev shifted the main weight of the 1st Ukrainian Front (1UF) out of Upper Silesia north-west to the Neisse River. The three Soviet fronts had altogether around 2.5 million men (including 78,556 soldiers of the 1st Polish Army): 6,250 tanks, 7,500 aircraft, 41,600 artillery pieces and mortars, 3,255 truck-mounted Katyusha rocket launchers, (nicknamed "Stalin Organs"), and 95,383 motor vehicles, many of which were manufactured in the USA.

==== 1945–1950: China ====
On 9 August 1945, the Soviet Union invaded the Japanese puppet state of Manchukuo. It was the last campaign of the Second World War, and the largest of the 1945 Soviet–Japanese War, which resumed hostilities between the Union of Soviet Socialist Republics and the Empire of Japan after almost six years of peace. Soviet gains on the continent were Manchukuo, Mengjiang (Inner Mongolia) and northern Korea. The Soviet entry into the war and the defeat of the Kwantung Army was a significant factor in the Japanese government's decision to surrender unconditionally, as it made apparent the Soviet Union had no intention of acting as a third party in negotiating an end to hostilities on conditional terms.

At the same time tensions were starting to resurface between the Chinese Communist Party (CCP) and the Kuomintang (KMT), known as the Communists and Nationalists respectively. The two groups had stopped fighting to form the Second United Front to fend off the Japanese Empire. During the Second Sino-Japanese War the CCP gained many members due to their success against the Japanese. The fighting caused the United Front to be dissolved in 1941. Through the war with the Japanese there were tensions and incidents of fighting, however the USSR and the USA made sure that they stayed at enough peace to stop the Japanese from winning the war. In March 1946 the USSR would withdraw leaving most of Manchuria to the Communists. As well the USSR handed over most of the weapons to the CCP that they had captured from the Japanese. Fighting commenced between the two groups and a war began that would last for three years.

The Communists were able to start gaining ground and by 1948 they were pushing the Nationalists out and taking more and more of China. The USSR continued to give aid to the CCP and even helped them in taking Xinjiang from the Nationalists. In October 1949 Mao Zedong, the leader of the communists, proclaimed the People's Republic of China effectively ending the civil war. In May 1950 the last of the KMT had been completely pushed off of mainland China and Chiang Kai-shek, the leader of the Nationalists, retreated to Taiwan and formed the Republic of China. Both mainland China and the USSR stayed good allies until the Sino-Soviet split after Stalin's death.

==== 1945–1953: Korea ====
Korea in its region

The 1948 Korean elections were overseen primarily by the United Nations Temporary Commission on Korea, or UNTCOK. The Soviet Union forbade the elections in the north of the peninsula, while the United States planned to hold separate elections in the south of the peninsula, a plan which was opposed by Australia, Canada and Syria as members of the commission. According to Gordenker, the commission acted:

in such a way as to affect the controlling political decisions regarding elections in Korea. Moreover, UNTCOK deliberately and directly took a hand in the conduct of the 1948 election.

Faced with this, UNTCOK eventually recommended the election take place only in the south, but that the results would be binding on all of Korea.

In June 1950, Kim Il Sung's North Korean People's Army invaded South Korea.^{[58]} Fearing that communist Korea under a Kim Il Sung dictatorship could threaten Japan and foster other communist movements in Asia, Harry Truman, then President of the United States, committed U.S. forces and obtained help from the United Nations to counter the North Korean invasion. The Soviets boycotted UN Security Council meetings while protesting the council's failure to seat the People's Republic of China and, thus, did not veto the council's approval of UN action to oppose the North Korean invasion. A joint United Nations Command force of personnel from South Korea, the United States, Britain, Turkey, Canada, Australia, France, the Philippines, the Netherlands, Belgium, New Zealand, and other countries joined to stop the invasion.^{[59]} After a Chinese invasion to assist the North Koreans, fighting stabilized along the 38th parallel, which had separated the Koreas. The Korean Armistice Agreement was signed in July 1953 after the death of Joseph Stalin, who had been insisting that the North Koreans continue fighting.^{[60]}

==== 1948: Czechoslovakia ====
Following World War II, the Third Czechoslovak Republic was under the influence of the USSR and, during the 1946 Czechoslovak parliamentary election, the Communist Party of Czechoslovakia would win 38% of the vote. The communists had been alienating many citizens in Czechoslovakia due to the use of the police force and talks of collectivization of a number of industries. Stalin was against democratic ways of taking power since the communist parties in Italy and France had failed to take power. In the winter of 1947, the communist party decided to stage a coup; the USSR would come to support them. The non-communists attempted to act before the communists took the police force completely, but the communists occupied the offices of non-communists. The Czechoslovak Army, under the direction of Defence Minister Ludvík Svoboda, who was formally non-partisan but had facilitated communist infiltration into the officer corps, was confined to barracks and did not interfere. The communists threatened a general strike too. Edvard Benes, fearing direct Soviet intervention and a civil war, surrendered and resigned.

==== 1948–1949: Yugoslavia ====
The location of Yugoslavia

During World War II, the communist Yugoslav Partisans had been the main resistance to the Axis occupation of Yugoslavia. As the axis were defeated the Partisans took power and Josef Broz Tito became the head of Democratic Federal Yugoslavia. This had been done without much Soviet help, so Tito was allowed to and did run his own path in defiance to Stalin. Economically, he implemented a different view to the USSR and attempted to make Yugoslavia into a regional power by absorbing Bulgaria and Albania into Yugoslavia as well as funding the Greek Communists in the Greek Civil War, to absorb Greece too. Stalin did not approve of this and expelled Yugoslavia from the East Bloc. There was military buildup and a planned invasion in 1949 that was never put through. As well, since 1945, the USSR had a spy ring within Yugoslavia and Stalin attempted to assassinate Tito several times. Stalin remarked "I will shake my little finger and there will be no more Tito". However, these assassinations would fail, and Tito would write back to Stalin "Stop sending people to kill me. We've already captured five of them, one of them with a bomb and another with a rifle. [...] If you don't stop sending killers, I'll send one to Moscow, and I won't have to send a second." Yugoslavia would go on to become one of the main founders and leaders of the Non-Aligned Movement.

== 1952–1991: Rest of the Cold War ==
=== 1950s ===
==== 1956: Hungary ====
The location of Hungary

After Stalinist dictator Mátyás Rákosi was replaced by Imre Nagy following Stalin's death and Polish reformist Władysław Gomułka was able to enact some reformist requests,^{[45]} large numbers of protesting Hungarians compiled a list of Demands of Hungarian Revolutionaries of 1956,^{[46]} including free secret-ballot elections, independent tribunals, and inquiries into Stalin and Rákosi Hungarian activities. Under the orders of Soviet defense minister Georgy Zhukov, Soviet Army tanks entered Budapest.^{[47]} Protester attacks at the Hungarian Parliament Building forced the collapse of the government.^{[48]}

The new government that came to power during the revolution formally disbanded the Hungarian State Protection Authority, declared its intention to withdraw from the Warsaw Pact and pledged to re-establish free elections. The Soviet Politburo thereafter moved to crush the revolution with a large Soviet force invading Budapest and other regions of the country.^{[49]} Approximately 200,000 Hungarians fled Hungary,^{[50]} some 26,000 Hungarians were put on trial by the new Soviet-installed János Kádár government and, of those, 13,000 were imprisoned.^{[51]} Imre Nagy was executed, along with Pál Maléter and Miklós Gimes, after secret trials in June 1958. By January 1957, the Hungarian government had suppressed all public opposition. These Hungarian government's violent oppressive actions alienated many Western Marxists, yet strengthened communist control in all the European communist states, cultivating the perception that communism was both irreversible and monolithic.

==== 1959–1975: Vietnam ====
Some 3,300 Soviet military experts, among them Spetsnaz, were sent to Southeast Asia during the Vietnam War. Within South Vietnam, rumors persisted for years that men with blue eyes were reportedly spotted doing recon missions and testing their new SVD Dragunov sniper rifles. John Stryker Meyer was with Studies and Observation Group RT Idaho and had two encounters with what they believed were spetsnaz units operating in Laos in 1968.

Their mission was twofold. One, help a communist nation defeat an American ally and two, test and evaluate their most sophisticated radars and missiles directly against the best American aircraft had to offer. Soviets recovered at least 2 very important American intelligence gear, a cryptographic code machine and an F-111A escape capsule, which now sits in a Moscow Museum.

=== 1960s ===
==== 1961–1965: Congo-Leopoldville ====
The Simba Rebellion (green) and The Kwilu Rebellion (yellow) in Congo-Leopoldville

In 1960, Belgium, the United States, and other countries covertly overthrew Prime Minister Patrice Lumumba in a coup led by Mobutu Sese Seko. Afterwards, Seko began getting support from the US. Many politicians who had been allied to Lumumba were forced out of government. Many Lumumba-allied politicians began to foment discontent and dissent. They formed a new government in Stanleyville in the East of the country called the Free Republic of Congo with the support of the Soviet Union. The supporters of Lumumba eventually agreed to join back however they felt cheated on after and turned again against Mobutu in a more violent form of resistance. Maoist Pierre Mulele began the Kwilu Rebellion, soon after Christopher Gbenye and Gaston Soumialot led the APL (Armée Populaire de Libération), also known as the Simbas, in the Eastern Congo in the Simba rebellion.

Mobutu was already receiving assistance from the United States, and the Simbas began to receive funding from the USSR along with other countries also aligned with it. The Soviet Union implored neighboring nationalistic governments to aid the rebels. The Soviet leadership promised that it would replace all weaponry given to the Simbas but rarely did so. To supply the rebels, the Soviet Union transported equipment by air to Juba in allied Sudan. From there, the Sudanese brought the weapons to Congo. This operation backfired, however, as Southern Sudan was invaded in the First Sudanese Civil War. The Sudanese Anyanya insurgents consequently ambushed the Soviet-Sudanese supply convoys and took the weapons for themselves. When the CIA learned of these attacks, it allied with the Anyanya. The Anyanya helped the Western and Congolese air forces locate and destroy Simba rebel camps and supply routes. In return, the Sudanese rebels were given weapons for their own war. Angered by the Soviet support for the insurgents, the Congolese government expelled the Soviet embassy's personnel from the country in July 1964. The Soviet leadership responded by increasing its aid for the Simbas. As well in 1965 Che Guevara went and fought alongside future leader of the Democratic Republic of Congo, Laurent-Desire Kabila.

However the rebellion would begin to collapse for a variety of reasons including bad coordination and relations with the USSR, the Sino-Soviet split, support for Mobutu by the US and Belgium, counter insurgent tactics, and many other reasons. While it would be crushed the Simbas still held parts of the Eastern Congo and resisted the government until 1996 during the First Congo War.

==== 1967–1970: Nigeria ====
During the Nigerian Civil War, the Republic of Biafra declared independence from Nigeria and attempted to secede. The Soviet Union served as a primary supplier of military aid to the Nigerian federal government. Biafran civilians were indiscriminately being bombed by Soviet planes while the Nigerian military formed a blockade around Biafra that starved millions of Biafran civilians to death.

==== 1965–1979: Rhodesia ====
Location of Rhodesia, today the Republic of Zimbabwe

By the end of the nineteenth Century, the British Empire had control of much of Southern Africa. This included the three colonies of Northern Rhodesia and Southern Rhodesia, named for Cecil Rhodes, and Nyasaland, which formed the Federation of Rhodesia and Nyasaland. Northern Rhodesia would go on to become independent as Zambia and Nyasaland would become Malawi. A white minority had ruled Southern Rhodesia since World War II. However, the British had made a policy of majority rule as a condition of independence, and Southern Rhodesia's white minority still wanted to maintain power. On 11 November 1965, Southern Rhodesia unilaterally declared independence and formed Rhodesia.

In Rhodesia, the white minority still held political power and held most of the country's wealth, while being led by Ian Smith. Rhodesia would gain very little recognition across the world, though it would have some covert support. Two main armed groups rose up to overthrow the white minority in 1964, a year before Rhodesia's declaration of independence. Both were Marxist organizations that got support from different sides of the Sino-Soviet split. One was ZANU (Zimbabwe African National Union), who organized rural areas, and thus got support from China. The other was ZAPU (Zimbabwe African People's Union), who organized primarily urban areas, thus getting support from the USSR. ZIPRA (Zimbabwe People's Revolutionary Army), the armed wing of ZAPU, took advice from its Soviet instructors in formulating its vision and strategy of popular revolution. About 1,400 Soviets, 700 East German and 500 Cuban instructors were deployed to the area. While both groups fought against the Rhodesian government, they would also sometimes fight each other. The fighting began a year before Rhodesian independence.

Rhodesia was not able to survive the war as into the 1970s guerilla activity began to intensify. Eventually, a compromise was reached in 1978 where the country was renamed Zimbabwe-Rhodesia. This was still seen as not enough and the war would continue. Then, after a brief British recolonization, Zimbabwe was created, with ZANU leader Robert Mugabe elected as president. In the 1980 election, ZAPU would not win a majority; they would later fuse with ZANU in 1987 into ZANU-PF. They are now split.

==== 1968: Czechoslovakia ====
Location of Czechoslovakia

A period of political liberalization took place in 1968 in Czechoslovakia called the Prague Spring. The event was spurred by several events, including economic reforms that addressed an early 1960s economic downturn. In April, Czechoslovak leader Alexander Dubček launched an "Action Program" of liberalizations, which included increasing freedom of the press, freedom of speech and freedom of movement, along with an economic emphasis on consumer goods, the possibility of a multiparty government and limiting the power of the secret police. Initial reaction within the Eastern Bloc was mixed, with Hungary's János Kádár expressing support, while Soviet leader Leonid Brezhnev and others grew concerned about Dubček's reforms, which they feared might weaken the Eastern Bloc's position during the Cold War. On 3 August, representatives from the Soviet Union, East Germany, Poland, Hungary, Bulgaria, and Czechoslovakia met in Bratislava and signed the Bratislava Declaration, which declaration affirmed unshakable fidelity to Marxism-Leninism and proletarian internationalism and declared an implacable struggle against "bourgeois" ideology and all "anti-socialist" forces.

On the night of 20–21 August 1968, Eastern Bloc armies from four Warsaw Pact countries – the Soviet Union, Bulgaria, Poland and Hungary – invaded Czechoslovakia. The invasion comported with the Brezhnev Doctrine, a policy of compelling Eastern Bloc states to subordinate national interests to those of the Bloc as a whole and the exercise of a Soviet right to intervene if an Eastern Bloc country appeared to shift towards capitalism. The invasion was followed by a wave of emigration, including an estimated 70,000 Czechs initially fleeing, with the total eventually reaching 300,000. In April 1969, Dubček was replaced as first secretary by Gustáv Husák, and a period of "normalization" began. Husák reversed Dubček's reforms, purged the party of liberal members, dismissed opponents from public office, reinstated the power of the police authorities, sought to re-centralize the economy and re-instated the disallowance of political commentary in mainstream media and by persons not considered to have "full political trust". The international image of the Soviet Union suffered considerably, especially among Western student movements inspired by the "New Left" and non-Aligned Movement states. Mao Zedong's People's Republic of China, for example, condemned both the Soviets and the Americans as imperialists.

=== 1970s ===
==== 1978–1979: Cambodia ====
Location of Cambodia

In the years after the Vietnam War, the Socialist Republic of Vietnam and the Democratic Kampuchea had been trying to build relations between one another. The Democratic Kampuchea was the government of Cambodia under the rule of Pol Pot and the Khmer Rouge. While both countries tried to maintain good relations they both were still suspicious of each other and fought in occasional border skirmishes. In 1977 relations fully deteriorated, and in 1978 this would all come to a head. On 25 December 1978 Vietnam invaded the country to remove the Khmer Rouge from power.

The Vietnamese invasion of Cambodia was supported by the Soviet Union who ended up sending them $1.4 billion in military aid for their invasion, and between 1981 and 1985 peaked at $1.7 billion. The Soviet Union also provided Vietnam with a total of $5.4 billion to alleviate sanctions and help with their third five-year plan (1981–1985). Additionally, the Soviets provided 90% of Vietnam's demand for raw materials and 70% of its grain imports. At the United Nations, Soviet delegates vetoed many resolutions that attempted to penalize Vietnam with sanctions or were otherwise critical of its invasion of Cambodia.

Even though the figures suggest the Soviet Union was a reliable ally, privately Soviet leaders were dissatisfied with Hanoi's handling of the stalemate in Kampuchea and resented the burden of their aid program to Vietnam as their own country was undergoing Đổi Mới economic reforms. In 1986, the Soviet government announced that it would reduce aid to friendly nations; for Vietnam, those reductions meant the loss of 20% of its economic aid and one-third of its military aid. Following the invasion, Vietnam attempted to build a new government in the country and fight a guerilla war against the Khmer Rouge. To implement the new reforms in the country, Vietnam, with support from the Soviet Union, started transferring several years' worth of military equipment to the Kampuchea People's Revolutionary Armed Forces, which numbered more than 70,000 soldiers. The Vietnamese Ministry of Defense's International Relations Department then advised its Kampuchean counterparts to only use the available equipment to maintain their current level of operations, and not to engage in major operations which could exhaust those supplies. While the Soviet Union had already started to decline by the end of Cambodia civil war, Vietnam succeeded in stabilizing the country's new regime, even though the Khmer Rouge continued its insurgency for many years thereafter.

=== 1980s ===
==== 1979–1989: Afghanistan ====
Following the Saur Revolution in 1978, the Democratic Republic of Afghanistan was established, creating a socialist government aligned with the Soviet Union. Popular backlash to this led an uprising against the new regime. By December 1979 the Soviets intervened in Operation Storm-333, overthrowing Afghan leader Hafizullah Amin and installing Babrak Karmal in his place. The Soviets participated in the ensuing Soviet–Afghan War to maintain their allied regime before eventually withdrawing in 1989. 6.5–11.5% of Afghanistan's 1979 population of 13.5 million is estimated to have died from the war.

According to declassified Soviet documents studied by the historian David N. Gibbs, Afghan officials repeatedly asked for Soviet combat personnel to help fight the mujahideen during the spring and summer of 1979, and the Soviet leadership rejected these requests. In September 1979, members of the People's Democratic Party of Afghanistan associated with Amin staged a coup and seized full power. Afghan leader Nur Muhammad Taraki was arrested and later executed. The killing angered Moscow, which began to mass combat units along its border with Afghanistan. During the autumn, leading Politburo members became convinced that Amin was shifting his allegiance away from the Soviet Union and toward the United States. A report to the Central Committee on 29 October said that Amin intended to pursue a more "balanced policy" toward the Western powers. Gibbs found no evidence in the declassified collections he examined that the United States had actively contemplated an alliance with Amin. According to the former deputy foreign minister Georgy Korniyenko, the main advocate of intervention was KGB chairman Yuri Andropov. Andropov had opposed sending combat troops during the Herat crisis in March, but by October he had set aside his objections. In discussions with other Politburo members, he described Amin as "an American agent". On 12 December 1979, five senior Politburo members formally authorized the invasion: Defense Minister Dmitry Ustinov, Foreign Minister Andrei Gromyko, party ideology chief Mikhail Suslov, Andropov and Soviet leader Leonid Brezhnev. The invasion took place between 24 and 27 December. Amin was killed during the operation, and Parcham leader Karmal was flown back from exile and placed in power.

== See also ==
- Foreign interventions by the Soviet Union
- List of heads of state and government deposed by foreign powers in the 20th and 21st century
- Russian involvement in regime change
- United States involvement in regime change

== Sources ==
- Abbott, Peter (2014). Modern African Wars (4): The Congo 1960–2002. Oxford; New York City: Osprey Publishing. ISBN 978-1-78200-076-1.
- Crampton, R. J. (1997), Eastern Europe in the twentieth century and after, Routledge, ISBN 0-415-16422-2
- Crampton, R. J. (2005). A Concise History of Bulgaria. Cambridge University Press. ISBN 978-0-521-61637-9.
- Curtis, Glenn E.; Mitova, Pamela; Marsteller, William; Soper, Karl Wheeler (1992). Country Study: Bulgaria. Library of Congress. Archived from the original on 23 July 2019 – via Library of Congress Country Studies.
  - "Bulgaria in World War II: The Passive Alliance". World War II. Archived from the original on 21 September 2008.
  - "Wartime Crisis". World War II. Archived from the original on 20 September 2008.
  - "The Soviet Occupation". World War II. Archived from the original on 21 September 2008.
- Gibbs, David N. (2006). "Reassessing Soviet Motives for Invading Afghanistan: A Declassified History". Critical Asian Studies. 38 (2): 239–263. doi:10.1080/14672710600671228.
- Goertz, Gary (1995), Contexts of International Politics, Cambridge University Press, ISBN 0-521-46972-4
- Grenville, John Ashley Soames (2005), A History of the World from the 20th to the 21st Century, Routledge, ISBN 0-415-28954-8
- Martell, Peter (2018). First Raise a Flag. London: Hurst & Company. ISBN 978-1849049597.
- Navrátil, Jaromír (2006), The Prague Spring 1968: A National Security Archive Document Reader (National Security Archive Cold War Readers), Central European University Press, ISBN 963-7326-67-7
- Prunier, Gérard (2009). Africa's World War : Congo, the Rwandan Genocide, and the Making of a Continental Catastrophe: Congo, the Rwandan Genocide, and the Making of a Continental Catastrophe. Oxford: Oxford University Press. ISBN 978-0-19-970583-2.
- Rodgers, Anthony (1998). Someone Else's War. Harper-Collins.
- Traugott, M. (1979). The Economic Origins of the Kwilu Rebellion. Comparative Studies in Society and History, 21(3), 459–479. Retrieved from http://www.jstor.org/stable/178542 Archived 31 July 2023 at the Wayback Machine
- Villafana, Frank (2017) [1st pub. 2009]. Cold War in the Congo: The Confrontation of Cuban Military Forces, 1960-1967. Abingdon; New York City: Routledge. ISBN 978-1-4128-4766-7.
- Williams, Kieran (1997), The Prague Spring and its Aftermath: Czechoslovak Politics, 1968–1970, Cambridge University Press, ISBN 0-521-58803-0
