= Soviet interference in the United States elections, 1960s-1980s =

The Soviet government conducted foreign electoral interference starting in the 1960 United States elections with the goal of helping John F. Kennedy defeat Richard Nixon, whom they perceived as less aligned with their interests, and to create discord in the US. It also attacked figures such as Barry Goldwater, Lyndon Johnson, J. Edgar Hoover, Martin Luther King Jr., and Senator Henry "Scoop" Jackson. David Shimer has interviewed Oleg Kalugin recollecting that the KGB particularly targeted Jewish Americans and Black Americans, including a fake letter from the Ku Klux Klan, and accused Jackson and Hoover of being closeted homosexuals. The KGB sent anonymous antisemitic letters to Jewish Americans and arranged for swastikas to be painted on synagogues. The KGB offered aid to Adlai Stevenson and Anatoli Dobrynin offered covert aid to Hubert Humphrey's campaign. Efforts continued to undermine the reelection of the perceived Cold Warrior Ronald Reagan in 1983–1984.

Nikita Khrushchev, fearing Nixon was a McCarthyite and a hawk, proposed to Aleksandr Semyonovich Feklisov, resident spy in Washington, to take active measures through diplomatic means or propaganda to help Kennedy, and to facilitate contact with Robert F. Kennedy, which was not successful.

== See also ==
- 1984 United States presidential election
- Soviet involvement in regime change
- Foreign interventions by the Soviet Union
- Russian involvement in regime change
- Russia–United States relations
- Richard Nixon 1968 presidential campaign
- Kitchen Debate
- Moscow–Washington hotline
