= Foreign interventions by the Soviet Union =

Eastern Bloc

Over the course of its history, the Soviet Union intervened in foreign countries on numerous occasions.

== Invasions of Afghanistan (1929-1930) ==
Two Soviet invasions of Afghanistan took place between 1929 and 1930.

The first intervention was a special operation aimed at supporting the ousted king of Afghanistan, Amanullah Khan, in a civil war against the Saqqawists and Basmachi. The Soviets occupied the Balkh Province however they withdrew after the King fled the country. Thus, the Saqqawists took control in January 1929.

The second intervention took place after the Afghan Saqqawist government allowed Basmachi insurgents (an anti-Russian Islamic movement) to operate from northern Afghanistan against the Soviets. Despite the overthrow of Saqqadist government in October 1929 and restoration of the monarchy, Basmachi bases remained in northern Afghanistan with threats of declaring independence from Afghanistan. As such the new Afghan government agreed to a Soviet intervention by June 1930. The result was the Basmachi bases largely being destroyed.

== Invasion of China (1934) ==
In 1934, Ma Zhongying's troops, supported by the Kuomintang government of the Republic of China were on the verge of defeating the Soviet client Sheng Shicai during the Battle of Ürümqi (1933–34) in the Kumul Rebellion.

Ma Zhongying, a Hui (Chinese Muslim), had earlier attended the Whampoa Military Academy in Nanjing in 1929, when it was run by Chiang Kai-shek, who was also the head of the Kuomintang and leader of China.

Ma Zhongying then was sent back to Gansu after graduating from the academy and fought in the Kumul Rebellion where, with the tacit support of the Kuomintang government of China, he tried to overthrow the pro-Soviet provincial government first led by Governor Jin Shuren then Sheng Shicai. Ma invaded Xinjiang in support of Kumul Khanate loyalists and received official approval and designation from the Kuomintang as the 36th Division.

In late 1933, the Han Chinese provincial commander General Zhang Peiyuan and his army defected from the provincial government side to Ma Zhongying's side and joined him in waging war against Jin Shuren's provincial government.

In 1934, two brigades of about 7,000 Soviet GPU troops, backed by tanks, airplanes and artillery with mustard gas, crossed the border to assist Sheng Shicai in gaining control of Xinjiang. The brigades were named "Altayiiskii" and "Tarbakhataiskii". Sheng's Manchurian army was being severely beaten by an alliance of the Han Chinese army led by general Zhang Peiyuan, and the 36th Division led by Ma Zhongying. Ma fought under the banner of the Kuomintang Republic of China government. The joint Soviet-White Russian force was called "The Altai Volunteers". Soviet soldiers disguised themselves in uniforms lacking markings, and were dispersed among the White Russians.

Despite his early successes, Zhang's forces were overrun at Kulja and Chuguchak, and he committed suicide after the battle at Muzart Pass to avoid capture.

Even though the Soviets were superior to the 36th Division in both manpower and technology, they were held off for weeks and took severe casualties. The 36th Division managed to halt the Soviet forces from supplying Sheng with military equipment. Chinese Muslim troops led by Ma Shih-ming managed to hold off the superior Red Army forces armed with machine guns, tanks, and planes for about 30 days.

Ma Hushan, Deputy Divisional Commander of the 36th division, became well known for victories over Russian forces during the invasion.

At this point, Chiang Kai-shek was ready to send Huang Shaohong and his expeditionary force which he assembled to assist Ma Zhongying against Sheng, but when Chiang heard about the Soviet invasion, he decided to withdraw to avoid an international incident if his troops directly engaged the Soviets.

During the Islamic rebellion in Xinjiang In August 1937, the Soviet Red Army sent 5000 troops, backed by an air unit and an armored regiment into Xinjiang at the request of Sheng Shicai, the aircraft assisted the provincial forces by dropping bombs, including some containing mustard gas, On October 15 the Soviets bombed the city of Hotan, which resulted in 2,000 casualties.

== Winter War (1939–1940) ==
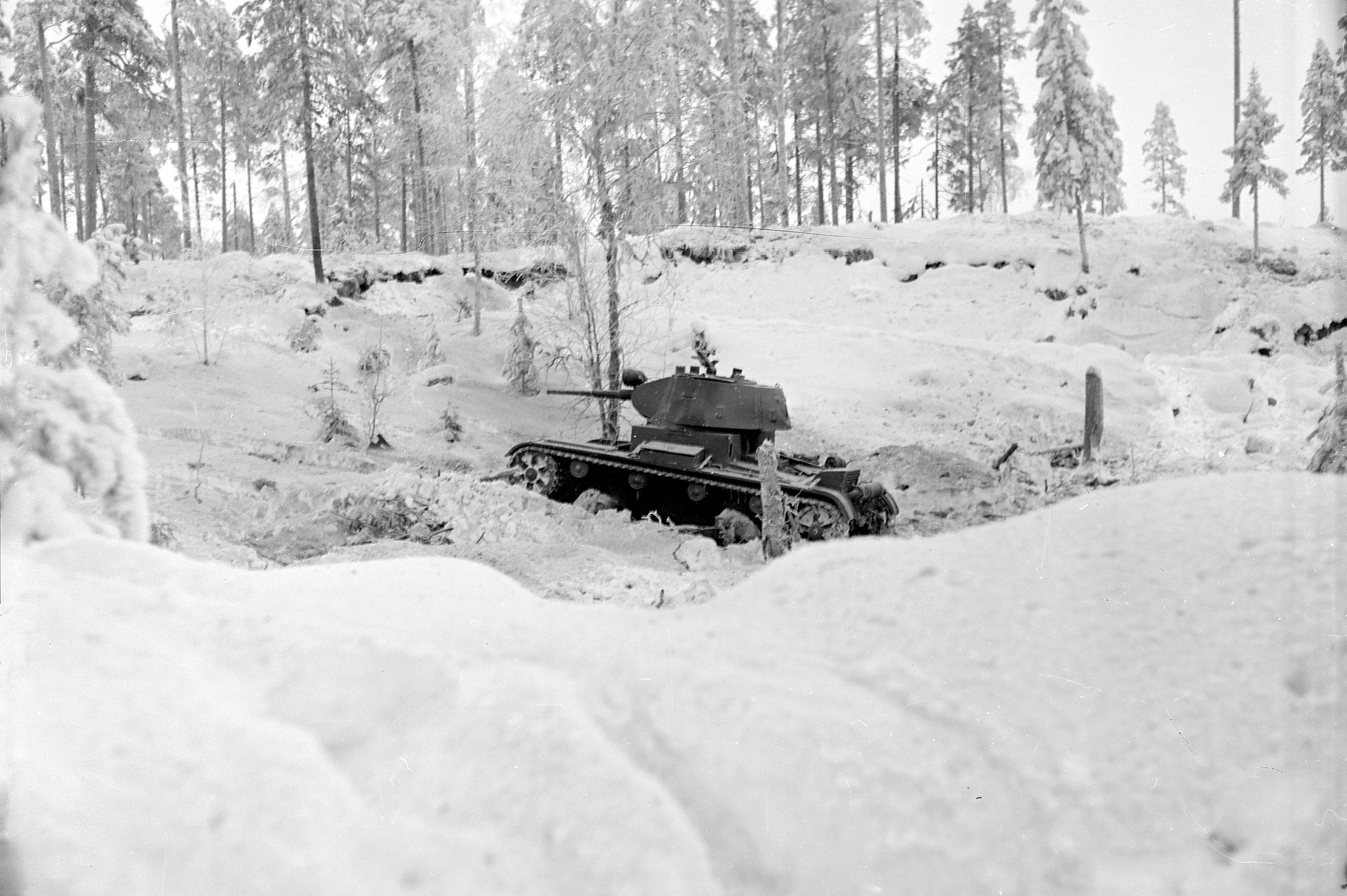
Soviet T-26 Model 1937 "advancing aggressively", as described by the photographer, on the eastern side of Kollaa River during the Battle of Kollaa

On 30 November 1939, the Soviet Union invaded Finland, three months after the outbreak of World War II, and ended three and a half months later with the Moscow Peace Treaty on 13 March 1940. The League of Nations deemed the attack illegal and expelled the Soviet Union from the organisation.

The conflict began after the Soviets sought to obtain some Finnish territory, demanding among other concessions that Finland cede substantial border territories in exchange for land elsewhere, claiming security reasons—primarily the protection of Leningrad, 32 km (20 mi) from the Finnish border. Finland refused, so the USSR invaded the country. Many sources conclude that the Soviet Union had intended to conquer all of Finland, and use the establishment of the puppet Finnish Communist government and the Molotov–Ribbentrop Pact's secret protocols as evidence of this, (Note: See the relevant section and the following sources:) while other sources argue against the idea of the full Soviet conquest. (Note: See the relevant section and the following sources:) Finland repelled Soviet attacks for more than two months and inflicted substantial losses on the invaders while temperatures ranged as low as −43 °C (−45 °F). After the Soviet military reorganised and adopted different tactics, they renewed their offensive in February and overcame Finnish defences.

Hostilities ceased in March 1940 with the signing of the Moscow Peace Treaty. Finland ceded 11 percent of its territory representing 30 percent of its economy to the Soviet Union. Soviet losses were heavy, and the country's international reputation suffered. Soviet gains exceeded their pre-war demands and the USSR received substantial territory along Lake Ladoga and in northern Finland. Finland retained its sovereignty and enhanced its international reputation. The poor performance of the Red Army encouraged Adolf Hitler to think that an attack on the Soviet Union would be successful and confirmed negative Western opinions of the Soviet military. After 15 months of Interim Peace, in June 1941, Nazi Germany commenced Operation Barbarossa and the Soviet-Finnish theater of World War II, also known as the Continuation War, flared up again.

== World War II (1939–1945) ==
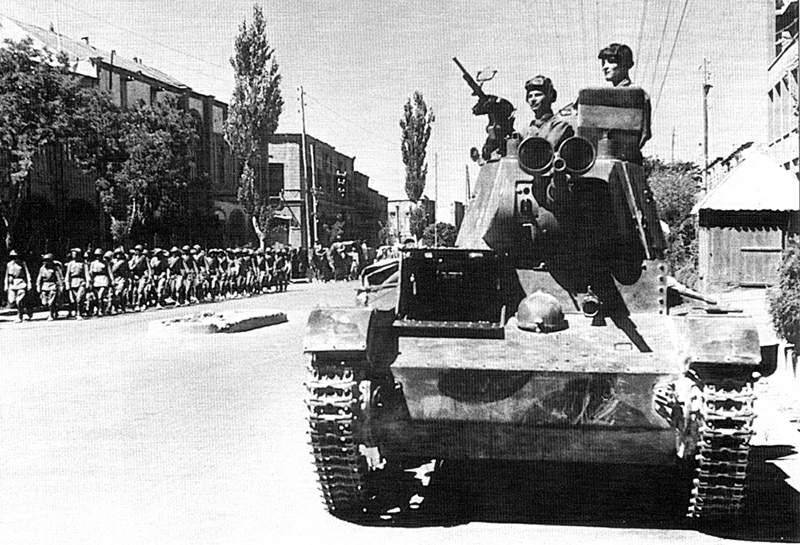
A Soviet T-26 light tank and its crew in Tabriz, Iran.

The Soviet Union policy during World War II was neutrality until August 1939, followed by friendly relations with Germany in order to carve up Eastern Europe. The USSR helped supply oil and munitions to Germany as its armies rolled across Western Europe in May–June 1940. Despite repeated warnings, Stalin refused to believe that Hitler was planning an all-out war on the USSR. Stalin was stunned and temporarily helpless when Hitler invaded in June 1941. Stalin quickly came to terms with Britain and the United States, cemented through a series of summit meetings. The U.S. and Britain supplied war materials in large quantity through Lend Lease. There was some coordination of military action, especially in summer 1944.

In 1944–1945, the Red Army completely or partially occupied Romania, Bulgaria, Hungary, Yugoslavia, Poland, Czechoslovakia, Austria, Denmark, Finland, and Norway.

As agreed with the Allies at the Tehran Conference in November 1943 and the Yalta Conference in February 1945, the Soviet Union entered World War II's Pacific Theater within three months of the end of the war in Europe. The invasion began on 9 August 1945, exactly three months after the German surrender on 8 May (9 May, 0:43 Moscow time). Although the commencement of the invasion fell between the American atomic bombing of Hiroshima, on 6 August, and only hours before the Nagasaki bombing on 9 August, the timing of the invasion had been planned well in advance and was determined by the timing of the agreements at Tehran and Yalta, the long-term buildup of Soviet forces in the Far East since Tehran, and the date of the German surrender some three months earlier; on 3 August, Marshal Vasilevsky reported to Premier Joseph Stalin that, if necessary, he could attack on the morning of 5 August. At 11pm Trans-Baikal (UTC+10) time on 8 August 1945, Soviet foreign minister Vyacheslav Molotov informed Japanese ambassador Naotake Satō that the Soviet Union had declared war on Japan, and that from 9 August the Soviet government would consider itself to be at war with Japan.

== Cold War ==
=== Korean War (1950–1953) ===
Though not officially belligerent during the Korean War (1950–1953), the Soviet Union played a significant, covert role in the conflict; it provided material and medical services, as well as Soviet pilots and aircraft, most notably MiG-15 fighter jets, to aid the North Korean-Chinese forces against the United Nations forces. The Soviets claimed 510 UN aircraft shot down in just the first year of the war and a total of 1,300 during the entire war while losing only 345 of their own.

=== Hungarian Revolution of 1956 ===
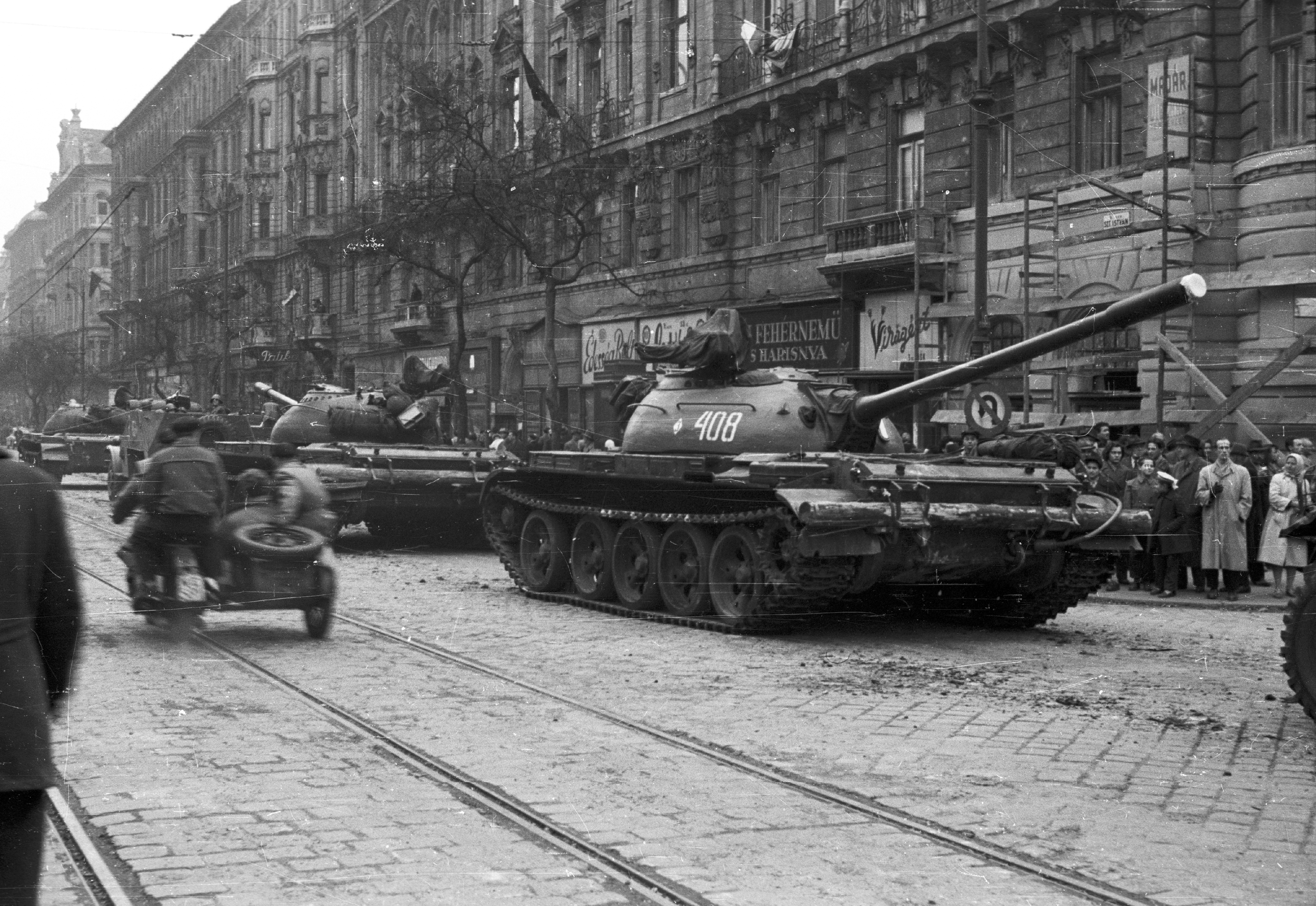
Soviet T-54 tanks in Budapest on 31 October

After Stalinist Hungarian dictator Mátyás Rákosi was replaced by Imre Nagy following Stalin's death and Polish reformist Władysław Gomułka was able to enact some reformist requests, large numbers of protesting Hungarians compiled a list of demands, including free secret-ballot elections, independent tribunals, and inquiries into Stalin and Rákosi Hungarian activities. Under the orders of Soviet defense minister Georgy Zhukov, Soviet tanks entered Budapest. Protester attacks at the Parliament forced the collapse of the Soviet-backed government.

The new government that came to power during the revolution formally disbanded the Hungarian secret police, declared its intention to withdraw from the Warsaw Pact and pledged to re-establish free elections. The Soviet Politburo thereafter moved to crush the revolution with a large Soviet force invading Budapest and other regions of the country. Approximately 200,000 Hungarians fled Hungary, some 26,000 Hungarians were put on trial by the new Soviet-installed János Kádár government and, of those, 13,000 were imprisoned. Imre Nagy was executed, along with Pál Maléter and Miklós Gimes, after secret trials in June 1958. By January 1957, the Hungarian government had suppressed all public opposition. These Hungarian government's violent oppressive actions alienated many Western Marxists, yet strengthened communist control in all the European communist states, cultivating the perception that communism was both irreversible and monolithic.

=== Invasion of Czechoslovakia (1968) ===
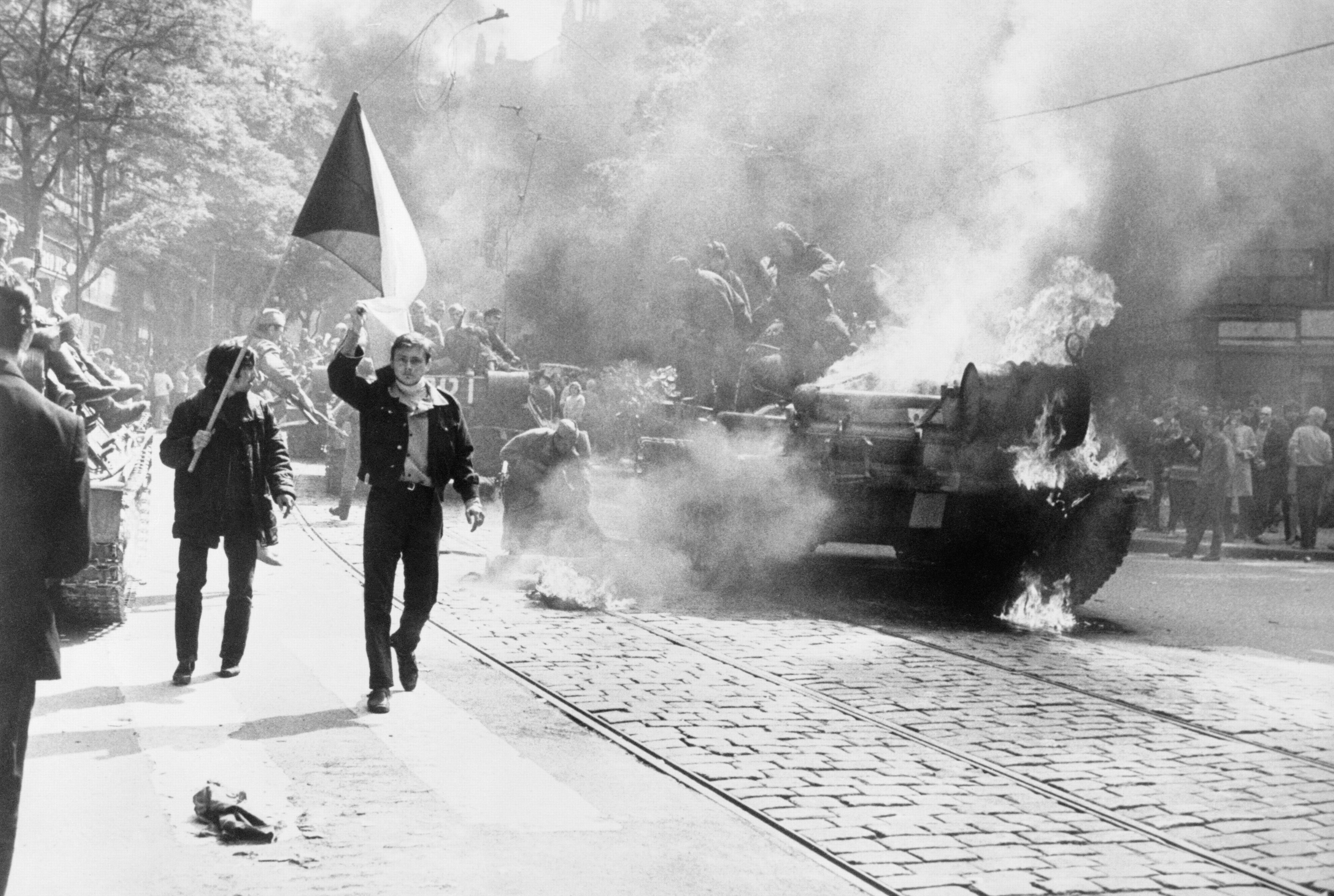
Czechoslovaks carry their national flag past a burning Soviet tank in Prague.

A period of political liberalization took place in 1968 in Eastern Bloc country Czechoslovakia called the Prague Spring. The event was spurred by several events, including economic reforms that addressed an early 1960s economic downturn. In April, Czechoslovak leader Alexander Dubček launched an "Action Program" of liberalizations, which included increasing freedom of the press, freedom of speech and freedom of movement, along with an economic emphasis on consumer goods, the possibility of a multiparty government and limiting the power of the secret police. Initial reaction within the Eastern Bloc was mixed, with Hungary's János Kádár expressing support, while Soviet leader Leonid Brezhnev and others grew concerned about Dubček's reforms, which they feared might weaken the Eastern Bloc's position during the Cold War. On 3 August, representatives from the Soviet Union, East Germany, Poland, Hungary, Bulgaria, and Czechoslovakia met in Bratislava and signed the Bratislava Declaration, which declaration affirmed unshakable fidelity to Marxism-Leninism and proletarian internationalism and declared an implacable struggle against "bourgeois" ideology and all "anti-socialist" forces.

On the night of 20–21 August 1968, Eastern Bloc armies from four Warsaw Pact countries – the Soviet Union, Bulgaria, Poland and Hungary – invaded Czechoslovakia. The invasion comported with the Brezhnev Doctrine, a policy of compelling Eastern Bloc states to subordinate national interests to those of the Bloc as a whole and the exercise of a Soviet right to intervene if an Eastern Bloc country appeared to shift towards capitalism. The invasion was followed by a wave of emigration, including an estimated 70,000 Czechs initially fleeing, with the total eventually reaching 300,000. In April 1969, Dubček was replaced as first secretary by Gustáv Husák, and a period of "normalization" began. Husák reversed Dubček's reforms, purged the party of liberal members, dismissed opponents from public office, reinstated the power of the police authorities, sought to re-centralize the economy and re-instated the disallowance of political commentary in mainstream media and by persons not considered to have "full political trust". The international image of the Soviet Union suffered considerably, especially among Western student movements inspired by the "New Left" and non-Aligned Movement states. Mao Zedong's People's Republic of China, for example, condemned both the Soviets and the Americans as imperialists.

=== Vietnam War (1964–1975) ===
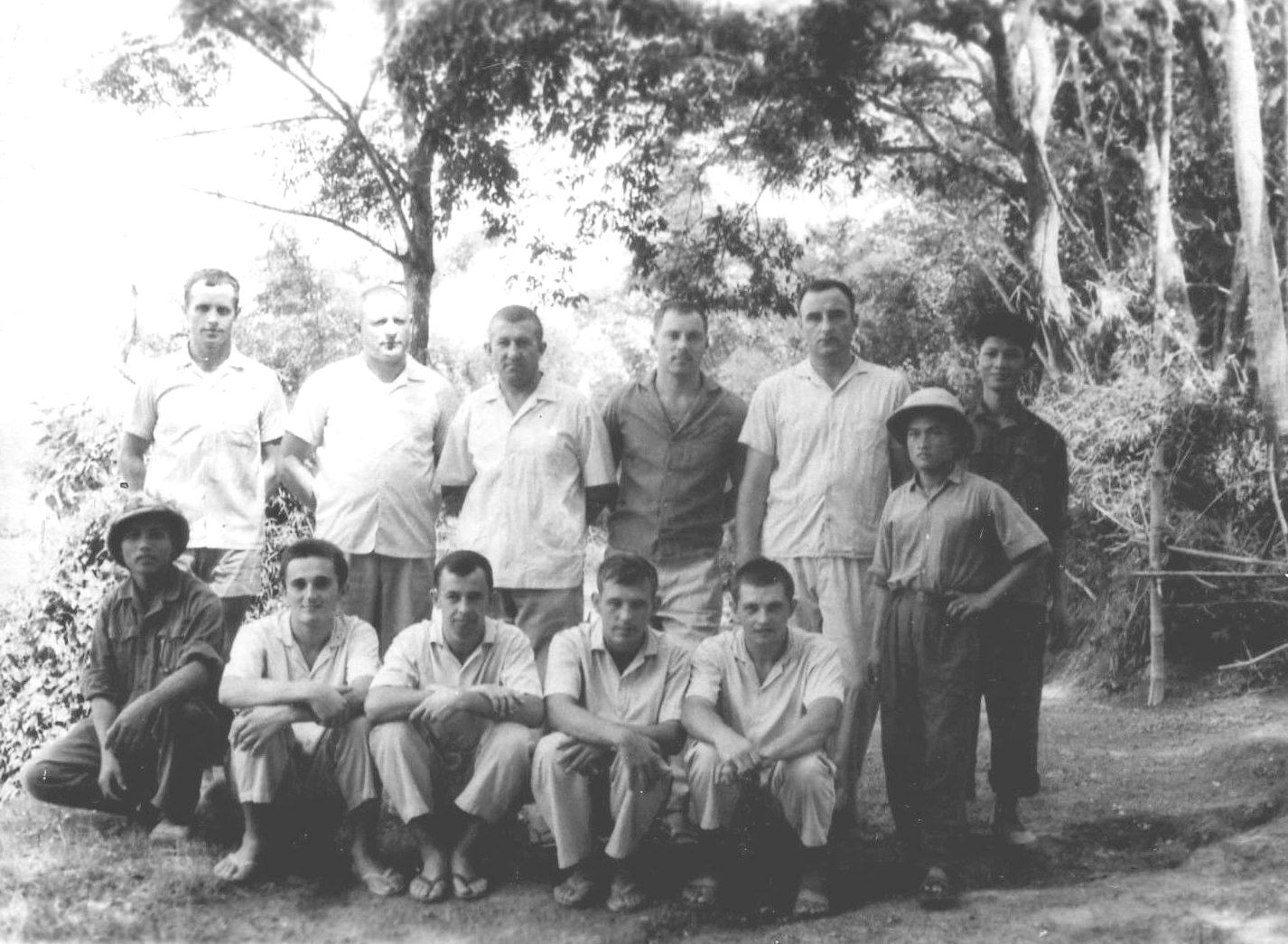
A regiment of Soviet military advisors of the 238th Air Defense Missile Regiment of the Vietnam People's Army.

Some 11,000 Soviet military experts, among them spetsnaz, were sent to Southeast Asia during the Vietnam War. Within South Vietnam, rumors persisted for years that men with blue eyes were reportedly spotted doing recon missions and testing their new SVD Dragunov sniper rifles. John Stryker Meyer was with Studies and Observation Group RT Idaho and had two encounters with what they believed were spetsnaz units operating in Laos in 1968.

Their mission was twofold. One, help a communist nation defeat an American ally and two, test and evaluate their most sophisticated radars and missiles directly against the best American aircraft had to offer. Soviets recovered at least 2 very important American intelligence gear, a cryptographic code machine and an F-111A escape capsule, which now sits in a Moscow Museum.

=== Other wars ===
Soviet military advisors played an important role in at least four wars:

- The Angolan Civil War (1975–1992), where the USSR supported the left-wing MPLA;
- The Mozambican Civil War (1977–1992), where Moscow also sided with the socialist government;
- The Ogaden War between Ethiopia and Somalia (1977–1978).
- War of Attrition between Arab countries and Israel.
- Congo Crisis, where USSR backed the Republic of the Congo against the State of Katanga.
- Operation Trikora: The Indonesian operation to seize Netherlands New Guinea was backed by Soviet troops manning submarines.
- North Yemen Civil War, Soviets supported Nasser's intervention in Yemen.
- Yemenite War of 1972, the Soviet Union opposed the Yemen Arab Republic and supported South Yemen.
- Yemenite War of 1979, the USSR supported South Yemen's invasion of the Yemen Arab Republic.

=== Invasion of Afghanistan (1979–1989) ===
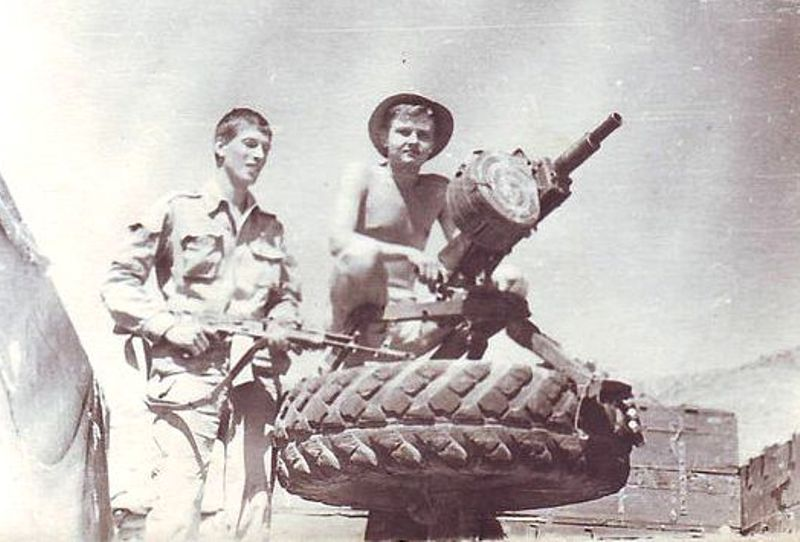
Soviet infantry at the time of deployment

During a 1978 coup d' état in Afghanistan, where the communist party took power, it started a series of radical modernization reforms throughout the country that were forced and deeply unpopular, particularly among the more traditional rural population and the established traditional power structures. The regime's nature of vigorously suppressing opposition, including executing thousands of political prisoners, led to the rise of anti-government armed groups, and by April 1979 large parts of the country were in open rebellion. The ruling party itself experienced deep rivalries, and in September 1979 the General Secretary of the People's Democratic Party of Afghanistan (PDPA), Nur Mohammad Taraki, was murdered under orders of the second-in-command, Hafizullah Amin, which soured relations with the Soviet Union. Eventually the Soviet government, under General Secretary Leonid Brezhnev, decided to deploy the 40th Army on 24 December 1979. Arriving in the capital of Kabul, they staged a coup, killing PDPA general secretary Amin and installing Soviet loyalist Babrak Karmal from a rival faction. The deployment had been variously called an "invasion" (by Western and Non-Aligned media and the rebels) or a legitimate supporting intervention (by the Soviet Union and the Afghan government) on the basis of the Brezhnev Doctrine.

In January 1980, foreign ministers from 34 nations of the Islamic Conference adopted a resolution demanding "the immediate, urgent and unconditional withdrawal of Soviet troops" from Afghanistan. The UN General Assembly passed a resolution protesting the Soviet intervention by a vote of 104 (for) to 18 (against), with 18 abstentions and 12 members of the 152-nation Assembly absent or not participating in the vote; only Soviet allies Angola, East Germany, and Vietnam, along with India, supported the intervention. Afghan insurgents began to receive massive amounts of aid and military training in neighboring Pakistan and China, paid for primarily by the United States and Arab monarchies in the Persian Gulf. As documented by the National Security Archive, "the Central Intelligence Agency (CIA) played a significant role in asserting U.S. influence in Afghanistan by funding military operations designed to frustrate the Soviet invasion of that country. CIA covert action worked through Pakistani intelligence services to reach Afghan rebel groups." Soviet troops occupied the cities and main arteries of communication, while the mujahideen waged guerrilla war in small groups operating in the almost 80 percent of the country that was outside government and Soviet control, almost exclusively being the rural countryside. The Soviets used their air power to deal harshly with both rebels and civilians, levelling villages to deny safe haven to the mujahideen, destroying vital irrigation ditches, and laying millions of land mines.

The international community imposed numerous sanctions and embargoes against the Soviet Union, and the U.S. led a boycott of the 1980 Summer Olympics held in Moscow. The boycott and sanctions exacerbated Cold War tensions and enraged the Soviet government, which later led a revenge boycott of the 1984 Summer Olympics held in Los Angeles. The Soviets initially planned to secure towns and roads, stabilize the government under new leader Karmal, and withdraw within six months or a year. But they were met with fierce resistance from the guerillas, and were stuck in a bloody war that lasted nine years. By the mid-1980s, the Soviet contingent was increased to 108,800 and fighting increased, but the military and diplomatic cost of the war to the USSR was high. By mid-1987 the Soviet Union, now under reformist leader Mikhail Gorbachev, announced it would start withdrawing its forces after meetings with the Afghan government. The final withdrawal started on 15 May 1988, and ended on 15 February 1989, leaving government forces alone in the battle against the insurgents, which continued until 1992 when the former Soviet-backed government collapsed. Due to its length, it has sometimes been referred to as the "Soviet Union's Vietnam War" or the "Bear Trap" by the Western media. The Soviets' failure in the war is thought to be a contributing factor to the fall of the Soviet Union.

As many as a 620,000 Soviet troops participated in the nine-year occupation, and 11,897 were killed and 51,367 were wounded. More than 1,000,000 Afghans—mostly civilians—were killed, and at least 4,000,000 were externally displaced by the fighting.

== See also ==
- Foreign interventions by China
- Foreign interventions by Cuba
- Foreign interventions by the United States
- History of the Soviet Union
- Proletarian internationalism
- List of conflicts related to the Cold War

== Sources ==
- Chubaryan, A. (2002). "Foreword". In Kulkov, E.; Rzheshevskii, O.; Shukman, H. (eds.). Stalin and the Soviet-Finnish War, 1939–1940. Frank Cass. ISBN 978-0-7146-5203-0.
- Clemmesen, Michael H.; Faulkner, Marcus, eds. (2013). Northern European Overture to War, 1939–1941: From Memel to Barbarossa. Brill. ISBN 978-90-04-24908-0.
- Clodfelter, M. (2017). Warfare and Armed Conflicts: A Statistical Encyclopedia of Casualty and Other Figures, 1492-2015 (4th ed.). Jefferson, North Carolina: McFarland. ISBN 978-0786474707.
- Goertz, Gary (1995), Contexts of International Politics, Cambridge University Press, ISBN 0-521-46972-4
- Grenville, John Ashley Soames (2005), A History of the World from the 20th to the 21st Century, Routledge, ISBN 0-415-28954-8
- Lightbody, Bradley (2004). The Second World War: Ambitions to Nemesis. Routledge. ISBN 0-415-22404-7.
- Manninen, Ohto (2008). Miten Suomi valloitetaan: Puna-armeijan operaatiosuunnitelmat 1939–1944 [How to Conquer Finland: Operational Plans of the Red Army 1939–1944] (in Finnish). Edita. ISBN 978-951-37-5278-1.
- Navrátil, Jaromír (2006), The Prague Spring 1968: A National Security Archive Document Reader (National Security Archive Cold War Readers), Central European University Press, ISBN 963-7326-67-7
- Ravasz, István (2003). Finnország függetlenségi harca 1917–1945, Magyar önkéntesek Finnországban [Finland's struggle for independence from 1917 to 1945, Hungarian volunteers in Finland] (PDF) (in Hungarian). Wysocki Légió Hagyományőrző Egyesületnek. Archived from the original (PDF) on 20 October 2017.
- Reiter, Dan (2009). How Wars End (Illustrated ed.). Princeton University Press. ISBN 978-0691140605.
- Rentola, Kimmo (2003). Holtsmark, Sven G.; Pharo, Helge Ø.; Tamnes, Rolf (eds.). Motstrøms: Olav Riste og norsk internasjonal historieskrivning [Counter Currents: Olav Riste and Norwegian international historiography.] (in Norwegian). Cappelen Akademisk Forlag. ISBN 8202218284.
- Trotter, William R. (2002) [1991]. The Winter War: The Russo–Finnish War of 1939–40 (5th ed.). Aurum Press. ISBN 1-85410-881-6.
- Williams, Kieran (1997), The Prague Spring and its Aftermath: Czechoslovak Politics, 1968–1970, Cambridge University Press, ISBN 0-521-58803-0
- Zeiler, Thomas W.; DuBois, Daniel M., eds. (2012). A Companion to World War II. Wiley Blackwell Companions to World History. Vol. 11. Wiley-Blackwell. ISBN 978-1-4051-9681-9.
