= Battle of Tutung =

1934 battle of the Soviet invasion of Xinjiang

- Part of the Soviet Invasion of Xinjiang
Date	1934
Location	Toutunhe, Xinjiang
Result	Inconclusive: Chinese withdrawal

Belligerents
(Taiwan) China	Soviet Union

Commanders and leaders
(Taiwan) Ma Zhongying	(Soviet Union) Gen. Volgin

Strength
	2 brigades of 7,000 men with tanks, bomber planes, artillery

Casualties and losses
Heavy	Heavy

The Battle of Tutung (Chinese: 頭屯河戰役) of 1934 occurred when Gen. Ma Zhongying's Chinese Muslim 36th Division was attacked by the Soviet Red Army on the banks of the frozen Tutung River. The battle took place over several days, and Soviet bombers used mustard gas. At one point, the Chinese Muslim troops dressed up in sheepskins for camouflage in the snow, and stormed Soviet machine-gun posts with curved swords at a short range and defeated a Soviet pincer attack. Casualties were getting heavy on both sides before Ma Zhongying ordered a retreat.
