= Battle of Ürümqi (1933–1934) =

Conflict in the winter of 1933–1934 at Ürümqi

Second Battle of Ürümqi
- Part of the Kumul Rebellion
Date	December 1933 – January 1934
Location	Ürümqi, Xinjiang
Result	Provincial victory

Belligerents
(Republic of China (1912–1949)) Republic of China: (Republic of China (1912–1949)) New 36th Division	Chinese Xinjiang Provincial government

Commanders and leaders
(Republic of China (1912–1949)) Ma Zhongying (Republic of China (1912–1949)) Zhang Peiyuan	Sheng Shicai (Russian Empire) Pavel Pappengut

Strength
10,000 Chinese Muslim troops and 3,000 Han Chinese troops	Thousands of Manchurian (North East Salvation Army) and White Russian troops

Casualties and losses
	Heavy

The Second Battle of Ürümqi (Chinese: 第二次迪化之戰) was a conflict in the winter of 1933–1934 at Ürümqi, between the provincial forces of Sheng Shicai and the alliance of the Chinese Muslim Gen. Ma Zhongying and Han Chinese Gen. Zhang Peiyuan. Zhang seized the road between Tacheng and the capital. Sheng Shicai commanded Manchurian troops and a unit of White Russian soldiers, led by Col. Pappengut. The Kuomintang Republic of China government had secretly incited Zhang and Ma to overthrow Sheng—even as they prepared to swear him in as governor of Xinjiang—because of his ties to the Soviet Union. Chinese Nationalist leader Gen. Chiang Kai-shek sent Luo Wen'gan to Xinjiang, where he met with Ma Zhongying and Zhang Peiyuan and urged them to destroy Sheng.

Ma and Zhang's Han Chinese and Chinese Muslim forces had almost defeated Sheng when he requested help from the Soviet Union. This led to the Soviet Invasion of Xinjiang and Ma Zhongying's retreat after the Battle of Tutung.

At this point, Chiang Kai-shek himself was personally prepared to enter the battle, with over 150,000 troops and 15 million yuan ready to assist Ma in driving out Sheng Shicai. However, he was told that it would be impossible to guarantee the troops adequate food, water, fuel, and other supplies, so Chiang cancelled the expedition. Sheng commented, "Chiang Kai-shek does not like my policies but he cannot do anything to me. I am too far away from his reach."
