= John Stryker Meyer =

American writer (born 1946)

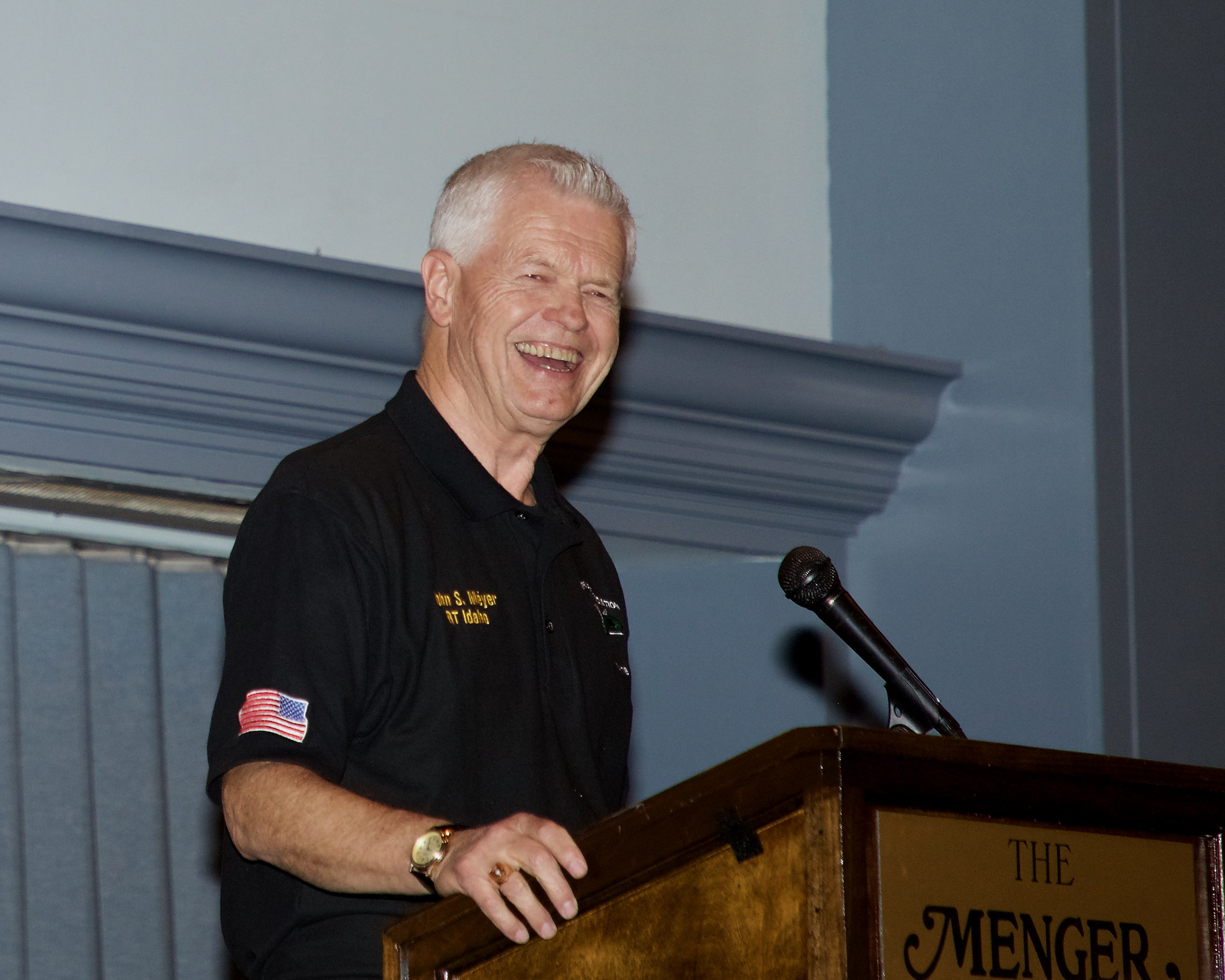
- Meyer in 2017 at the A-1 Skyraider Association reunion
- Born: 1946 (age 79–80); Trenton, New Jersey
- Military career
- Allegiance: United States
- Branch: United States Army Special Forces
- Service years: 1966–1970
- Rank: SSG
- Nickname: Tilt
- Units: 5th Special Forces Group, Studies and Observations Group
- Conflicts: Vietnam War
- Other work: Author

John Stryker "Tilt" Meyer (born 1946) is an American author and U.S. Army Special Forces combat veteran of service in covert reconnaissance with the Studies and Observations Group, also known as MACV-SOG. Meyer has published three works of nonfiction related to his experiences in the Vietnam War; the first was Across the Fence: The Secret War in Vietnam published in 2003.

== Early life and education ==
Meyer attended Trenton State College, but did not take higher education seriously and flunked out after two years. He then got a job at Yosemite National Park until he enlisted in the Army in May 1966.

== Military career ==
Meyer enlisted in the U.S. Army in 1967. He was accepted into the United States Army Airborne School and became airborne qualified. Meyer completed basic training at Ft. Dix, N.J., advanced infantry training at Ft. Gordon, Ga., jump school at Ft. Benning, Ga., and graduated from the Special Forces Qualification Course in Dec. 1967, earning his Green Beret.

As U.S. involvement in the Vietnam War escalated, the United States began deploying Special Forces "A-teams" (Operational Detachment Alpha, or ODA, teams) to Southeast Asia in support of counterinsurgency operations against the Viet Cong, North Vietnamese and other Communist forces.

A Green Beret, Meyer joined MACVSOG, signing a 20-year secrecy agreement, and served two tours of duty in 1968 and 1969 running missions in Vietnam and "across the fence" in Laos and Cambodia.

He arrived at FOB 1 Phu Bai in May 1968, where he joined Spike Team Idaho, which transferred to Command & Control North (CCN) in Da Nang January 1969. He began as the One-Two (Recon Team Radio Operator), and later became the One-Zero (Recon Team Leader, American) of ST Idaho until April 1969.

At the end of his first tour, Meyer returned to the U.S. and was assigned to E Company in the 10th Special Forces Group at Ft. Devens, Mass. until October 1969, when he rejoined RT Idaho at CCN for his second tour, which ended in April 1970.

== Career ==
Upon ending his two tours of duty in Vietnam, Meyer completed his college education at Trenton State College, where he was editor of The Signal school newspaper for two years. He worked at the Trenton Times for ten years, the San Diego Union Tribune for eight years, and The North County Times for 15 years before focusing his efforts entirely on the veterans community at two separate non-profits.

Meyer served as president of the Special Operations Association from 2011 to 2014. He also served as president of Special Forces Association Chapter 78 in 2018 and 2019, and as an associate director in the veterans department at Interfaith Community Services, a non-profit organization that focuses on supporting homeless veterans.

Meyer was a board member of VANC (Veterans Association of North San Diego County) and was co-chairman of One VA-CAB (Veterans Association Community Advocacy Board) in San Diego from 2016 to 2020. He also has memberships in the following: VFW, American Legion, United Veterans Council, and the San Diego Veterans Coalition.

In addition to his continued work as an author, speaker, and veterans advocate, Meyer also hosts SOGCast, a podcast featuring untold stories of MACVSOG and those of fellow Green Berets and Special Forces operators.

== Awards and decorations ==
- Combat Infantryman Badge
- Parachutist Badge
- Army Commendation Ribbon
- Army Air Medal
- National Defense Service Medal
- Vietnam Service Medal
- Vietnam Campaign Medal
- Presidential Unit Citation 2001, Studies and Observations Group
- Vietnam Gallantry Cross Unit Citation
- Army Special Forces Tab
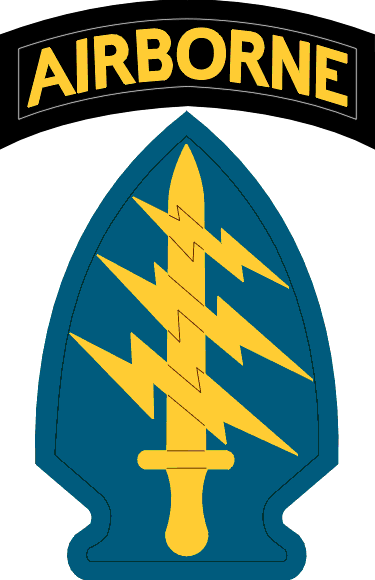
- Army Special Forces Command distinctive unit insignia
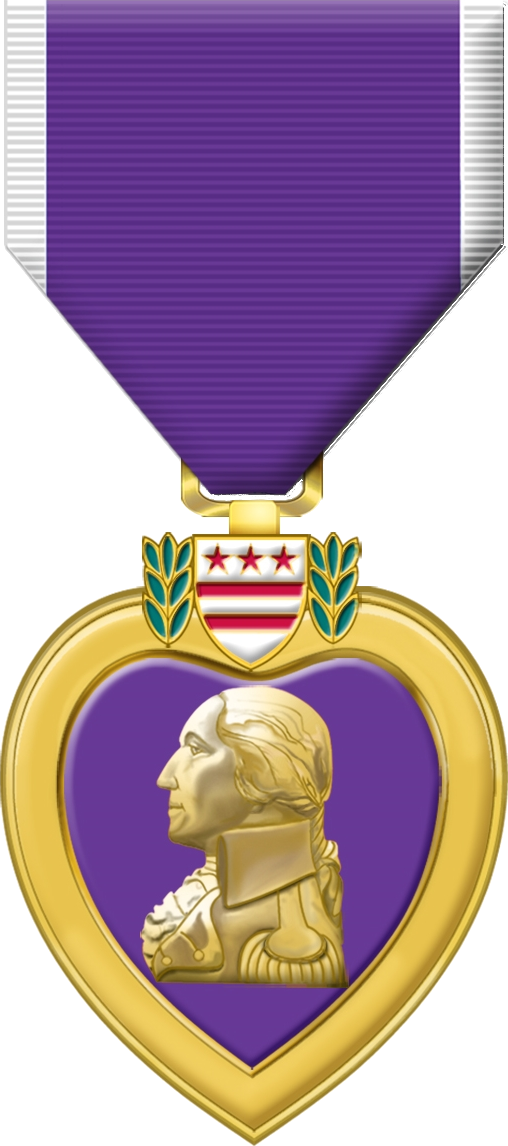
- Purple Heart
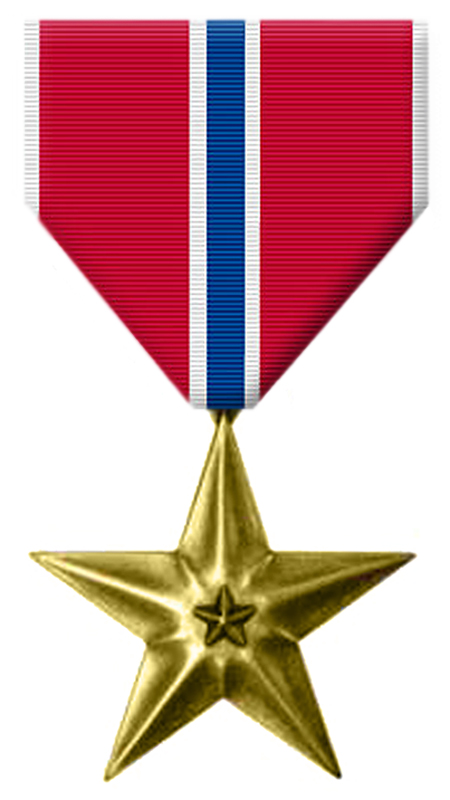
- Two Bronze Stars with "V" devices for valor

== Publications ==
=== Books ===
- Across the Fence: The Secret War in Vietnam (2003) ISBN 0983256764.
- On the Ground the Secret War in Vietnam, with John E. Peters (2007). ISBN 0977143171. OCLC 228179095.
- SOG Chronicles: Volume One ISBN 0983256780.

=== Articles ===
Meyer wrote articles for Robert K. Brown in Soldier of Fortune magazine under a nom de guerre. He also wrote articles for SOFREP.

== See also ==
- Studies and Observations Group
- Billy Waugh
- Robert L. Howard
