= Soviet invasion of Xinjiang =

1934 military intervention in support of warlord Sheng Shicai

- Part of the Kumul Rebellion
Date	January–April 1934
Location	Xinjiang
Result	Ceasefire
Territorial changes	De facto partition of Xinjiang between Soviet-backed and Kuomintang-aligned administrations

Belligerents
China	Soviet Union; Xinjiang clique; White Russian forces; Torgut Mongols

Commanders and leaders
(Republic of China (1912–1949)) Chiang Kai-shek; (Republic of China (1912–1949)) Ma Zhongying; (Republic of China (1912–1949)) Zhang Peiyuan †; (Republic of China (1912–1949)) Ma Hushan; (Republic of China (1912–1949)) Ma Shih-ming	(Soviet Union) Joseph Stalin; (Soviet Union) General Volgin; (Soviet Union) Ishaq Beg; Sheng Shicai; (Russian Empire) General Nikolay Bekteyev; (Russian Empire) Colonel Proshkukarov

Strength
New 36th Division: around 10,000 Chinese Muslim cavalry and foot soldiers; 3,000 Han Chinese soldiers of the Ili Garrison	7,000 Soviet GPU and Red Army troops in 2 brigades, airplanes, tanks; Several thousand White Russian soldiers; Several thousand Mongol Torguts

Casualties and losses
Heavy casualties, many civilians injured and killed	Heavy casualties, many injured; Dozens of armored cars destroyed

The Soviet invasion of Xinjiang (simplified Chinese: 苏联入侵新疆; traditional Chinese: 蘇聯入侵新疆) was a military campaign of the Soviet Union in the Chinese northwestern region of Xinjiang in 1934. White Russian forces assisted the Soviet Red Army.

== Background ==
In 1934, Ma Zhongying's troops, supported by the Kuomintang government of the Republic of China were on the verge of defeating the Soviet client Sheng Shicai during the Battle of Ürümqi (1933–34) in the Kumul Rebellion.

Ma Zhongying, a Hui (Chinese Muslim), had earlier attended the Whampoa Military Academy in Nanjing in 1929, when it was run by Chiang Kai-shek, who was also the head of the Kuomintang and leader of China (Nationalist government).

Ma Zhongying then was sent back to Gansu after graduating from the academy and fought in the Kumul Rebellion where, with the tacit support of the Kuomintang government of China, he tried to overthrow the pro-Soviet provincial government first led by Governor Jin Shuren then duban (military governor) Sheng Shicai. Ma invaded Xinjiang in support of Kumul Khanate loyalists and received official approval and designation from the Kuomintang as commander of the 36th Division.

In late 1933, the Han Chinese provincial commander General Zhang Peiyuan and his army defected from the provincial government side to Ma Zhongying's side and joined him in waging war against Jin Shuren's provincial government.

== Soviet invasion of Xinjiang ==
In 1934, two brigades of about 7,000 Soviet GPU troops, backed by tanks, airplanes and artillery with mustard gas, crossed the border to assist Sheng Shicai in gaining control of Xinjiang. The brigades were named "Altayiiskii" and "Tarbakhataiskii". Sheng's Han Chinese army was being severely beaten by an alliance of the army led by general Zhang Peiyuan, and the Chinese Muslim New 36th Division led by Ma Zhongying. Ma fought under the banner of the Kuomintang Republic of China government. The joint Soviet-White Russian force was called "The Altai Volunteers". Soviet soldiers disguised themselves in uniforms lacking markings, and were dispersed among the White Russians.

Despite his early successes, Zhang's forces were overrun at Kulja and Chuguchak, and he committed suicide after the battle at Muzart Pass to avoid capture.

Even though the Soviets were superior to the New 36th Division in both manpower and technology, they were held off for weeks and took severe casualties. The New 36th Division managed to halt the Soviet forces from supplying Sheng with military equipment. Chinese Muslim troops led by Ma Shih-ming managed to hold off the superior Red Army forces armed with machine guns, tanks, and planes for about 30 days.

When news that Chinese forces had defeated the Soviets reached Chinese prisoners in Ürümqi, they were reported to have jubilantly celebrated in their cells.

Ma Hushan, Deputy Divisional Commander of the New 36th division, became well known for victories over Russian forces during the invasion.

At this point, Chiang Kai-shek was ready to send Huang Shaohong and his expeditionary force which he assembled to assist Ma Zhongying against Sheng, but when Chiang heard about the Soviet invasion, he decided to withdraw to avoid an international incident if his troops directly engaged the Soviets.

"The Russ(ians) brought the feiji (airplanes) and bombed and gassed us", Ma Hsi Jung reported (Ma Hushan) on the war.

=== Battle of Tutung ===
In 1934, two Soviet OGPU brigades, consisting of about 7,000 troops backed by tanks, planes, and artillery, attacked the new 36th division near Tutung. The battle raged for several weeks along the frozen Tutung River. New 36th Division troops, camouflaged in sheepskins in the snow, stormed Soviet machine gun posts with swords to defeat a Soviet pincer attack. Soviet planes bombed the new 36th Division with mustard gas. Both sides suffered heavy casualties, before Ma Zhongying ordered the 36th Division to withdraw.

=== Battle of Dawan Cheng ===
Ma Zhongying was chased by a mixture of White Russian, Mongol, and collaborationist Chinese forces. As he pulled back his forces, Ma Zhongying encountered a Soviet armored car column of a few hundred soldiers near Dawan Cheng. The 36th Division wiped out nearly the entire column, after engaging the Soviets in fierce melee combat and toppled the wrecked Russian armored cars down the mountain. When a White Russian force showed up, Ma Zhongying withdrew.

During the Battle of Dawan Cheng, Ma Zhongying for the last time tried to retake initiative from invading Soviet troops. His men dug trenches in a narrow mountain pass and blocked the advance of Soviet troops for weeks. However, mustard gas air bombings of his positions, affecting about 20% of his troops, forced him to withdraw his forces at the end of February 1934 from Dawan Cheng to Turpan.

=== Conclusion of operations ===
During Ma Zhongying's retreat, he and 40 of his Chinese Muslim troops, fully armed, hijacked lorries at gunpoint from Sven Hedin, who was on an expedition from the Nanjing KMT government. When Hedin showed him his passports from Nanjing, Ma Zhongying's men, who were technically under Nanjing's command, responded by saying: "This has nothing to do with Nanking. There's a war on here, and no passports are valid in wartime."

The Chinese Muslim forces also reminded Hedin that since they were serving Nanjing too, the lorries should be put under their command. Chang, who was in the service of General Ma Chung-ping, one of Ma Zhongying's subordinate generals, explained: "Military matters come before everything else! Nothing can be allowed to interfere with them. Nanking counts for nothing in a war in Sinkiang. For that matter, we are under Nanking too, and it ought to be in both your interest and Nanking's to help us."

Hedin and his party were detained in Korla by Soviet and White Russian forces. Hedin personally met General Volgin. Torgut Mongols and White Russians served under the Soviet forces and joined them in occupying numerous cities.

The White Russians first advanced from Davan-ch'eng and then to Korla via Toqsun and Qara-Shahr. The Torgut and Russian army marched into Korla on March 16. Russian Cossacks were seen serving in the Soviet forces. Ma Zhongying had warned Sven Hedin to avoid Dawan Cheng due to the battle going on between Chinese Muslim and Russian forces.

General Volgin then met with Hedin and started verbally attacking Ma Zhongying by saying: "General Ma is hated and abused everywhere, and he has turned Sinkiang into a desert. But he is brave and energetic and sticks at nothing. He isn't afraid of anything, whether airplanes or superior numbers. But now a new era has begun for Sinkiang. Now there is to be order, peace, and security in this province. General Sheng Shih-ts'ai is going to organize the administration and put everything on its legs again."

General Ma Zhongying's retreating army often hijacked lorries to assist in their retreat. Volgin noted that Ma Zhongying often destroyed Russian lorries during battle. A White Russian informed Sven Hedin that "We have been coming here from Qara-Shahr all day, troop after troop. Two thousand Russians arrived to-day, half White, half Red. There are a thousand Torguts here, and two thousand troops of all arms have gone straight on to Kucha to attack Ma Chung-ying without touching Korla. Most of the two thousand who are in Korla now will continue westward to-morrow. We were five thousand strong when we started from Urumchi."

When the White Russian started to brag about what their army had done, Sven Hedin concluded that the Russian was lying, giving as one example of these lies the White Russians' exaggeration of the number of lorries they used.

The Mongol soldiers were reported to have ill-treated the people of Korla.

Hedin met another two White Russian officers serving under the Soviets, Colonel Proshkukarov and General Bekteev, who demanded an explanation as to why Hedin's lorries were in the service of Ma Zhongying's forces.

Before Ma Zhongying himself retreated from the front line, he sent an advance guard of 800 troops under General Ma Fu-yuan to defeat the Uyghur forces of Hoja-Niyaz, who were armed with weapons supplied by the USSR, and to assist Ma Zhancang in the Battle of Kashgar (1934) to destroy the First East Turkestan Republic. Thomson-Glover stated that the Soviets gave Hoya Niyaz "nearly 2,000 rifles with ammunition, a few hundred bombs, and three machine guns". Hoja Niyaz's Uighur forces were defeated by the advance guard at Aksu, and he fled to Kashgar with 1,500 troops on January 13, 1934. During the Battle of Kashgar, he and the Turkic forces failed in all of their attacks to defeat the Chinese Muslim forces trapped in the city, suffering severe casualties. Ma Fuyuan's 800 Chinese Muslim troops, along with 1,200 conscripts, routed and bulldozed the East Turkestani army of 10,000.

Ma Zhongying and his army retreated to Kashgar, arriving on April 6, 1934. GPU Soviet troops did not advance beyond Turfan. Ma was chased by provincial forces of White Russians, Mongols, and Sheng Shicai's Chinese troops from Manchuria, all the way to Aksu, but the pursuit gradually abated. Ma arrived in Sven Hedin's hijacked lorry, with the final part of his army, the rear guard, behind the advance guard. His forces were reported to be superior in hand-to-hand combat, but the Soviets continued to bomb his positions.

General Ma told the British consulate in Kashgar that he immediately required assistance against the Russians, pointing out that he owed allegiance to the Chinese government, and that he intended to save Xinjiang from the grip of the Russians. Ma Zhongying consolidated his position at Maral-Bashi and Fayzabad, establishing defensive lines against the Soviet/provincial attack. Ma Hushan directed the defense against the provincial forces. Bombing runs continued at Maral-Bashi in June, Ma Zhongying ordered his forces to shift from Kashgar to Khotan. On 4, 5 and 6 July the Tungan forces streamed out of Kashgar towards Khotan, apparently expecting Ma Zhongying to follow with the rear-guard, as he had done during the retreat from Korla to Kashgar. However, for unknown reasons, Ma Zhongying himself crossed the border into the Soviet Union and was never heard from again. What actually happened, in the words of the British Consul-General Thomson-Glover, was that: "Ma Zhongying left Kashgar for Irkeshtam early on 7th July with three or four of his officers ... and an escort of some 50 Tungans and one or more members of the USSR Consulate or Trade Agency (Ma Zhongying was accompanied by M.Konstantinov, the Secretary of the Soviet Consulate at Kashgar, as far as Ming Yol, the first stage on the road to Irkeshtam). Arrived near the border to Russia the escort were met by Russians and Russian-employed troops. The Tungan escort dispersed or handed over their arms to some of Khoja Niyaz' levies and Ma Zhongying disappeared into Russia." British Vice Consul-General in Kashgar in 1937 M. C. Jillet, who travelled to Tunganistan in 1937 and interviewed Ma Hushan, then the commander of 36th Division, reported that Ma Zhongying went to the Soviet Union "as a hostage to prevent the further punishment of his troops".

=== Captured Soviet equipment ===
The 36th Division was severely lacking in arms. Rifles and other equipment dated around 1930 were seized from the Soviets as booty to augment their own arms.

== Casualties ==
=== Soviet casualties ===
In Novosibirsk, a hospital for Soviet wounded for their invasion of Xinjiang was disguised as a "hospital for the injured from the Manchurian War"; it was "discovered" by the London Evening Standard reporter Bosworth Goldman.

Goldman's account of the hospital stated:

Men were sitting about in a gloomy hall, many of them with some part of their body hidden in bandages; they ranged in nationality from Laplanders to pure Mongols ... I asked some of them where they had been, and they replied that they had been fighting in the southern Altai, in co-operation with some Chinese, against 'anti-social elements' disturbing the advance of the class warfare banner into Sinkiang ... Later, other men with whom I spoke about this struggle often told me that they had never heard of a hospital at Novosibirsk. On the other hand, an occupant of the one I visited told me it was 'the best of the three'.

== See also ==
- Amur Military Flotilla
- Manchouli Incident
- Sino-Soviet conflict (1929)
- Islamic rebellion in Xinjiang (1937)
- Ili Rebellion
- Foreign interventions by the Soviet Union
