= Demands of Hungarian Revolutionaries of 1956 =

1956 document

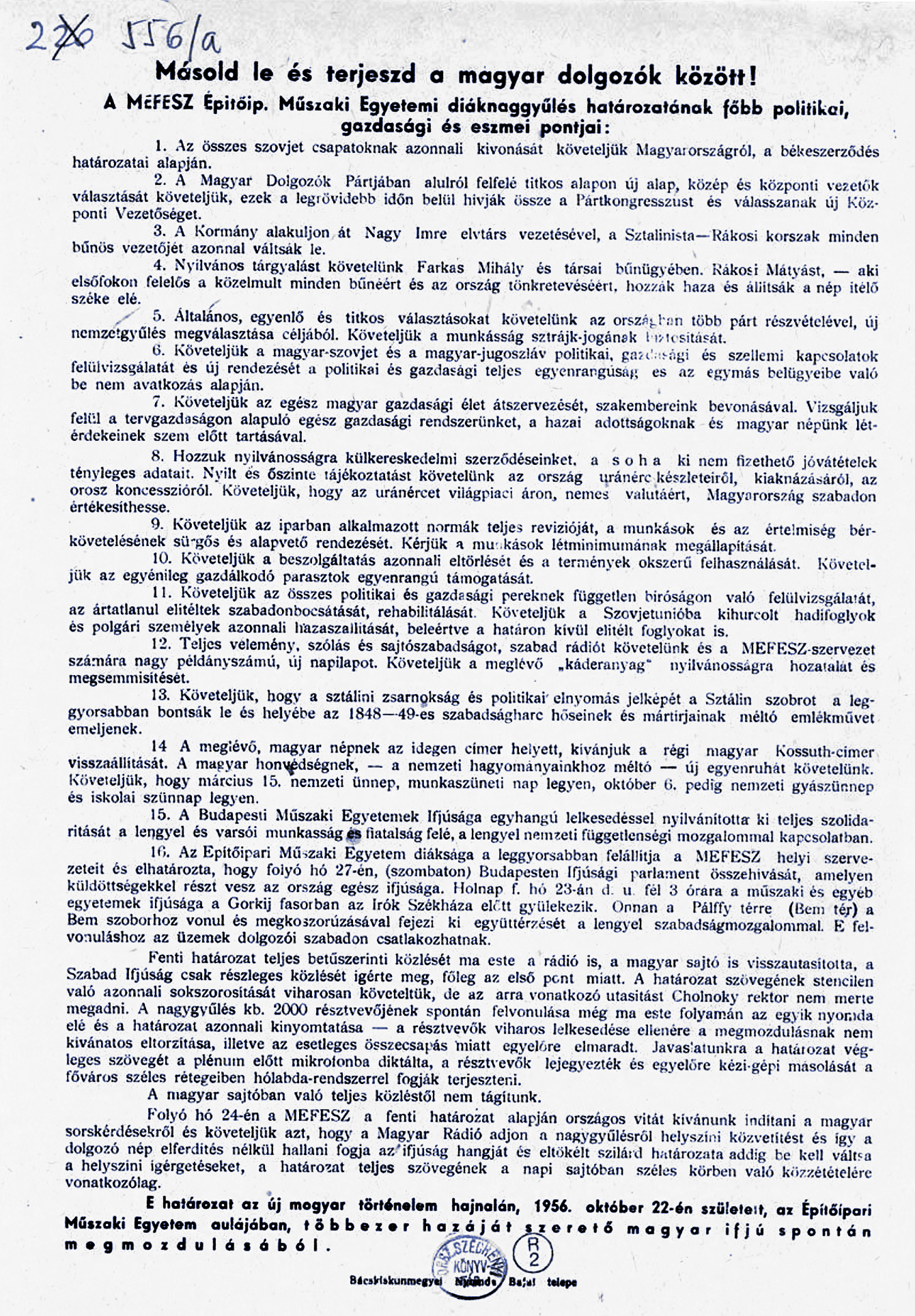
The demands

On October 22, 1956, a group of Hungarian students compiled a list of sixteen points containing key national policy demands. Following an anti-Soviet protest march through the Hungarian capital of Budapest, the students attempted to enter the city's main broadcasting station to read their demands on the air. The students were detained, and when people gathered outside the broadcasting station to call for their release, the state security police fired on the unarmed crowd, setting off the Hungarian Revolution of 1956.

1. We demand the immediate evacuation of all Soviet troops, in conformity with the provisions of the Peace Treaty.
2. We demand the election by secret ballot of all Party members from top to bottom, and of new officers for the lower, middle and upper echelons of the Hungarian Workers Party. These officers shall convene a Party Congress as early as possible in order to elect a Central Committee.
3. A new Government must be constituted under the direction of Imre Nagy: all criminal leaders of the Stalin–Rákosi era must be immediately dismissed.
4. We demand public enquiry into the criminal activities of Mihály Farkas and his accomplices. Mátyás Rákosi, who is the person most responsible for crimes of the recent past as well as for our country's ruin, must be returned to Hungary for trial before a people's tribunal.
5. We demand general elections by universal, secret ballot are held throughout the country to elect a new National Assembly, with all political parties participating. We demand that the right of workers to strike be recognised.
6. We demand revision and re-adjustment of Hungarian–Soviet and Hungarian–Yugoslav relations in the fields of politics, economics and cultural affairs, on a basis of complete political and economic equality, and of non-interference in the internal affairs of one by the other.
7. We demand the complete reorganisation of Hungary's economic life under the direction of specialists. The entire economic system, based on a system of planning, must be re-examined in the light of conditions in Hungary and in the vital interest of the Hungarian people.
8. Our foreign trade agreements and the exact total of reparations that can never be paid must be made public. We demand to be precisely informed of the uranium deposits in our country, on their exploitation and on the concessions to the Russians in this area. We demand that Hungary have the right to sell her uranium freely at world market prices to obtain hard currency.
9. We demand complete revision of the norms operating in industry and an immediate and radical adjustment of salaries in accordance with the just requirements of workers and intellectuals. We demand a minimum living wage for workers.
10. We demand that the system of distribution be organised on a new basis and that agricultural products be utilised in rational manner. We demand equality of treatment for individual farms.
11. We demand reviews by independent tribunals of all political and economic trials as well as the release and rehabilitation of the innocent. We demand the immediate repatriation of prisoners of war (World War II) and of civilian deportees to the Soviet Union, including prisoners sentenced outside Hungary.
12. We demand complete recognition of freedom of opinion and of expression, of freedom of the press and of radio, as well as the creation of a daily newspaper for the MEFESZ Organisation (Hungarian Federation of university and College Students’ Associations).
13. We demand that the statue of Stalin, symbol of Stalinist tyranny and political oppression, be removed as quickly as possible and be replaced by a monument in memory of the martyred freedom fighters of 1848–49.
14. We demand the replacement of emblems foreign to the Hungarian people by the old Hungarian arms of Kossuth. We demand new uniforms for the Army which conform to our national traditions. We demand that March 15 be declared a national holiday and that the October 6th be a day of national mourning on which schools will be closed.
15. The students of the Technological University of Budapest declare unanimously their solidarity with the workers and students of Warsaw and Poland in their movement towards national independence.
16. The students of the Technological University of Budapest will organise as rapidly as possible local branches of MEFESZ, and they have decided to convene at Budapest, on Saturday October 27, a Youth Parliament at which all the nation's youth shall be represented by their delegates.
