= Zhang Peiyuan =

Chinese general (1894–1934)

- Born: c. 1894
- Died: 1 June 1934 (age 39 or 40); Xinjiang, China
- Military career
- Allegiance: Republic of China
- Service years: 1929–1934
- Rank: general
- Unit: Ili garrison
- Commands: Governor of Ili
- Conflicts: Kumul Rebellion; First Battle of Urumqi (1933); Soviet Invasion of Xinjiang

Zhang Peiyuan (Chinese: 張培元; c. 1894 – 1 June 1934) was a Han Chinese general, commander of the Ili garrison. He fought against Uighur and Tungans during the Kumul revolt, but then secretly negotiated with the Tungan general Ma Zhongying to form an alliance against Sheng Shicai and the Soviet Union. Zhang's army had about 3,000 soldiers. They almost destroyed Sheng's armies but then the Soviet Union invaded Xinjiang and overran Zhang's forces. Zhang committed suicide to avoid capture by the Soviets at the Muzart Pass during a snow storm.
