= Islamic republic =

Republic based on Islamic law

The term "Islamic republic" has been used in various ways. Some Muslim religious leaders have used it as the name for a form of Islamic theocratic government enforcing sharia, or laws compatible with sharia. The term has also been used for a sovereign state taking a compromise position between a purely Islamic caliphate and a secular, nationalist republic.

The term is currently used in the official name of three states – Pakistan, Mauritania, and Iran. Pakistan first adopted the title under the constitution of 1956. Mauritania adopted it on 28 November 1958. Iran adopted it after the 1979 Iranian Revolution that overthrew the Pahlavi dynasty. Despite having similar names, the countries differ greatly in their governments and laws.

Iran is a religious theocratic state, while Pakistan and Mauritania are non-theocratic civil states. The Sharia is the official legal system in both Iran and Mauritania, but not in Pakistan where – despite Islam being the state religion – common law is the official legal system, although it does have Islamic principles ingrained in many aspects of its laws, e.g. inheritance, partially in banking, etc. Pakistan adopted the name in 1956 before Islam was yet to be declared the state religion; this happened at the adoption of the 1973 constitution.

Iran officially uses the full title in all governance names referring to the country (e.g. the Islamic Republic of Iran Army or the Islamic Republic of Iran Broadcasting); as opposed to its equivalents in Pakistan which are called the Pakistan Armed Forces and the Pakistan Broadcasting Corporation. Also, unlike the other countries, Iran uses the IRI acronym (Islamic Republic of Iran) as part of official acronyms.

== By country ==
Current Islamic Republics
| Name | Form of government | Legislature |
|---|---|---|
| Islamic Republic of Pakistan | Federal parliamentary Islamic republic | Parliament: Senate; National Assembly |
| Islamic Republic of Mauritania | Unitary semi-presidential Islamic republic | National Assembly |
| Islamic Republic of Iran | Unitary presidential theocratic Islamic republic | Islamic Consultative Assembly |

=== Pakistan ===
Pakistan was created as a homeland for the Muslims of British India, when British India was given independence, making Islam its raison d'être. It was the first country to adopt the adjective Islamic to modify its republican status under its otherwise secular constitution in 1956. Despite this definition, the country did not have a state religion until 1973, when a new constitution, more democratic and less secular, was adopted. Pakistan only uses the Islamic name on its passports, visas and coins. Although Islamic Republic is specifically mentioned in the constitution of 1973, all government documents are prepared under the name of the Government of Pakistan. The Constitution of Pakistan, Part IX, Article 227 states: "All existing laws shall be brought in conformity with the Injunctions of Islam as laid down in the Quran and Sunnah, in this Part referred to as the Injunctions of Islam, and no law shall be enacted which is repugnant to such Injunctions".

=== Mauritania ===
The Islamic Republic of Mauritania is a country in the Maghreb region of western North Africa. Mauritania was declared an independent state as the Islamic Republic of Mauritania, on November 28, 1960. Its legal system is "a mix of French civil law and Sharia Law", and its Penal Code punishes crimes against religion and “good morals” with "harsh sentences". "Heresy or apostasy (including in print) are "punishable by death".

=== Iran ===
The creation of the Islamic Republic of Iran was a dramatic historical event following the overthrow of the Pahlavi dynasty in 1979 by the Islamic revolution led by Ayatollah Ruhollah Khomeini. "Islamic" in the country's title was not a symbol of cultural identity, but indicated specific governmental system based on rule by Islamic jurists enforcing Islamic law. The system was based on The Jurist's Guardianship: Islamic Government, a work of revolution leader Ayatollah Ruhollah Khomeini, written before Khomeini came to power and known by Khomeini's followers but not by the general public. It argued that rather than elections and legislators, Islam required traditional Islamic law (sharia), and proper enforcement of sharia required a leading Islamic jurist (faqih) (such as Khomeini himself, who served as the first faqih "guardian" or Supreme Leader of Iran) to provide political "guardianship" (wilayat or velayat) over the people and nation (wilayat al-faqih). All the Muslim world should be united in such a state. With it, the entire non-Muslim world will evidentially "capitulate" to its courage and vigor; without it, Islam would fall victim to heresy, "obsolescence and decay".

The new government held a referendum for public approval to change Iran from a monarchy to an Islamic republic in March 1979, two months after the Islamic Revolution took power. While some political groups had suggested various names for the ideology of the Iranian revolution such as the Republic (without specifying Islam) or the Democratic Republic; Khomeini called for Iranians to vote for the name Islamic Republic, "not a word more and not a word less". When an Iranian journalist asked Khomeini what exactly Islamic Republic meant, Khomeini stated that the term republic has the same sense as other uses and Islamic republic has considered both Islamic ideology and the choice of people.

The day after the vote was complete, it was announced that 98.2% of the Iranian voters had voted to approve the new name.

Unlike Khomeini's original vision, the Islamic Republic is a "republic" with elections (Khomeini had originally described his "Islamic government" as "not ... based on the approval of laws in accordance with the opinion of the majority"); it has many of the trappings of a modern state—a president, cabinet and legislature (Khomeini mentioned none of these except for the legislature, which his government would not have because "no one has the right to legislate ... except ... the Divine Legislator"). Some, however, have argued that the legislature (and president, etc.) has been kept in a subordinate position in keeping with Khomeini's idea of government being a guardianship by jurists.

According to the constitution, the Islamic Republic of Iran is a system based on the following beliefs:

1. the One God (as stated in the phrase "There is no other god except God"), His exclusive sovereignty and right to legislate, and the necessity of submission to His commands;
2. divine revelation and its fundamental role in setting forth the laws;
3. the return to God in the Hereafter, and the constructive role of this belief in the course of man's ascent towards God;
4. the justice of God in creation and legislation;
5. continuous leadership and perpetual guidance, and its fundamental role in ensuring the uninterrupted process of the revolution of Islam;
6. the exalted dignity and value of man, and his freedom coupled with responsibility before God; in which equity, justice, political, economic, social and cultural independence, and national solidarity are secured by recourse to:

- continuous leadership of the holy persons, possessing necessary qualifications, exercised on the basis of the Quran and the Sunnah, upon all of whom be peace;
- sciences and arts and the most advanced results of human experience, together with the effort to advance them further;
- negation of all forms of oppression, both the infliction of and the submission to it, and of dominance, both its imposition and its acceptance.

== Former ==
| Full Name | Country | Dates | Government type |
|---|---|---|---|
| Chechen Republic of Ichkeria | Chechnya | 1996–2000 | Islamic republic |
| Federal Islamic Republic of the Comoros | Comoros | 1978–2001 | Federal and Islamic republic |
| (First East Turkestan Republic) Turkic Islamic Republic of East Turkestan | First East Turkestan Republic | 1933–1934 | Islamic republic |
| Republic of Afghanistan | Afghanistan | 1990–1992 | Unitary dominant-party Islamic republic |
| Islamic Republic of Sudan | Sudan | 1989–1998 | Unitary Islamic republic under a military dictatorship |
| Islamic State of Afghanistan | Afghanistan | 1992–1996; 2001–2002 | Unitary Islamic provisional government |
| Transitional Islamic State of Afghanistan | Afghanistan | 2002–2004 | Islamic republic (Transitional government) |
| Islamic Republic of Afghanistan | Afghanistan | 2004–2021 | Unitary presidential Islamic republic |
| Islamic Republic of The Gambia | The Gambia | 2015–2017 | Unitary presidential Islamic republic |

=== Chechen Republic of Ichkeria ===
The Chechen Republic of Ichkeria used an Islamic republic government system from 1996 to 2000.

=== Comoros ===
Between 1978 and 2001, the Comoros was the Federal and Islamic Republic of the Comoros.

=== East Turkestan ===
The Turkic Uyghur- and Kirghiz-controlled Turkish Islamic Republic of East Turkestan was declared in 1933 as an independent Islamic republic by Sabit Damulla Abdulbaki and Muhammad Amin Bughra. However, the Chinese Muslim 36th Division of the National Revolutionary Army defeated their armies and destroyed the republic during the Battles of Kashgar, Yangi Hissar and Yarkand. The Chinese Muslim Generals Ma Fuyuan and Ma Zhancang declared the destruction of the rebel forces and the return of the area to the control of the Republic of China in 1934, followed by the executions of the Turkic Muslim Emirs Abdullah Bughra and Nur Ahmad Jan Bughra. The Chinese Muslim General Ma Zhongying then entered the Id Kah Mosque in Kashgar and lectured the Turkic Muslims on being loyal to the Nationalist Government.

=== Sudan ===
After the 1989 Sudanese coup d'etat an Islamic regime was established in Sudan headed by the National Islamic Front, the NIF was interested in spreading Islam from above rather than preaching to the masses. It strove to eliminate the power of the traditional Sufi brotherhood based parties (the Democratic Unionist Party and the Umma Party) and replace them with itself. Under the NIF government, education was overhauled to focus on the glory of Arab and Islamic culture, and memorizing the Quran. Religious police in the capital insured that women were veiled, especially in government offices and universities.

Human rights abuses by the NIF regime included war crimes, ethnic cleansing, a revival of slavery, torture of opponents, and an unprecedented number of refugees fleeing into Uganda, Kenya, Eritrea, Egypt, Europe and North America. Repression of the "secular middle class" was "savage" and unprecedented for Sudan where "political customs" were relatively relaxed. "Purges and executions were carried out in the upper ranks" of the army, and civil and military officials were subjected to Islamist "reeducation". Opponents were forced into exile to prevent them from organizing an alternative to the regime. After tensions grew between Omar al-Bashir and Hassan al-Turabi, Turabi was kicked out of government and in 1999 the NIF was abolished.

=== Afghanistan ===
The Republic of Afghanistan was succeeded by the Islamic State of Afghanistan after the 1992 Peshawar Accords. The Islamic State lost the 1992-1996 civil war and was replaced by totalitarian Taliban-led Islamic Emirate. The Islamic Emirate was defeated during the 2001 United States' invasion and replaced by the Islamic Republic.

The Islamic Republic's 2004 constitution was very similar to the 1964 constitution of the Kingdom of Afghanistan, an Islamic monarchy. The "Islamic" prefix was symbolic and chosen because it was supported pro-Mujahideen delegates during the 2003 constitution convention.

The Islamic Republic lost the 2001–2021 war to the Taliban, which reestablished the Islamic Emirate.

=== The Gambia ===
In December 2015, the then-president Yahya Jammeh declared The Gambia to be an Islamic republic. Jammeh said that the move was designed to distance the West African state from its colonial past, that no dress code would be imposed and that citizens of other faiths would be allowed to practice freely. However, he later ordered all female government employees to wear headscarves before rescinding the decision shortly after. The announcement of an Islamic republic has been criticized as unconstitutional by at least one opposition group. After the removal of Jammeh in 2017, his successor Adama Barrow said the Gambia would no longer be an Islamic republic.

== See also ==
- Application of sharia by country
- Christian republic
- Halachic state
- Islamism
- Political aspects of Islam
- Islam and democracy
