= Battle of Sekes Tash =

- Part of the Kumul Rebellion
Date	1933
Location	Sekes Tash, Xinjiang
Result	Republic of China victory

Belligerents
(Republic of China (1912–1949)) Republic of China: (Republic of China (1912–1949)) New 36th Division	First East Turkestan Republic

Commanders and leaders
(Republic of China (1912–1949)) Ma Zhancang	(First East Turkestan Republic) Nur Ahmad Jan Bughra (First East Turkestan Republic) Abdullah Bughra (First East Turkestan Republic) Osman Ali (Kirghiz)

Strength
Several hundred Chinese muslim troops	Several hundred Turkic muslim Uighur and Kirghiz fighters

Casualties and losses
Unknown	Unknown

The Battle of Sekes Tash (Chinese: 賽克孜塔什戰役) of 1933 was a minor battle in which New 36th Division troops under General Ma Zhancang attacked and defeated Uighur and Kirghiz armies at Sekes Tesh.
