= Battle of Yarkand =

1934 battle of the Kumul Rebellion

- Part of the Kumul Rebellion
Date	April 1934 (before the Battle of Yangi Hissar)
Location	Yarkand, Xinjiang
Result	Chinese victory

Belligerents
(Republic of China (1912–1949)) Republic of China	(First East Turkestan Republic) First East Turkestan Republic; Supported by: Kingdom of Afghanistan

Commanders and leaders
(Republic of China (1912–1949)) Ma Zhancang (Republic of China (1912–1949)) Ma Fuyuan	(First East Turkestan Republic) Abdullah Bughra † (First East Turkestan Republic) Nur Ahmadjan Bughra (Kingdom of Afghanistan) Mohammad Zahir Shah

Units involved
(Republic of China (1912–1949)) New 36th Division	Unknown

Strength
Several hundred Chinese Muslim troops	Several hundred Turkic Muslim Uighur, Kirghiz and Afghan volunteers

Casualties and losses
Unknown	Almost all force annihilated
- At least 1000 people died, but there is no information on how many on each side.

The Battle of Yarkand (Chinese: 葉爾羌戰役) consisted of a well-armed force of Hui Muslims, where they entered the new city and aided its defenders against the Khotan Uyghurs and Afghan volunteers sent by King Mohammad Zahir Shah.

== Battle ==
With a decisive Chinese Victory in Yarkand with several thousand troops, that the New 36th Division were able to achieve any military success. Caught in the open, the troops of Abdullah Bughra Khotanlik were not able to combat the Hui Soldiers of the New 36th Division, and many were killed. Abdullah Bughra himself was cut down by Ma Zhancang, and it is noted that he was defended to the death by a bodyguard of Afghans. After Bughra’s defeat, his head was sent to Kashgar to be exhibited outside the Eidgah Mosque. Abdullah Bughra’s brother, Emir Nur Ahmad Jan Bughra, fled to Yingjisha County along with Uyghur and Kyrgyz rebel forces.

At least 1000 people died, but there is no information on how many on each side.
