= Su Chin-shou =

- Born: Gansu
- Military career
- Allegiance: Republic of China
- Service years: 1929–1937
- Rank: General
- Unit: 36th Division (National Revolutionary Army)
- Commands: General in the 36th Division (National Revolutionary Army)
- Conflicts: Kumul Rebellion

Su Chin-shou was a Chinese Muslim general of the 36th Division (National Revolutionary Army), who served under Generals Ma Zhongying and Ma Hushan. He was the Chief of Staff of General Ma Zhancang and was appointed as one of the two tao-yins of Kashgar in May, 1933. He vacated the old city Yamen to join Ma Zhancang in the New City since his fellow Chinese Muslims were massacred at the Kizil massacre.
