= Khoja Niyas Hajji Rebellion =

1933 Battle of the Kumul Rebellion

Battle of Toksun
- Part of Kumul Rebellion
| Date | 1933 |
| Location | Toksun, Xinjiang |
| Result | Republic of China victory |

Belligerents
| (Republic of China (1912–1949)) Republic of China: (Republic of China (1912–1949)) New 36th Division | Uighur Army |

Commanders and leaders
| (Republic of China (1912–1949)) Ma Zhongying (Republic of China (1912–1949)) Ma Shih-ming | Khoja Niyas Hajji |

Strength
| 36th Division unknown number of Chinese Muslim cavalry and foot soldiers | ~15,000 Uighur Combatents |

Casualties and losses
| Unknown | Heavy casualties |

The Battle of Toksun or Khoja Niyas Hajji Rebellion (Chinese: 托克遜戰役) occurred in July 1933 when Khoja Niyas Hajji, an ex-leader of New 36th Division, defected with his forces to the newly enthroned government of Sheng Shicai. Khoja Niyas Hajji rebelled and marched with his troops across Dawan Ch'eng and occupied Toksun, where the New 36th Division forces of General Ma Shih-ming achieved victory over Niyas Hajji's forces.
