= Pai Tzu-li =

- Born: Gansu
- Died: 1937; Xinjiang
- Military career
- Allegiance: Republic of China
- Service years: 1929–1937
- Rank: General
- Unit: 36th Division (National Revolutionary Army)
- Commands: General in the 36th Division (National Revolutionary Army)
- Conflicts: Kumul Rebellion, Xinjiang War (1937)

Pai Tzu-li (pinyin: Bai Zili) was a Chinese Muslim general of the 36th Division (National Revolutionary Army), who served under Generals Ma Zhongying and Ma Hushan. He was the secretary to Ma Zhongying and his age was estimated to be about 40. He was then chief of staff to General Ma Hushan and persuaded him to attack Kashgar in 1937.

On September 1, 1937, Pai withdrew to Karghalik at the head of the Tungan 1st brigade. On the 7th of September, Pai, along with Ma Ju-lung and Ma Hushan deserted their men and fled across the mountains to India.

Pai was said to have been shot on the road by Ma Hushan, and did not reach India.
