= Yengisar County =

County of Kashgar Prefecture in Xinjiang, China

Yengisar County: يېڭىسار ناھىيىسى (Uyghur); 英吉沙县 (Chinese); Yangi Hissar, Yingjisha
- County
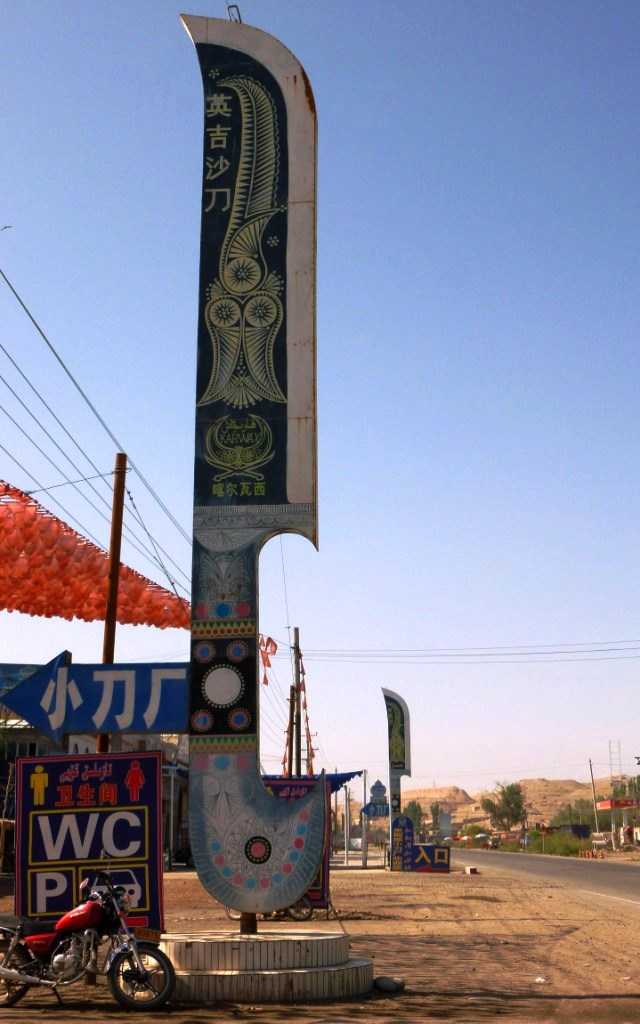
- Signs advertising Yengisar's famous knives

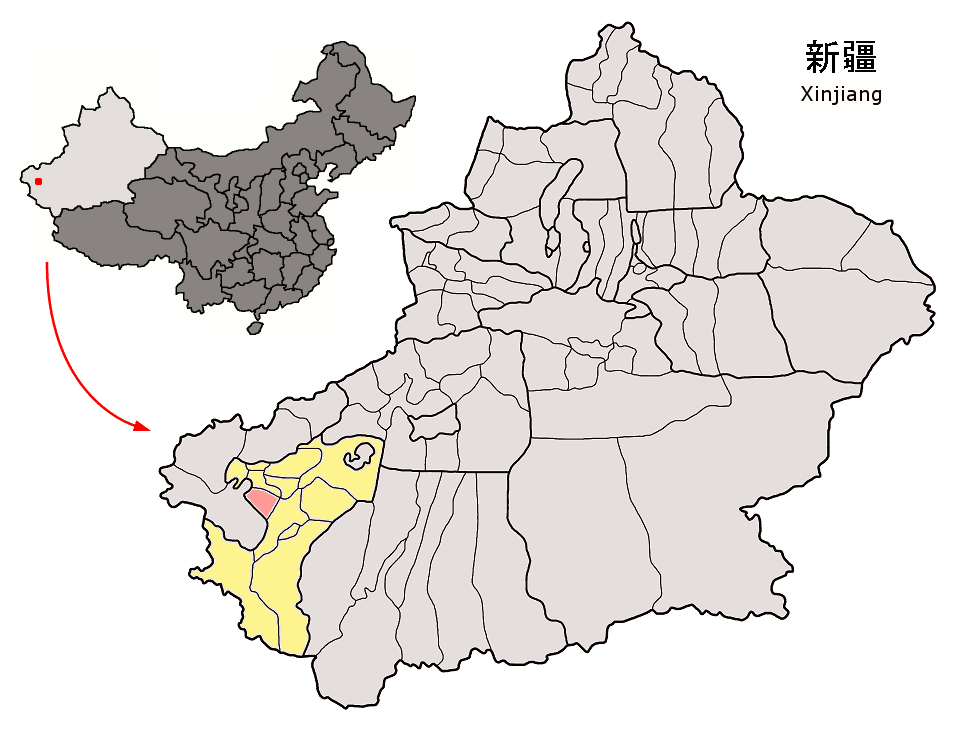
- Location of Yengisar County (red) within Kashgar Prefecture (yellow) in Xinjiang

- Location of the seat in Xinjiang Yengisar (Xinjiang) Yengisar (China)
- Coordinates: 38°55′33″N 76°10′17″E
- Country: China
- Autonomous region: Xinjiang
- Prefecture: Kashgar
- County seat: Yengisar

Area
  - Total: 3,425 km^{2} (1,322 sq mi)

Population (2020)
  - Total: 276,641
  - Density: 80.77/km^{2} (209.2/sq mi)

Ethnic groups
  - Major ethnic groups: Uyghur
- Time zone: UTC+8 (China Standard (Note: Locals in Xinjiang frequently observe UTC+6 (Xinjiang Time), 2 hours behind Beijing.))
- Postal code: 844500
- Website: www.yjs.gov.cn (in Chinese)

Yengisar County

Uyghur name
- Uyghur: يېڭىسار ناھىيىسى
- Literal meaning: new town county
Transcriptions
- Latin Yëziqi: Yéngisar nahiyisi
- Yengi Yeziⱪ: Yengisar naⱨiyisi
- Siril Yëziqi: Йеңисар наһийиси

Chinese name
- Simplified Chinese: 英吉沙县
- Traditional Chinese: 英吉沙縣
Transcriptions
Standard Mandarin
- Hanyu Pinyin: Yīngjíshā Xiàn
- Wade–Giles: Ying¹-chi²-sha¹ Hsien⁴

Alternative Chinese name
- Simplified Chinese: 新城县
- Traditional Chinese: 新城縣
Transcriptions
Standard Mandarin
- Hanyu Pinyin: Xīnchéng Xiàn

Yengisar County (formerly transliterated as Yangi Hissar, from Uyghur: يېڭىسار ناھىيىسى), also known as Yingjisha County (Chinese: 英吉沙县), is a county of Kashgar Prefecture in southwest Xinjiang, China. It covers an area of 3,373 km^{2} (1,302 sq mi). As of the 2002 census, it had a population of 230,000.

The county seat is the city of Yengisar, a town well known among the local Uyghurs for its handmade knives. The finely-tuned skill of knife-making used to be passed down among generations in Yengisar, but it is slowly dying due to China's strict response to deadly clashes in Xinjiang.

== Etymology ==
The name Yengisar is a contraction of the older Yangi Hissar, meaning "New Fortress" in Uyghur (cf. Yenihisar in Turkey).

== History ==
In 1499, Ahmad Alaq seized Kashgar and Yengisar from Mirza Abu Bakr Dughlat.

In 1847 and again in 1857, Kashgar and Yengisar were captured.

In 1882, Yengisar Independent Subprefecture (英吉沙直隸廳) was created.

In 1913, Yengisar Independent Subprefecture became Yengisar County.

The Battle of Yangi Hissar took place here in April 1934, when Ma Zhancang led the Chinese Muslim 36th division to attack the Turkic Muslim Uighur forces at Yangi Hissar, wiping out the entire Uighur force of 500 and killing the Emir Nur Ahmad Jan Bughra.

In 1955, Barin, Jamaterek and Ujme were transferred from Yengisar County to Akto County.

In September 2017, Horigul Nasir, then 21, was jailed for ten years for allegedly promoting the wearing of head scarves. Her brother Yusupjan Nasir was subsequently demoted from his position as an assistant officer of the Saghan township police office to a security guard at the township's Family Planning Department.

== Administrative Divisions ==
Yengisar County included 4 towns, 10 townships, and two other areas:

Name	Simplified Chinese	Hanyu Pinyin	Uyghur (UEY)	Uyghur Latin (ULY)	Administrative division code	Notes
Towns
Yengisar Town	英吉沙镇	Yīngjíshā Zhèn	يېڭىسار بازىرى	yëngisar baziri	653123100	
Ulugqat Town	乌恰镇	Wūqià Zhèn	ئۇلۇغچات بازىرى	Ulughchat baziri	653123101	Formerly Ulugqat Township (乌恰乡)
Mangshin Town (Mangxin Town)	芒辛镇	Mángxīn Zhèn	ماڭشىن بازىرى	mangshin baziri	653123102	Formerly Mangshin Township (ماڭشىن يېزىسى / 芒辛乡)
Saghan Town	萨罕镇	Sàhǎn Zhèn	ساغان بازىرى	saghan baziri	653123102	Formerly Mangshin Township (ساغان يېزىسى / 萨罕乡)
Townships
Sheher Township (Chengguan Township)	城关乡	Chéngguǎn Xiāng	شەھەر يېزىسى	sheher yëzisi	653123200	
Qolpan Township	乔勒潘乡	Qiáolèpān Xiāng	چولپان يېزىسى	cholpan yëzisi	653123201	
Lompa Township	龙甫乡	Lóngfǔ Xiāng	لومپا يېزىسى	lompa yëzisi	653123202	
Siyitle Township	色提力乡	Sètílì Xiāng	سىيىتلە يېزىسى	siyitle yëzisi	653123204	
Yengiyer Township	英也尔乡	Yīngyě'ěr Xiāng	يېڭىيەر يېزىسى	yëngiyer yëzisi	653123206	
Qizil Township	克孜勒乡	Kèzīlè Xiāng	قىزىل يېزىسى	qizil yëzisi	653123207	
Topluq Township	托普鲁克乡	Tuōpǔlǔkè Xiāng	توپلۇق يېزىسى	topluq yëzisi	653123208	
Soget Township	苏盖提乡	Sūgàití Xiāng	سۆگەت يېزىسى	söget yëzisi	653123209	
Egus Township	艾古斯乡	Àigǔsī Xiāng	ئەگۈس يېزىسى	Egüs yëzisi	653123211	
Egizyer Township	依格孜也尔乡 (依格孜牙乡)	Yīgézīyě'ěr Xiāng	ئېگىزيەر يېزىسى	Ëgizyer yëzisi	653123212	

== Climate ==
Climate data for Yengisar, elevation 1,298 m (4,259 ft), (1991–2020 normals, extremes 1981–present)
Month	Jan	Feb	Mar	Apr	May	Jun	Jul	Aug	Sep	Oct	Nov	Dec	Year
Record high °C (°F)	20.4 (68.7)	25.3 (77.5)	29.4 (84.9)	34.8 (94.6)	35.8 (96.4)	39.5 (103.1)	40.7 (105.3)	42.1 (107.8)	35.7 (96.3)	30.5 (86.9)	26.1 (79.0)	19.4 (66.9)	42.1 (107.8)
Mean daily maximum °C (°F)	0.1 (32.2)	6.2 (43.2)	15.6 (60.1)	23.6 (74.5)	28.0 (82.4)	32.0 (89.6)	33.6 (92.5)	32.1 (89.8)	27.5 (81.5)	20.6 (69.1)	11.4 (52.5)	2.1 (35.8)	19.4 (66.9)
Daily mean °C (°F)	−5.4 (22.3)	0.3 (32.5)	9.2 (48.6)	16.6 (61.9)	20.8 (69.4)	24.6 (76.3)	26.4 (79.5)	24.9 (76.8)	20.4 (68.7)	13.0 (55.4)	4.5 (40.1)	−3.1 (26.4)	12.7 (54.8)
Mean daily minimum °C (°F)	−9.8 (14.4)	−4.7 (23.5)	3.5 (38.3)	10.2 (50.4)	14.3 (57.7)	18.0 (64.4)	20.0 (68.0)	18.8 (65.8)	14.2 (57.6)	6.7 (44.1)	−0.8 (30.6)	−7.0 (19.4)	7.0 (44.5)
Record low °C (°F)	−22.2 (−8.0)	−22.6 (−8.7)	−10.1 (13.8)	−1.4 (29.5)	4.4 (39.9)	8.8 (47.8)	10.9 (51.6)	9.5 (49.1)	3.4 (38.1)	−4.4 (24.1)	−12.0 (10.4)	−20.1 (−4.2)	−22.6 (−8.7)
Average precipitation mm (inches)	3.2 (0.13)	6.1 (0.24)	7.1 (0.28)	4.9 (0.19)	12.1 (0.48)	10.4 (0.41)	10.1 (0.40)	11.9 (0.47)	12.1 (0.48)	4.7 (0.19)	2.7 (0.11)	2.2 (0.09)	87.5 (3.47)
Average precipitation days (≥ 0.1 mm)	2.7	2.6	2.1	1.8	3.8	4.9	4.8	4.6	3.6	1.3	0.7	2.0	34.9
Average snowy days	6.6	3.9	1.0	0.1	0	0	0	0	0	0	0.8	5.6	18
Average relative humidity (%)	66	57	44	36	38	38	41	46	50	53	58	68	50
Mean monthly sunshine hours	137.6	147.6	179.5	211.2	257.6	293.6	295.9	270.5	248.5	236.7	184.7	131.9	2,595.3
Percentage possible sunshine	45	48	48	53	58	66	66	65	68	70	62	45	58
Source: China Meteorological Administrationall-time February high

== Economy ==
As of 1885, there was about 72,700 acres (480,014 mu) of cultivated land in Yengisar.

== Demographics ==
Historical population
Year	Pop.	±% p.a.
2000	213,338	—
2010	262,067	+2.08%

As of 2015, 297,290 of the 302,542 residents of the county were Uyghur, 25,404 were Han Chinese and 851 were from other ethnic groups.

As of 1999, 97.82% of the population of Yengisar (Yingjisha) County was Uyghur and 1.79% of the population was Han Chinese.

== Transportation ==
Yengisar is served by China National Highway 315 and the Southern Xinjiang railway.

== Wildlife ==
The city of Yengisar gave its name to Yangihissar gecko (Cyrtopodion elongatum) lizard species, which occurs throughout eastern Central Asia, including Xinjiang and Gansu Province.

== Notable persons ==
- Isa Alptekin, Uyghur nationalist
- Erkin Alptekin, 1st President of the World Uyghur Congress
- Arken Imirbaki
- Yulbars Khan

== Gallery ==
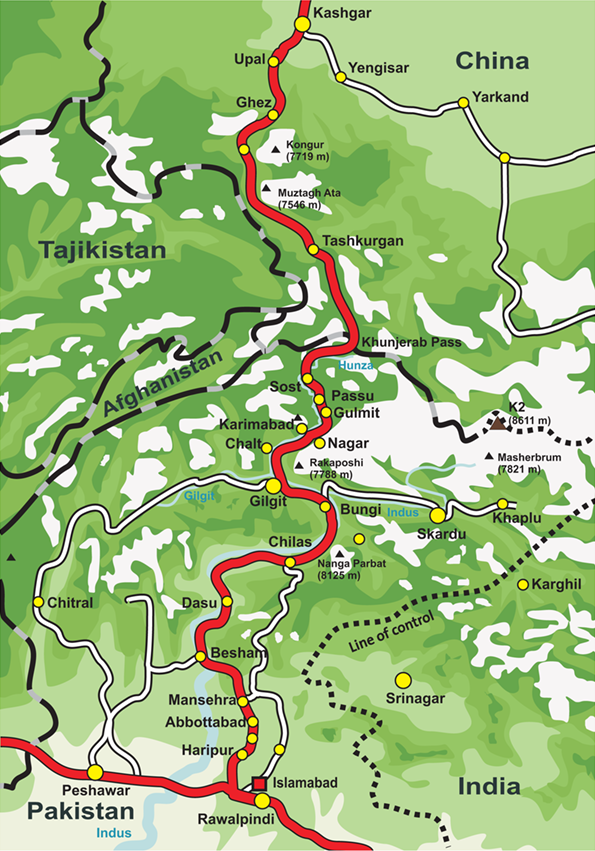
Map of the Karakoram Highway including Yengisar

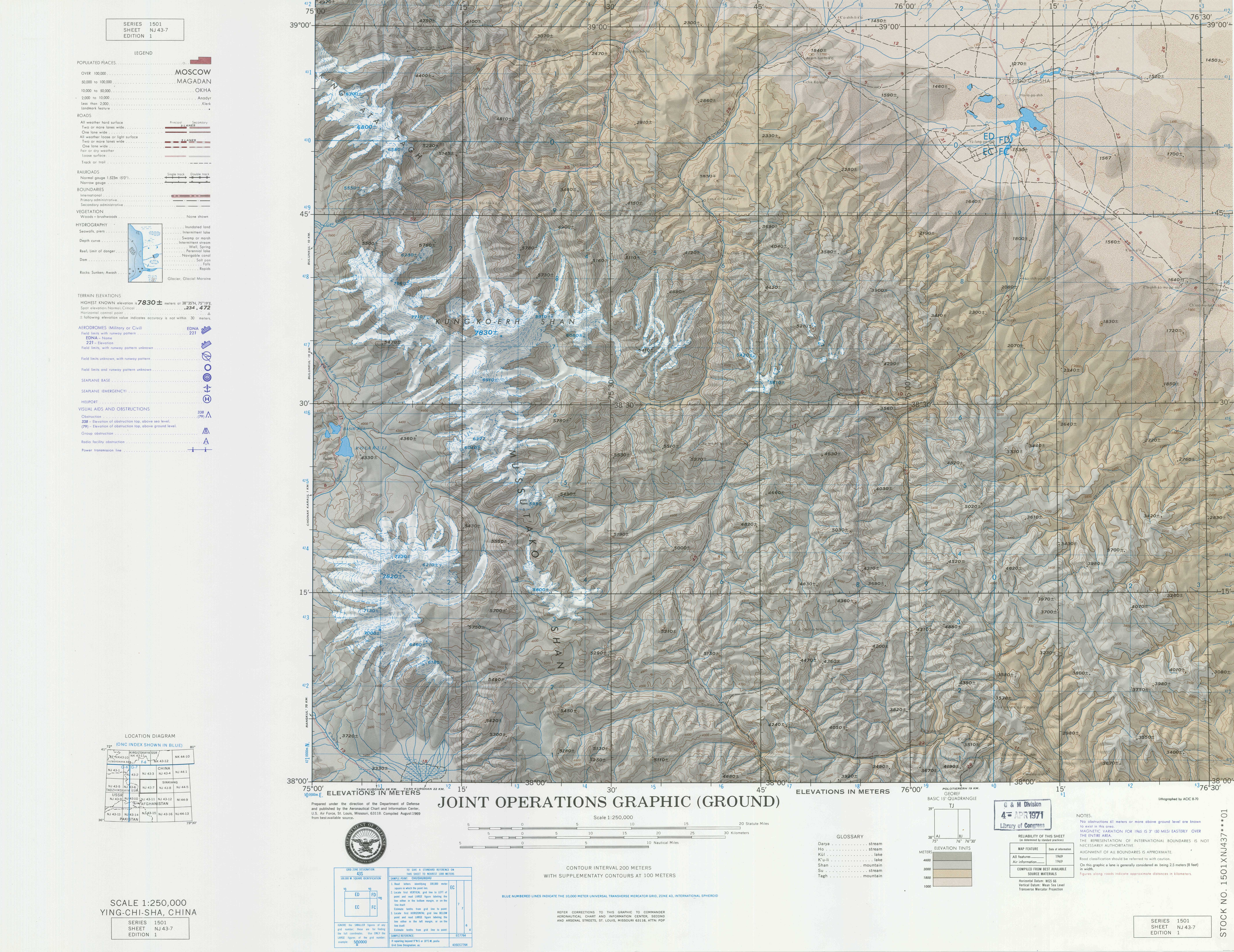
Map including Yengisar (labeled as YING-CHI-SHA) (ACIC, 1969)

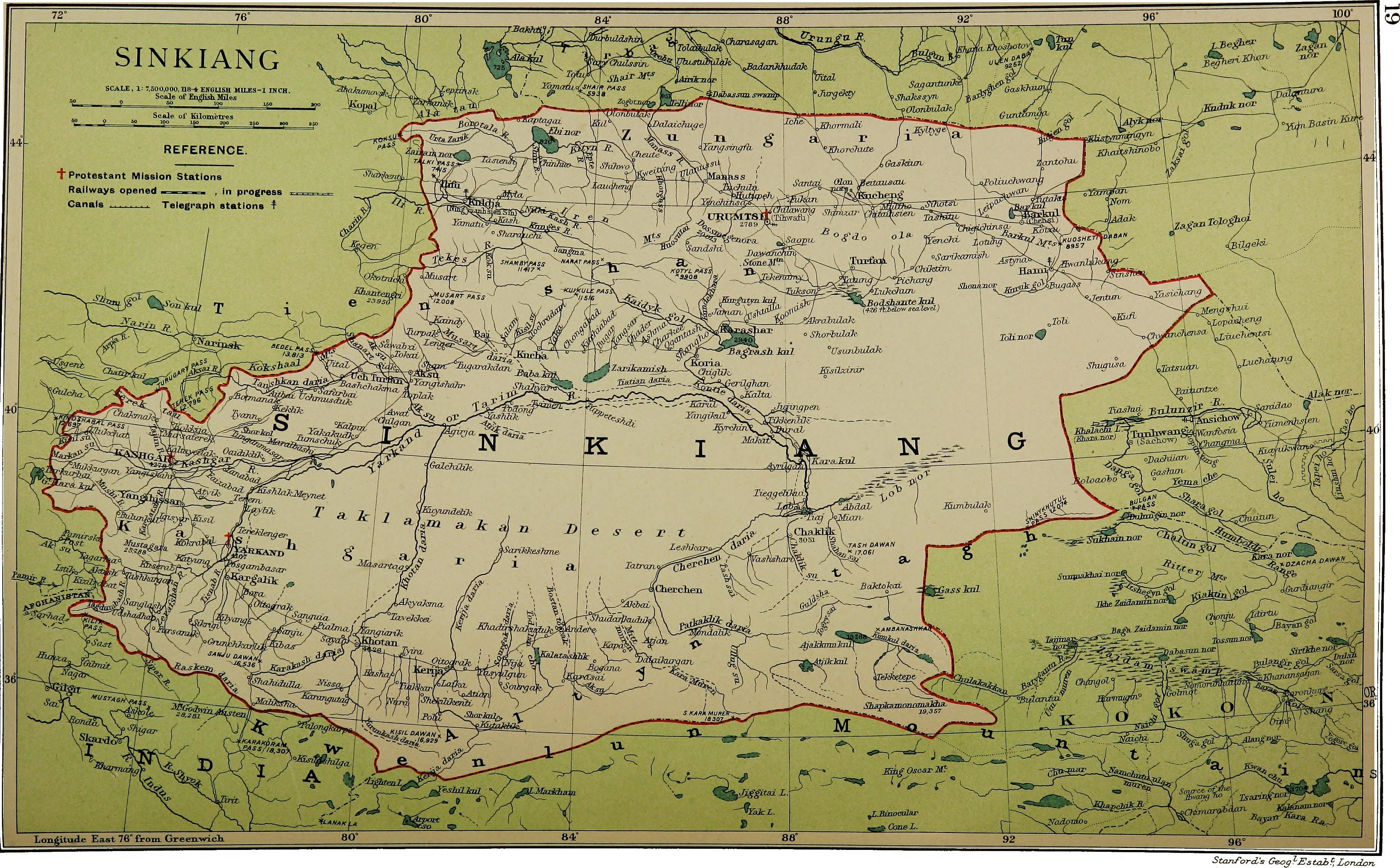
Map including Yengisar (labeled as Yangihissar) (1917)

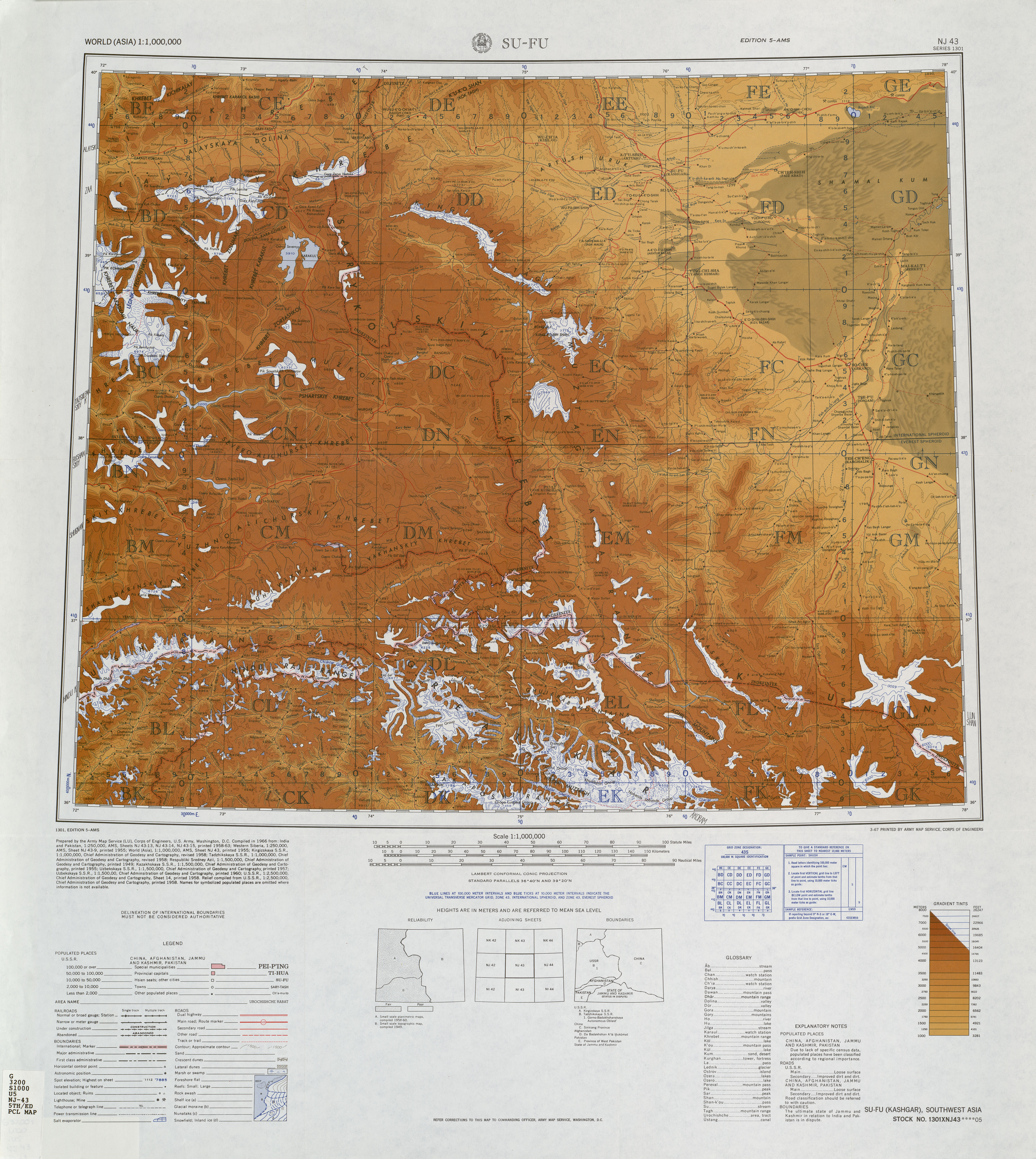
Map including Yengisar (labeled as YING-CHI-SHA (YANGI HISSAR)) and surrounding region from the International Map of the World (AMS, 1966)

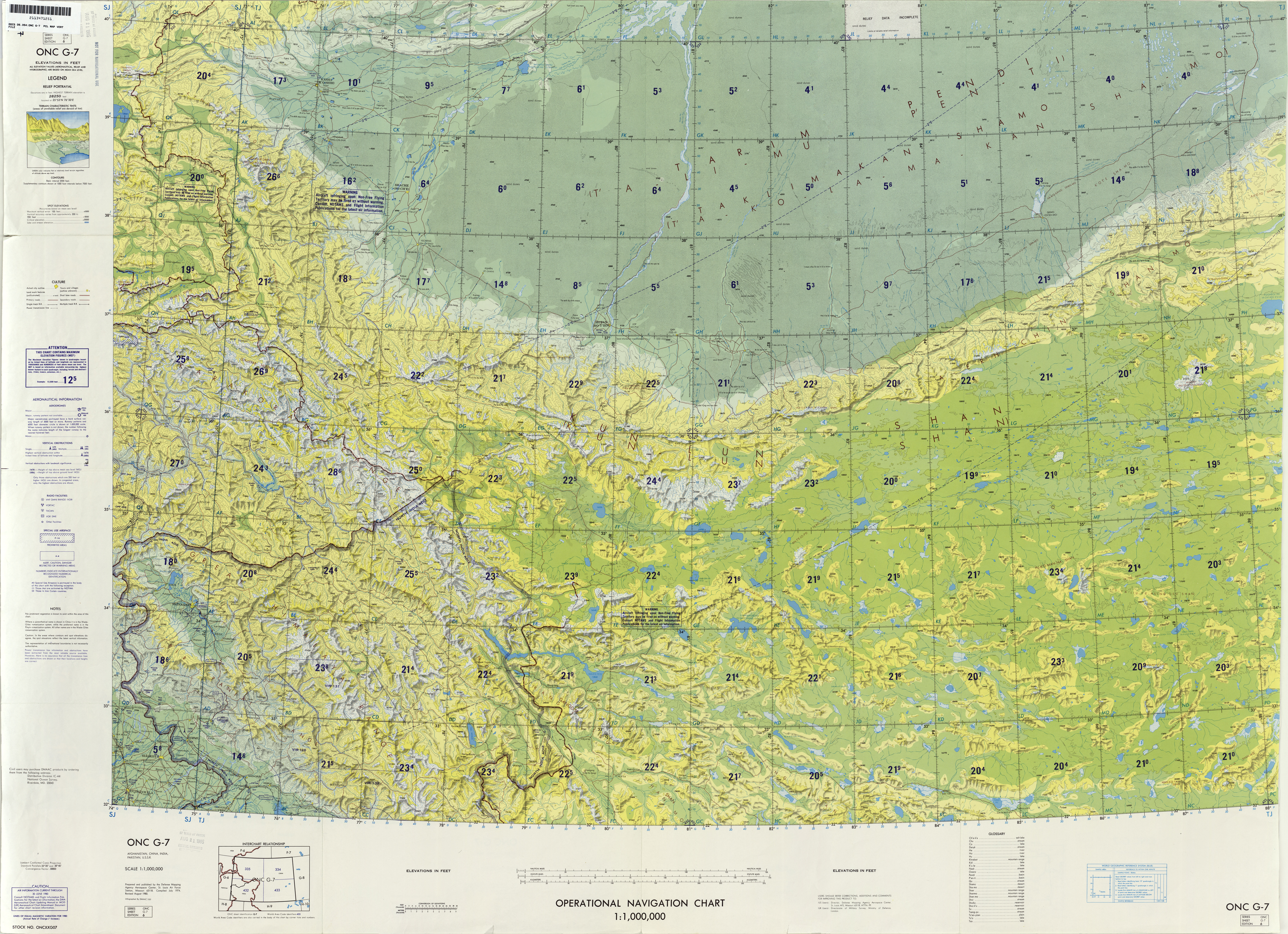
From the Operational Navigation Chart; map including Yengisar (Ying-chi-sha) (DMA, 1980) (Note: From map: "The representation of international boundaries is not necessarily authoritative.")

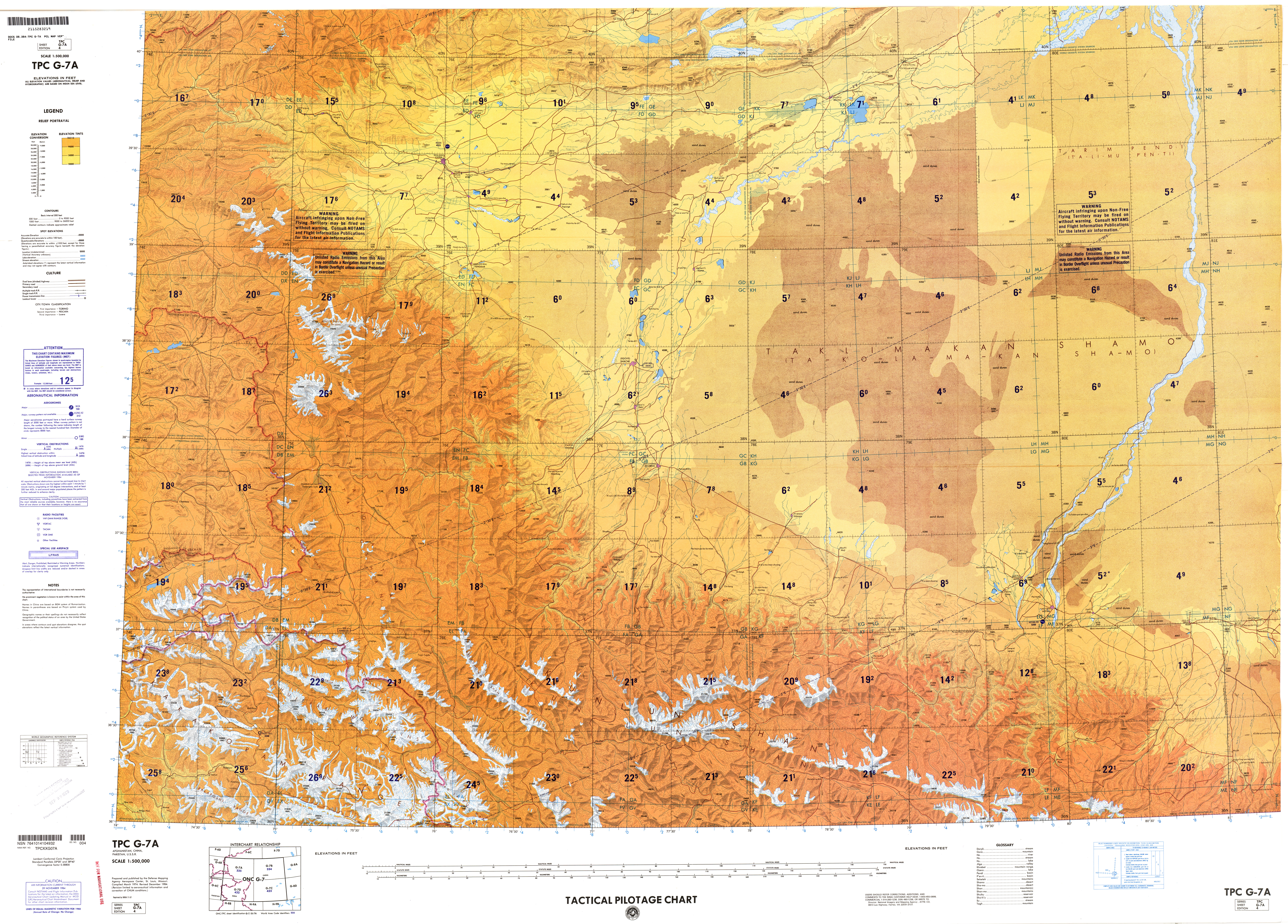
Map including Yengisar (Ying-chi-sha) (DMA, 1984) (Note: From map: "The representation of international boundaries is not necessarily authoritative")

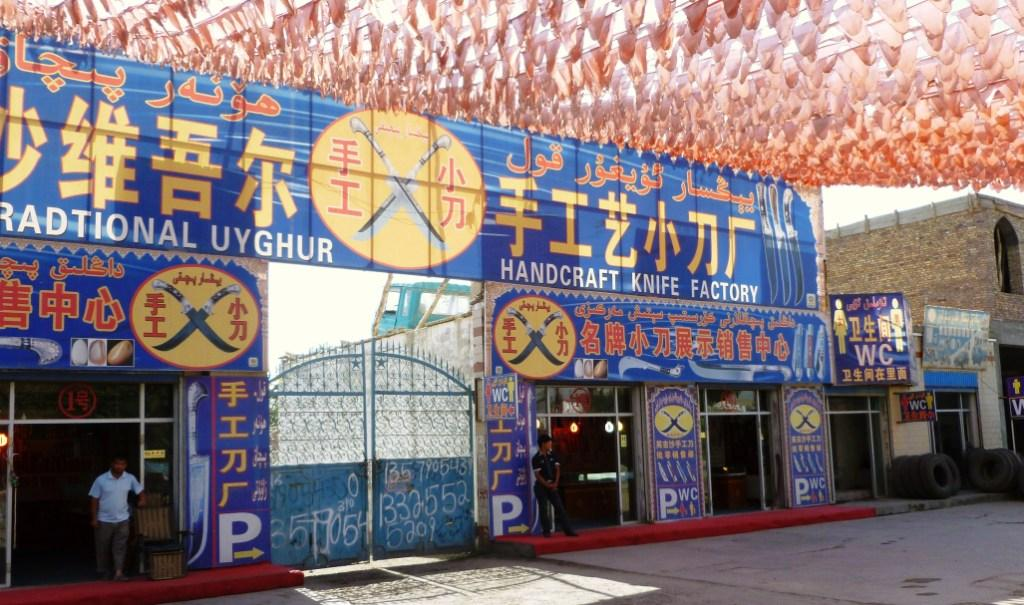
Yengisar Knife Factory

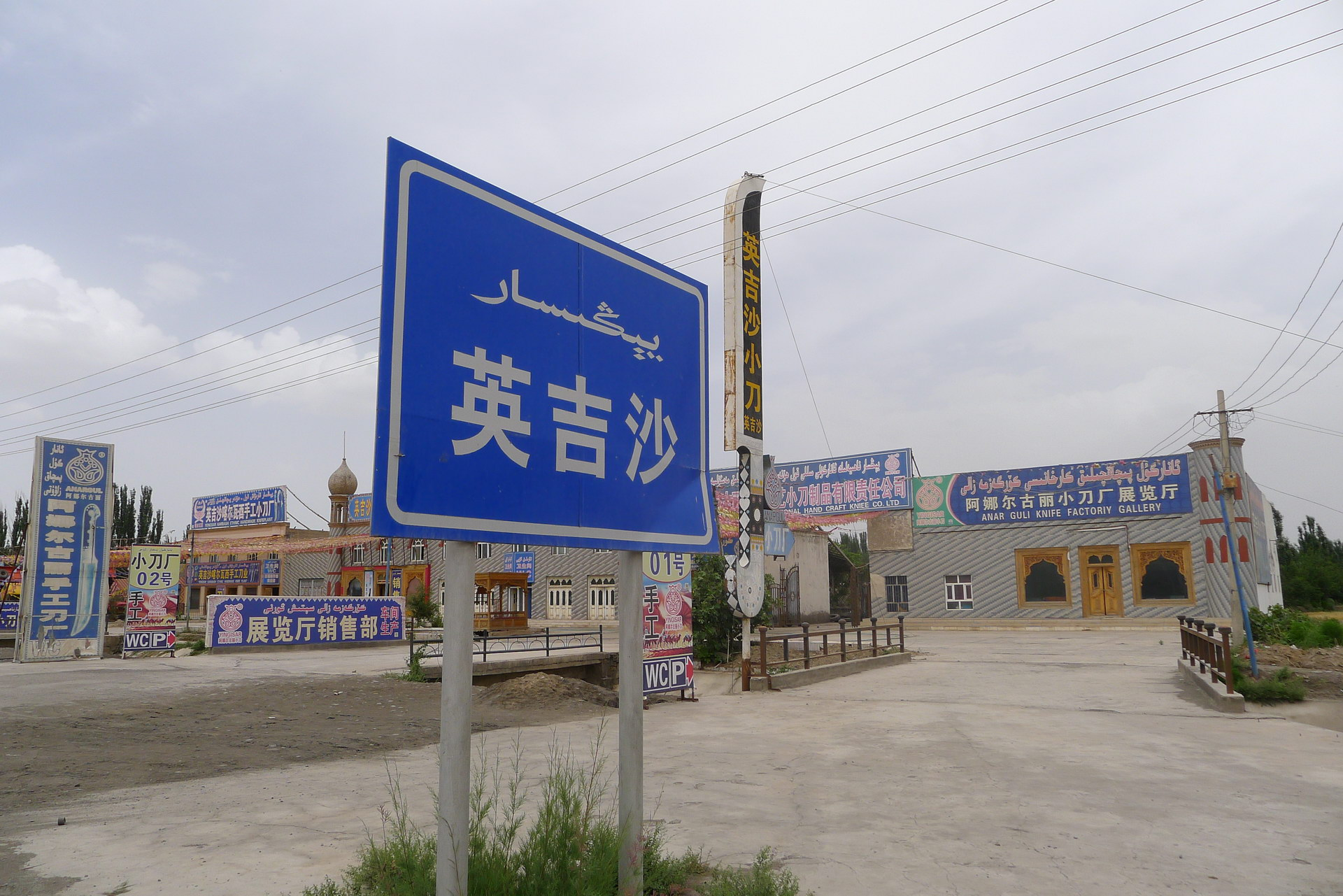
Yengisar
يېڭىسار
英吉沙

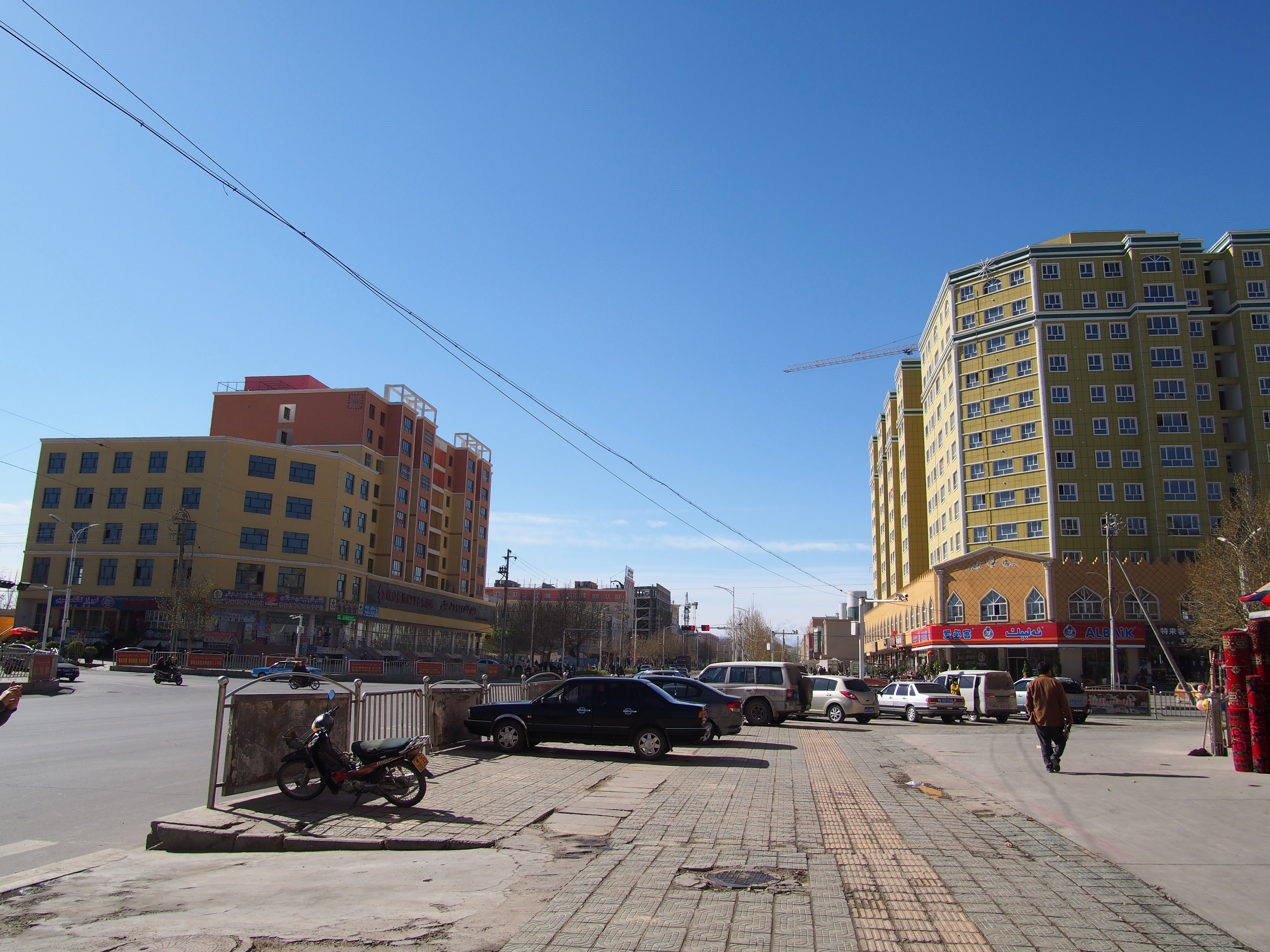
