= Ma Fuyuan =

20th-century Chinese Muslim general

Ma Fuyuan 馬福元
- Born: Gansu, China
- Military career
- Allegiance: China
- Branch: Army
- Service years: 1929–1937
- Rank: General
- Unit: New 36th Division
- Commands: New 36th Division
- Conflicts: Kumul Rebellion; Battle of Kashgar (1934); Battle of Yarkand; Battle of Yangi Hissar

Ma Fuyuan (simplified Chinese: 马福元; traditional Chinese: 馬福元; pinyin: Mǎ Fúyuán; Wade–Giles: Ma Fu-yüan) was a Chinese Muslim general of the New 36th Division (National Revolutionary Army), who served under Generals Ma Zhongying and Ma Hushan. He was present with Ma Zhongying, Ma Shih-ming, Ma Shih-lu, and Ma Ho-ying during a meeting with Yulbars Khan. He fought against Uighur and Kirghiz rebels of the First East Turkestan Republic and against the pro-Soviet Uighur Khoja Niyaz at Aksu, driving Khoja Niyaz to Kashgar. He and General Ma Zhancang destroyed the First East Turkestan Republic after defeating Uighur and Kirghiz fighters at the 1934 battles of Kashgar, Yarkand, and Yangi Hissar. Several British citizens at the British consulate were killed by the new 36th division. After entering Kashgar, Ma publicly proclaimed his allegiance to the Republic of China government in Nanjing and announced that Ma Shaowu was reappointed as the Taoyin of Kashgar.
