= Kumul Rebellion =

Rebellion in Xinjiang, China (1931–1934)

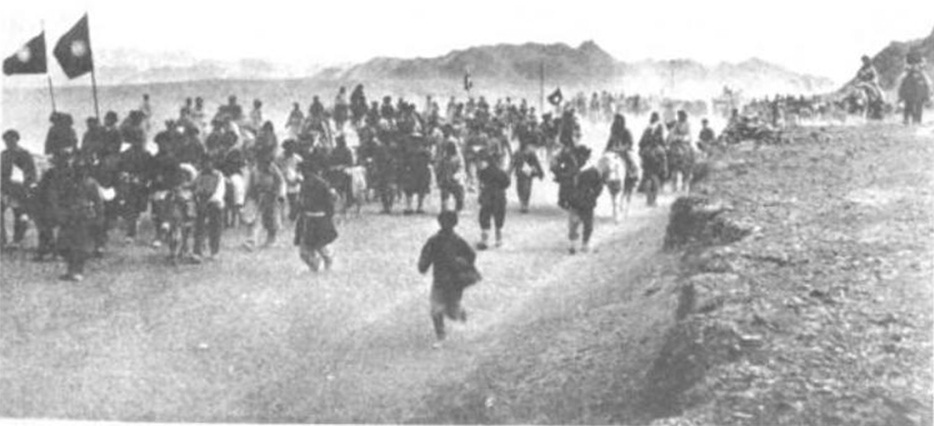
- Turkic conscripts of the New 36th Division near Kumul
Date	20 February 1931 – July 1934
Location	Xinjiang Province, Republic of China
Result	Stalemate: Defeat of the Turkic Islamic Republic of East Turkestan (First East Turkestan Republic)
Territorial changes	Chinese warlord Sheng Shicai and the Xinjiang clique take control of Northern Xinjiang, while the Chinese Nationalist government retains Southern Xinjiang.

Belligerents
Republic of China: Ma clique	Xinjiang clique: White Russians; Soviet Union	Turkic Islamic Republic of East Turkestan

Commanders and leaders
Chiang Kai-shek; Ma Zhongying; Ma Hushan; Ma Zhancang; Zhang Peiyuan †; Huang Shaohong; Yulbars Khan; Khoja Niyaz (until July 1933)	Jin Shuren; Sheng Shicai; Zhang Peiyuan †; Ma Shaowu; Khoja Niyaz (after July 1933); Pavel Pappengut (executed)	Muhammad Amin Bughra (surrendered); Khoja Niyaz; Osman Batur; Abdullah Bughra †; Nur Ahmadjan Bughra †; Timur Beg †; Osman Ali; Tawfiq Bay (WIA); Sabit Damolla (executed)

Units involved
National Revolutionary Army: New 36th Division; Kumulik Uyghurs	Han, Hui, and White Russian troops	Uyghur and Kyrgyz local fighters, as well as Afghan volunteers

Strength
Around 10,000 Hui cavalry and infantry, 15,000 Han infantry, and several thousand Kumul Khanate loyalists	Several thousand Han troops, 250 White Russians, some Hui troops	Thousands

Casualties and losses
- Thousands

The Kumul Rebellion (Chinese: 哈密暴動; pinyin: Hāmì bàodòng; lit. 'Hami Uprising') was a rebellion from 1931 to 1934 of Kumulik Uyghurs who conspired with Hui Chinese Muslim General Ma Zhongying to overthrow Jin Shuren, the governor of Xinjiang Province. The Kumulik Uyghurs were loyal to the Kumul Khanate and wanted to restore the heir to the khanate and overthrow Jin. The Kuomintang wanted Jin removed because of his unapproved negotiations with the Soviet Union, so Chinese Premier Chiang Kai-shek secretly approved of the operation while ostensibly acknowledging Jin as governor. The rebellion eventually catapulted into large-scale fighting as Khotanlik Uyghur rebels in Southern Xinjiang started a separate rebellion for independence in collusion with Kyrgyz rebels. The various groups of rebels were not united and some even fought each other.

== Background ==
Governor Jin Shuren (Chin Shu-jen) came to power shortly after the assassination of Xinjiang (Sinkiang) Governor Yang Zengxin (Yang Tseng-sin) in 1928. Jin was notoriously intolerant of the local Turkic peoples (i.e. the Uyghurs and Kyrgyz) and openly antagonised them. Such acts of discrimination included restrictions on travel, increased taxation, seizure of property without due process, and frequent executions for suspected espionage or disloyalty. Jin also had Hui Chinese Muslims (formerly Tungans) in his provincial army such as Ma Shaowu.

In 1930 Jin annexed the Kumul Khanate, a small semi-autonomous state lying within the borders of Xinjiang. The Kumul khans were Chagataids, and hence the last ruling descendants of Genghis Khan. According to British missionaries Mildred Cable and Francesca French, who knew the last khan Maqsud Shah, the existence of the Khanate of Kumul was important to the Uyghurs, who tolerated Chinese rule so long as their own government was established at Kumul under the proud title of "King of the Gobi". Jin, pressed for funding and swamped with Han Chinese refugees fleeing warlordism elsewhere in China, decided to annex the khanate to seize its revenues and use its lands to take in refugees. The newly subjected Kumuliks' land was expropriated by the provincial government and given to Han settlers. As a result, rebellion broke out on 20 February 1931, and many Han were massacred by the local population. The uprising threatened to spread throughout the entire province. Yulbars Khan, an advisor at the Kumul court, appealed for help to Ma Zhongying, a Hui warlord in Gansu (Kansu), to overthrow Jin and restore the khanate. Some scholars alternately describe a Han officer forcing a Uyghur woman to marry him as the event that triggered the rebellion.

Ma's troops marched to Kumul and laid siege to government forces there. Although he was victorious elsewhere in the area, Ma was unable to capture the city. After being wounded that October in a battle in which Jin's forces included 250 White Russian troops whom he had recruited from the Ili valley (where they had settled after the Bolshevik victory in the Russian Civil War), Ma withdrew his forces to Gansu (where he was nursed by Mildred Cable and the sisters Francesca and Eva French, whom he kept captive until he had recovered). This would temporarily leave the Turkic rebels to fight Jin alone.

The Kumulik Uyghur commanders Yulbars and Khoja Niyaz had also been receiving aid from the Mongolian People's Republic (Outer Mongolia), which itself had received assistance from the Soviet Union.

Ma meanwhile had a secret agreement with the Kuomintang, the party which governed China's central government: if he won Xinjiang, he would be recognised by the Kuomintang as the legitimate ruler of the province. Ma was officially appointed commanding officer of the New 36th Division of the National Revolutionary Army by the Kuomintang government in Nanjing. Asked to intervene against Jin on behalf of the Turkic population, Ma readily agreed.

=== Soviet aid to Jin Shuren ===
Jin bought two biplanes from the Soviet Union in September 1931 at 40,000 Mexican silver dollars each. They were equipped with machine guns and bombs and flown by Russian pilots. He signed a secret treaty with the Soviet Union in October 1931 that quickly led to suppression of the Kumul Rebellion and the deblockading of Kumul by provincial troops on 30 November 1931. Jin received large gold credits from the Soviet government for acquiring arms and weapons from the Soviet army and opening Soviet trade agencies in eight provincial towns: Ghulja, Chuguchak, Altai, Ürümqi, Karashahr, Kucha, Aksu, Kashgar, Yarkand, and Khotan. The Kuomintang wanted Jin removed since he had signed the treaty with the Soviets without central government approval.

== Separate uprising in Southern Xinjiang ==
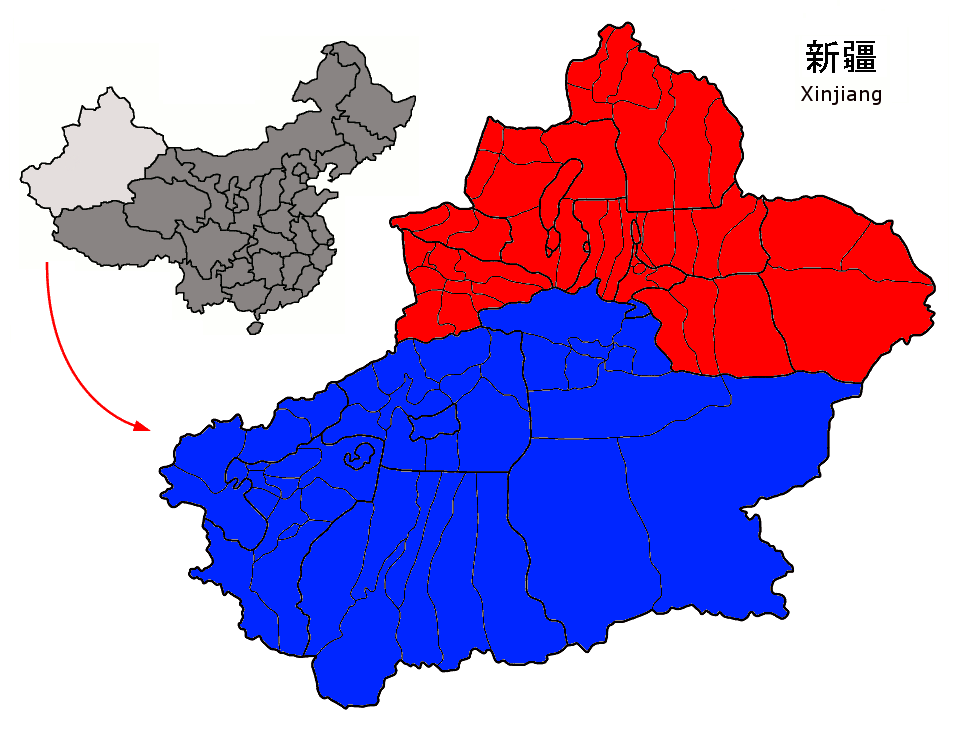
Xinjiang divided into northern (Dzungaria, in red) and southern (Altishahr, in blue) regions

A separate Uyghur uprising emerged in Khotan, located in Southern Xinjiang. It has been suggested that the United Kingdom may have supported this rebellion as a means to counter Soviet influence. Unlike the Kumulik Uyghurs, whose primary goal was the restoration of the Kumul Khanate and the removal of Jin Shuren, the Khotanlik Uyghurs sought complete independence and harboured strong opposition toward both the Han and Hui populations. They were led by Muhammad Amin Bughra and his brothers Abdullah Bughra and Nur Ahmadjan Bughra. Their leader, Sabit Damulla Abdulbaki, called for the expulsion of the Hui (Tungans) in a proclamation:

The Tungans, more than Han, are the enemy of our people. Today our people are already free from the oppression of the Han, but still continue live under Tungan subjugation. We must still fear the Han, but cannot not fear the Tungans also. The reason, we must be careful to guard against the Tungans, we must intensively oppose them, cannot afford to be polite, since the Tungans have compelled us to follow this way. Yellow Han people have not the slightest thing to do with Eastern Turkestan. Black Tungans also do not have this connection. Eastern Turkestan belongs to the people of Eastern Turkestan. There is no need for foreigners to come be our fathers and mothers...From now on we do not need to use foreigner's language or their names, their customs, habits, attitudes, written languages, etc. We must also overthrow and drive foreigners from our boundaries forever. The colours yellow and black are foul...They have dirtied our Land for too long. So now it's absolutely necessary to clean out this filth. Take down the yellow and black barbarians! Live long Eastern Turkestan!

The Republic of China's Xinjiang Province, claimed in its entirety by the Turkic Islamic Republic of East Turkestan.

The Khotanlik Uyghurs and Kyrgyz formed an independent regime, the Turkic Islamic Republic of East Turkestan (TIRET), also known as the First East Turkestan Republic. On 20 February 1933, the Committee for National Revolution set up a provisional government in Khotan with Sabit as prime minister and Muhammad as head of the armed forces. It favoured the establishment of an Islamic theocracy. Foreign volunteers who arrived to help the rebels included Tevfik Pasha, a pan-Islamist and former minister of the Saudi king Ibn Saud. Tevfik formed cooperative ties with the Japanese ambassador to Afghanistan Kitada Masamoto, who was also closely monitoring the rebellion.

The rebellion in Khotan became entangled with the one in Kumul, when a Hui and Uyghur army under Ma Zhancang (Hui) and Timur Beg (Uyghur) marched on Kashgar against the Hui warlord Ma Shaowu and his garrison of Han troops. Ma Shaowu began to panic and started raising Kyrgyz levies under Osman Ali to defend the city. The Kyrgyz were not amused at how their rebellion was crushed the previous year by Ma Shaowu, but now he wanted them to defend the city; they defected en masse to the enemy. However, Ma Zhancang also entered into secret negotiations with Ma Shaowu; he and his troops soon defected to the Han garrison in the city.

During the Battle of Kashgar (1933) the city changed hands multiple times as the confused factions battled each other. The Kyrgyz began to murder any Han and Hui they could get their hands on, and fighting broke out in the streets. Timur Beg became sympathetic to the pro-independence rebels of Sabit and Muhammad, while Ma Zhancang proclaimed his allegiance to the Kuomintang government and notified everyone that all former Chinese officials would keep their posts. Ma Zhancang consequently arranged for Timur Beg to be killed and beheaded on 9 August 1933, displaying his head outside of Id Kah Mosque.

Afghan King Mohammad Zahir Shah provided weapons and support to the TIRET. The Soviets and their warlord Sheng Shicai, who had become the military governor of Xinjiang, accused Ma Zhongying, who was ardently anti-Soviet, of being used by the Japanese to set up a puppet regime in Xinjiang, as they had done in Manchuria with Manchukuo. Sheng claimed that he captured two Japanese officers on Ma's staff. However, not a single claim of Sheng's could be proven, and he did not provide any evidence for his allegations that Ma was colluding with the Japanese. Ma Zhongying publicly declared his allegiance to the Kuomintang at Nanjing. Ma himself was given permission by the Kuomintang to invade Xinjiang.

=== Christians and Hindus ===
The explicitly Islamic TIRET was openly hostile towards Christianity and espoused a pan-Islamist, pan-Turkic ideology. The Bughras implemented Sharia (Islamic law) on 16 March 1933 and ejected the Khotan-based Swedish missionaries. In the name of Islam, Uyghur emir Abdullah Bughra violently assaulted the Yarkand-based Swedish missionaries and sought to execute them. However, they were spared and instead banished due to the British who interceded in their favour. The TIRET, having banished the Swedish missionaries, tortured and jailed Christian converts, mainly Uyghurs and Kyrgyz. Many converts were executed, such as Uyghur Habil, who was executed in 1933 after refusing to give up his Christian religion. Others were beheaded by the emir's followers. The TIRET also subjected converts such as Joseph Johannes Khan to imprisonment, torture, and abuse after he refused to give up Christianity in favour of Islam. After the British interceded to free Joseph, he was instead banished from his homeland and arrived in Peshawar (in present-day Pakistan) in November 1933.

The Swedish Mission Society had previously run a printing operation. The Bughra-led government repurposed the Swedish Mission Press to print and distribute media from Life of East Turkestan, the state-run media of the rebels.

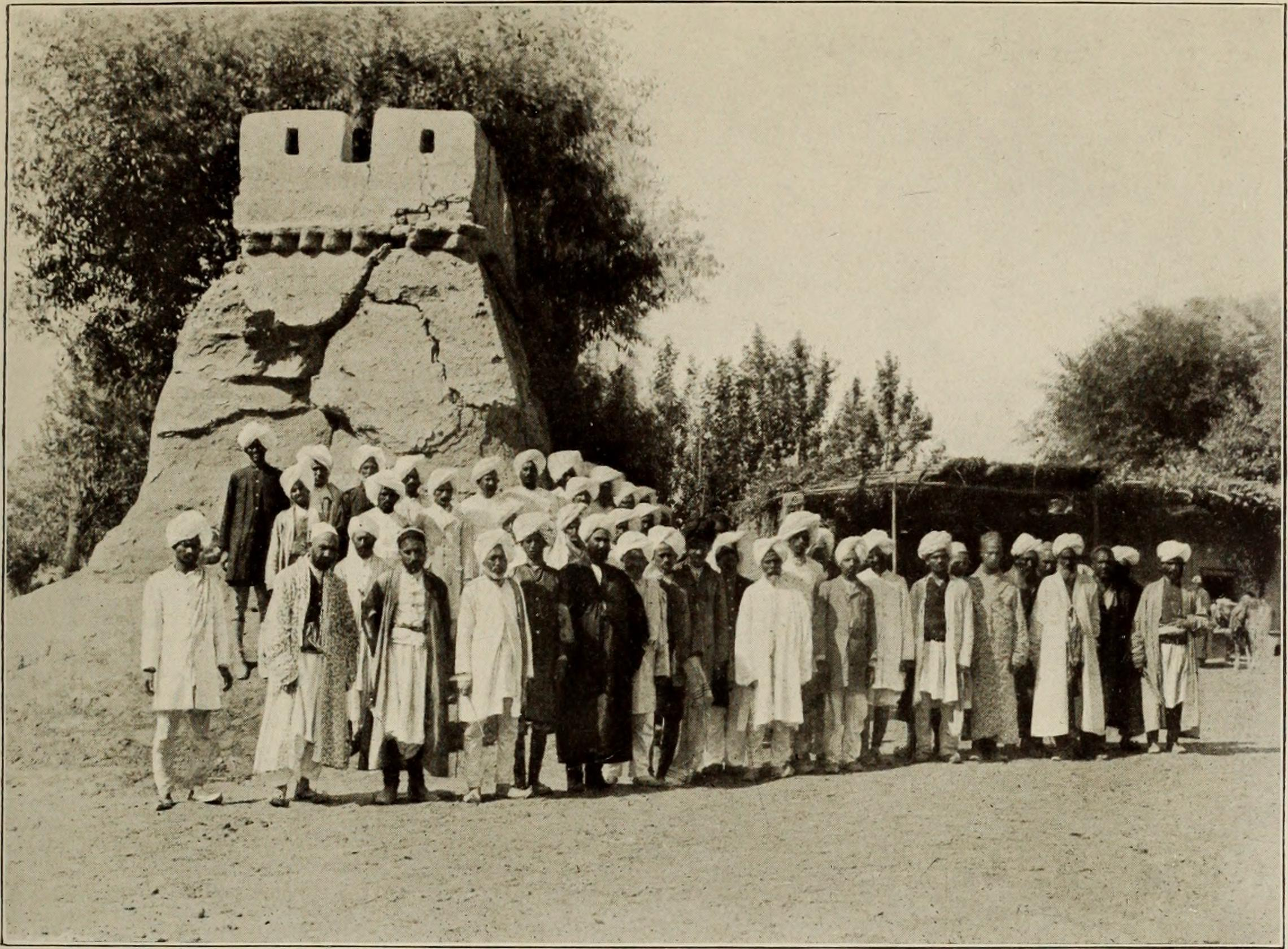
Pre-rebellion Hindu trading community near Yarkand, early 20th century

The forced removal of the Swedes was accompanied by the slaughter of Hindus in Khotan by the Turkic Muslim rebels. The emirs of Khotan killed the Hindus amid the expulsion of the Swedes and declaration of Sharia. Hostility towards Hindus predated the establishment of the TIRET. Han, Hindu, Armenian, Jewish, and Russian men married Uyghur women who could not find husbands. Uyghur merchants would harass Hindu money lenders by shouting at them when they ate beef or by hanging cow skins on their quarters. Hindu money lenders engaging in a religious procession were also attacked by Uyghur. In 1896 two Uyghurs attacked a Hindu merchant and the British consul in Kashgar George Macartney demanded the Uyghurs be punished by flogging.

Antagonism against the Hindus ran high among the Uyghur rebels in Southern Xinjiang. Uyghurs plundered the possessions in Karghalik of Rai Sahib Dip Chand, who was the aksakal of Britain, and his fellow Hindus on 24 March 1933, and in Keryia they slaughtered Hindus. These Hindu diaspora communities originated from Sindh's Shikarpur district. The slaughter of the Hindus became known as the "Karghalik Outrage", in which Uyghurs killed nine of them. The killing of two Hindus at the hands of Uyghurs took place in the Shamba Bazaar. The Uyghurs plundered the valuables of slaughtered Hindus in Posgam on 25 March as on the previous day in Karghalik. Killings of Hindus also took place in Khotan at the hands of the Bughra emirs.

== Japanese attempt to set up a puppet state ==
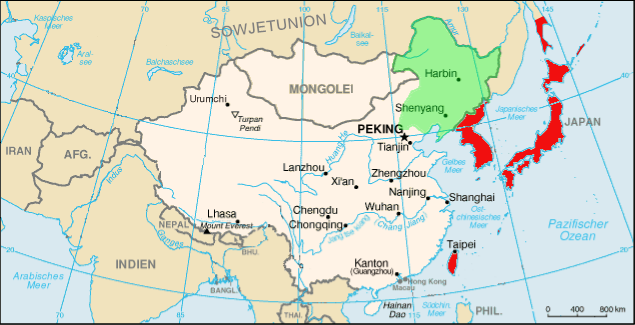
Map of Manchukuo, which the Turkish government accused Japan of attempting to replicate in Xinjiang

The Japanese invited an Ottoman prince, Abdulkerim, and several anti-Atatürk Young Turk exiles from Turkey to assist them in setting up a puppet state in Xinjiang with the Ottoman prince as sultan. Mustafa Ali was the Turkish advisor to the Uyghurs in the TIRET. Muhsin Çapanoğlu was also an advisor, and they both had pan-Turanist views. Mahmud Nedim Bey, another of their colleagues, was also an advisor to the Uyghur separatists.

The Turkish government under Mustafa Kemal Atatürk reacted angrily at this plot and the Turkish embassy in Japan denounced the Japanese plan to create a puppet state, labelling it a "Muslim Manchukuo". Soviet news agency TASS claimed Sabit invited "Turkish emigrants in India and Japan, with their anti-Kemalist organizations, to organize his military forces."

== Ma Zhongying returns ==
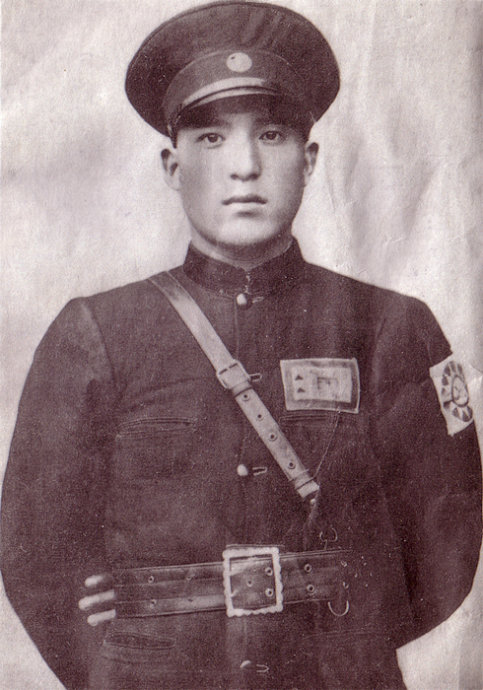
General Ma Zhongying, KMT 36th Division Chief. He is wearing a Kuomintang armband like many of his troops did.

Ma Zhongying returned to Xinjiang in 1933 to continue the war. Ma Zhongying had an ambition to create an empire covering the whole of Soviet and Chinese Central Asia.

Ma and his army used banners and armbands with the Blue Sky with a White Sun emblem of the Kuomintang. Ma himself wore a Kuomintang armband and a New 36th Division uniform to signify that he was a legitimate representative of the Chinese government.

Due to his severe abuse and brutality, both the Turkic and Han locals hated the Hui officer who was in charge of Barkul, Ma Ying-piao, whom Ma Zhongying had appointed.

Kumul was easily taken, as were other towns en route to the provincial capital. Sheng's forces retreated to Ürümqi. Ground was alternately gained and lost by both sides. During this time Ma's forces became notorious for their cruelty to both Turkic and Chinese inhabitants, destroying the economy and engaging in wholesale looting and burning of villages. Once seen as a liberator by the Turkic population, which had suffered greatly under Jin, many Turkic inhabitants of the region now ardently hoped for Ma's expulsion by Sheng and an end to the seesaw military campaigns by both sides. Ma also forcibly conscripted Uyghurs into his army, turning them into infantry while only Hui were allowed to be officers. This led to outrage among the Uyghurs at Kumul. Meanwhile, the Han commander of Ili, Zhang Peiyuan, entered into secret negotiations with Ma, and the two joined their armies together against Jin and the Russians.

At this point in April 1933, Jin's White Russian Cossack troops in Ürümqi mutinied and overthrew him, installing his subordinate Sheng to take his place. Under Soviet and Chinese communist advice, Sheng implemented a system of ethnocultural autonomy, including appointing the former Kumul rebel Khoja Niyaz as deputy governor of Xinjiang.

Huang Mu-sung, a native of Kumul and a "Pacification Commissioner" from the Kuomintang government, soon arrived in Ürümqi on an ostensible peace mission. Sheng suspected him of conspiring with some of his opponents to overthrow him. He turned out to be correct, since the Kuomintang secretly ordered Ma Zhongying and Zhang Peiyuan to attack Sheng's regime in Ürümqi. As a result, he executed three leaders of the provincial government, accusing them of plotting his overthrow with Huang. At the same time Sheng also forced Huang to wire Nanjing with a recommendation that he be recognised as the official tupan of Xinjiang.

Chiang Kai-shek sent Luo Wen'gan to Xinjiang, and Luo met with Ma and Zhang, urging them to destroy Sheng. Ma and Zhang then began a joint attack on Sheng's Manchurian and White Russian force during the Second Battle of Ürümqi (1933–34). Zhang seized the road between Tacheng and the capital. Sheng Shicai commanded Manchurian and White Russian troops commanded by Colonel Pavel Pappengut.

== Soviet invasion ==
Ma and Zhang's Han and Hui forces were on the verge of defeating Sheng when he requested help from the Soviet Union, leading to the Soviet invasion of Xinjiang. In January 1934 Soviet troops crossed the border and attacked rebel positions in the Ili area. Zhang's forces were defeated and he committed suicide. Despite valiant resistance, Ma's troops were forced to retreat from the Soviet military's aerial bombing and were pushed back from Ürümqi during the Battle of Tutung. Soviet assistance resulted in a rare, albeit temporary, White Russian and Soviet military alliance against Ma. Ma wiped out a Soviet armoured car column at the Battle of Dawan Cheng. Kamal Kaya Efendi, a former Ottoman Turkish military officer who was Ma's chief of staff, was captured by Soviet agents in Kumul, but instead of being executed he was made Commissar for Road Construction in Xinjiang, possibly because he was a Soviet agent himself.

Western traveller Peter Fleming speculated that the Soviet Union was not in Xinjiang to keep out the Japanese but to create their own sphere of influence. Unfortunately for the White Russian émigrés, the Soviet army stationed NKVD units to purge the White Russians on the basis that they might be a threat to Sheng.

== Destruction of the TIRET ==
Ma's retreating forces began advancing down towards Southern Xinjiang to destroy the TIRET. He sent out an advance guard under Ma Fuyuan to attack the Khotanlik Uyghurs and Kyrgyz at Kashgar. At this point Chiang was ready to send Huang Shaohong and his expeditionary force of 15,000 troops to assist Ma against Sheng, but when Chiang heard about the Soviet invasion he decided to withdraw to avoid an international incident if his troops directly engaged the Soviets. Georg Vasel, a German hired by the Chinese central government to build airstrips along the former Silk Road, recounted the massacres of the war. On one occasion, the road between Kumul and Ürümqi he was driving on was so strewn with corpses that he could not avoid them without causing the truck to overturn, and he had to drive directly over the corpses. When his White Russian driver, when meeting Ma, asked "Must I tell him that I am a Russian? You know how the Tungans hate the Russians", Vasel told him to pretend to be German.

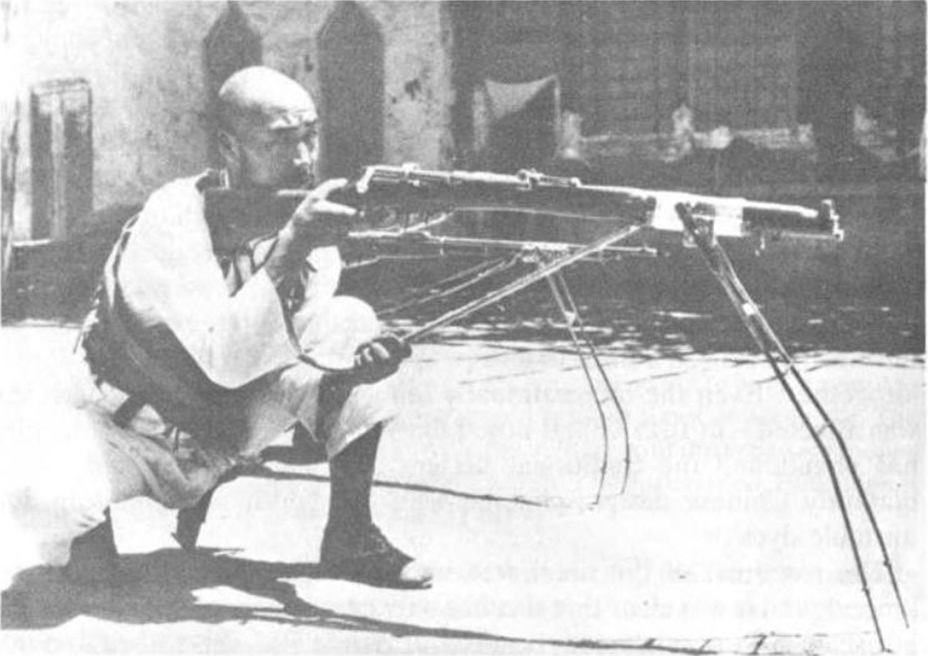
Hui rifleman of the New 36th Division during training

The Hui forces retreating from the north linked up with Ma Zhancang's forces in Kashgar, allied themselves with the Kuomintang and attacked the TIRET, forcing Niyaz, Sabit, and the rest of the government to flee on 6 February 1934 to Yengi Hissar, south of the city. The Hui army crushed the Uyghur and Kyrgyz armies of the TIRET at the Battle of Kashgar (1934), Battle of Yarkand and Battle of Yangi Hissar. In the aftermath of the TIRET, the Hui under Ma Zhongying's brother-in-law General Ma Hushan governed Southern Xinjiang in the name of the Chinese central government. The Turkic populace called Ma Hushan their padishah (king).

Meanwhile, in nearby Kashgar, the representatives of Sheng, including Chinese nationalist Christian Liu Bin and Turpan merchant Mahmud Shizhang, took over control of the city. Sheng had the Xinjiang provincial official previously in charge, Ma Shaowu, summoned to Ürümqi. When Ma Shaowu, sensing a trap, refused to go, he was subject to an assassination attempt which forced him to seek medical care in the Soviet Union. Conflict began brewing when Liu Bin, unaware of Muslim sensitivities, put up a picture of the Republic of China founding father Sun Yat-sen in the Id Kah Mosque of Old Kashgar, while pro-Soviet Kyrgyz under Uyghur communist Qadir Beg took over local policing. They implemented a reformed education curriculum based on importing teachers from Soviet Central Asia. Local Uyghurs began disenchanted, seeing these moves as a Bolshevik plan to destroy religion.

== Major battles ==
=== Battle of Aksu ===
A minor battle from February to May 1933, in which Hui troops were expelled from the Aksu oases of Xinjiang by Uyghurs led by Ismail Beg 40 miles north of the mountains. On 25 February rebel forces entered Aksu Old City, shot all the Han and Hui residents, and seized their property.

=== Kizil massacre ===
Uyghur and Kyrgyz fighters broke their agreement not to attack a column of retreating Han and Hui soldiers from Yarkand New City. The Uyghur and Kyrgyz fighters massacred 800 Han and Hui civilians.

=== Battle of Sekes Tash ===
A minor battle in which Hui troops under General Ma Zhancang attacked and defeated Uyghur and Kyrgyz armies at Sekes Tesh. About 200 Uyghur and Kyrgyz were killed.

=== Battle of Kashgar ===
Uyghur and Kyrgyz forces, led by the Bughra brothers and Tawfiq Bay, attempted to take the New City of Kashgar from Hui troops under General Ma Zhancang. They were defeated. Tawfiq Bay, a Syrian Arab traveller who held the title Sayyid (descendant of prophet Muhammed) and arrived in Kashgar on 26 August 1933, was shot in the stomach by Hui troops in September. Previously Ma Zhancang arranged to have the Uyghur leader Timur Beg killed and beheaded on 9 August 1933, displaying his head outside of the Id Kah Mosque.

Han troops commanded by Brigadier Yang were absorbed into Ma Zhancang's army. A number of Han officers were spotted wearing the green uniforms of Ma Zhancang's unit of the New 36th Division; presumably they had converted to Islam.

During the battle the Kyrgyz prevented the Uyghur from looting the city, mainly because they wanted to loot it themselves. They stole the belongings of, and started murdering, the concubines and spouses of the Han and Hui, who were women of Turkic origin.

=== First Battle of Ürümqi (1933) ===
Hui and Uyghur forces under Ma Shih-ming and Khoja Niyas attempted to take Ürümqi from a force of provincial White Russian troops under Colonel Pavel Pappengut and the Northeast Salvation Army under Sheng Shicai. They were driven back after fierce fighting. During the battle, Han Chinese General Zhang Peiyuan, of Ili, refused to help Jin Shuren repulse the attack, a sign that relations between the two were becoming strained.

=== Khoja Niyas Hajji Rebellion ===
The Battle of Toksun or the Khoja Niyas Hajji Rebellion occurred in July 1933 after Khoja Niyas Hajji, a Uyghur leader, defected with his forces to Sheng Shicai. He was appointed by Sheng through agreement to be in charge of Southern Xinjiang and also the Turpan Basin. Satisfied with this agreement, he marched away from Ürümqi south across Dawan Ch'eng of the Tian Shan Mountains and occupied Toksun in the Turpan Basin. However, he was badly defeated by the Hui forces of General Ma Shih-ming, who forced him to retreat to Karashar in eastern Kashgaria, where he had his headquarters during July, August, and September 1933. There, he defended mountain passes and roads that led from Turpan Basin to Kashgaria in a fruitless attempt to stop the advancement of Tungan armies to the south.

=== Second Battle of Ürümqi (1933–34) ===
Ma Zhongying conducted secret negotiations with Han Chinese General Zhang Peiyuan for a joint attack against Sheng Shicai's provincial Manchurian and White Russian troops in Ürümqi. They joined their armies together and began the attack. Zhang seized the road between Tacheng and the capital. The Kuomintang secretly encouraged Zhang and Ma through Huang Mu-sung to attack Sheng's forces, because of his Soviet connections and to regain the province. Their forces almost defeated Sheng, but then Sheng cabled the Soviet Union for help, which led to the Soviet invasion of Xinjiang.

=== Battle of Kitai ===
In May 1934 Ma Chung-chieh (Ma Zhongying's brother) led the New 36th Division in an attack on Qitai County against Xinjiang clique forces and managed to win the battle. According to Wu, losses during the capture of Kitai were 1,000 killed or wounded. Ma Chung-chieh was reportedly killed in a moment of "inspired but utterly reckless bravery" when attempting to scale the walls in the face of machine-gun fire.

=== Battle of Kashgar ===
New 36th Division General Ma Fuyuan led a Hui army to storm Kashgar on 6 February 1934, and attacked the Uyghur and Kyrgyz rebels of the TIRET. He freed another New 36th Division general, Ma Zhancang, who had been trapped with his Hui and Han troops in Kashgar New City by the Uyghurs and Kyrgyz since 22 May 1933. In January 1934 Ma Zhancang's Hui troops repulsed six Uyghur attacks launched by Khoja Niyaz, who arrived at the city on 13 January 1934; the failed attacks resulted in massive casualties to the Uyghur forces. From 1,700 to 2,000 Uyghur civilians in Kashgar Old City were massacred by Tungans in February 1934, in revenge for the Kizil massacre, after the retreat of Uyghur forces from the city to Yengi Hissar. The Hui and New 36th Division Chief General Ma Zhongying, who arrived at Kashgar on 7 April 1934, gave a speech at the Id Kah mosque in April, reminding the Uyghurs to be loyal to the Republic of China government in Nanjing. Several British citizens at the British consulate were murdered by troops from the New 36th Division. Ma Zhongying effectively destroyed the TIRET.

=== Battle of Yangi Hissar ===
Ma Zhancang led the New 36th Division to attack Uyghur forces at Yangi Hissar, wiping out the entire force and killing their leader, Emir Nur Ahmad Jan Bughra. The siege of Yangi Hissar citadel continued for about a week, during which 500 Uyghur defenders, armed only with rifles, inflicted several hundred casualties on Hui forces more heavily armed with cannons and machine guns. Quickly depleted of ammunition, Uyghur defenders employed tree trunks, large stones and oil fire bombs to defend the citadel. On 16 April 1934, Tungans managed to breach the walls of the citadel by successful sapping and put all the surviving defenders to the sword. It was reported by Ahmad Kamal in his book "Land Without Laughter" on page 130–131, that Nur Ahmad Jan's head was cut off by Hui troops and sent to the local parade ground to be used as a ball in soccer (football) games.

=== Battle of Yarkand ===
Ma Zhancang and Ma Fuyuan's Hui troops defeated Uyghur and Afghan volunteers sent by Afghan King Mohammed Zahir Shah and exterminated them all. The emir Abdullah Bughra was killed and beheaded, and his head put on display at the Id Kah mosque.

=== Battle of Khotan ===
In July 1934, General Ma Zhongying and Ma Hushan led the New 36th Division in an attack on Uyghur forces at Khotan, the last remaining city controlled by the entire Uyghur rebel force. The last gasp of the TIRET would be found in Khotan, with its leader Muhammad Amin Bughra having to surrender and go into exile in Afghanistan.

== See also ==
- Amur Military Flotilla
- Manchouli Incident
- Sino-Soviet conflict (1929)
- Soviet Invasion of Xinjiang
- Islamic rebellion in Xinjiang (1937)
- Ili Rebellion
