= Battle of Kashgar (1934) =

Military confrontation in the Xinjiang Wars

- Part of the Kumul Rebellion
Date	7–13 of January – February 1934
Location	Kashgar, Xinjiang
Result	New 36th Division victory

Belligerents
(Taiwan) Republic of China: (Taiwan) New 36th Division	First East Turkestan Republic	(Taiwan) Chinese Xinjiang Provincial Government

Commanders and leaders
(Taiwan) Ma Zhongying (Taiwan) Ma Zhancang (Taiwan) Ma Fuyuan (Taiwan) Ma Hushan	(First East Turkestan Republic) Nur Ahmad Jan Bughra (First East Turkestan Republic) Abdullah Bughra	Khoja Niyas Hajji

Strength
Several thousands Hui, Han Chinese, and Uyghur troops	Thousands of Turkic Muslim Uyghur and Kyrgyz fighters	Thousands of Turkic Uyghur fighters

Casualties and losses
- Thousands
- 1,700 to 2,000 (Note: Although, it was claimed by Uyghur Scholar Muhammad Emin Bughra in his book Dogu Turkistan, that 7,000 Uyghurs were massacred. However, there is no credible source or confirmed reports regarding this claim.) Uyghurs were killed in revenge for the Kizil massacre

The Battle of Kashgar (Chinese: 喀什戰役) was a military confrontation that took place in 1934 during the Kumul Rebellion. Turkic Muslim Uyghur and Kirghiz fighters under Emir Abdullah Bughra and other Turkic separatists began four separate attacks over a six-day period on Hui and Han Chinese soldiers led by Gen. Ma Zhancang, trapping them inside Kashgar. Khoja Niyas Hajji joined the attack with his own Kumul Uyghur fighters after a 300-mile trek from Aksu – from which he was driven out by a force of Chinese Muslims — appearing at the walls of Kashgar on 13 January. The Chinese Muslim and Chinese forces repulsed the Turkic fighters, inflicting severe casualties upon them.

Gen. Ma Fuyuan of the New 36th Division then stormed Kashgar and attacked the Uyghur and Kirghiz rebels of the First East Turkestan Republic. He freed Ma Zhancang and the trapped Chinese troops. Ma Zhancang and Ma Fuyuan then defeated and drove out the remaining Turkic fighters. Estimates are that 1,700-2,000 (or lower) Uighur civilians were killed in revenge for the Kizil massacre. In April 1934, Gen. Ma Zhongying personally gave a speech at Idgah mosque, telling the Uyghurs to be loyal to the Republic of China government at Nanjing. Several British citizens at the British consulate were murdered by troops of the New 36th Division in two separate incidents in March 1934. The Chinese Muslims were referred to as "Tungan tribesmen"; Initial reports were that 2,000 Uighurs and several members of the British consulate were killed. Some other sources say that between 1,700 and 2,000 Uighurs and British were killed in just two days. The Uyghurs were reinforced by troops from Yarkand and Hotan and by Kyrgyz tribesmen.
