= Emir =

Title of high office in the Muslim world

The court of the Durrani Emirate of Afghanistan (James Rattray, 1839)

Emir (/əˈmɪər, eɪˈmɪər, ˈeɪmɪər/; Arabic: أمير ʾamīr [ʔæˈmiːr], also transliterated as amir, is a word of Arabic origin that can refer to a male monarch, aristocrat, holder of high-ranking military or political office, or other person possessing actual or ceremonial authority. The title has a history of use in West Asia, East Africa, North Africa, West Africa, Central Asia, and South Asia. In the modern era, when used as a formal monarchical title, it is roughly synonymous with "prince", applicable both to a son of a hereditary monarch, and to a reigning monarch of a sovereign principality, namely an emirate. The feminine form is emira (أميرة ʾamīrah), with the same meaning as "princess".

Prior to its use as a monarchical title, the term "emir" was historically used to denote a "commander", "general", or "leader" (for example, Amir al-Mu'min). In contemporary usage, "emir" is also sometimes used as either an honorary or formal title for the head of an Islamic, or Arab (regardless of religion) organisation or movement.

Qatar and Kuwait are the only independent countries which retain the title "emir" for their monarchs. In recent years, the title has been gradually replaced by "king" by contemporary hereditary rulers who wish to emphasize their secular authority under the rule of law. A notable example is Bahrain, whose monarch changed his title from emir to king in 2002, whereas the titular United Arab Emirates use the title Sheikh instead of Emir for their subnational rulers.

== Origins ==
Amir, meaning "lord" or "commander-in-chief", is derived from the Arabic root a-m-r, meaning "command". Originally simply meaning "commander", it came to be used as a title of leaders, governors, or rulers of smaller states. In modern Arabic the word is analogous to the title "Prince". The word entered English in 1593, from the French émir.

== Princely, ministerial and noble titles ==
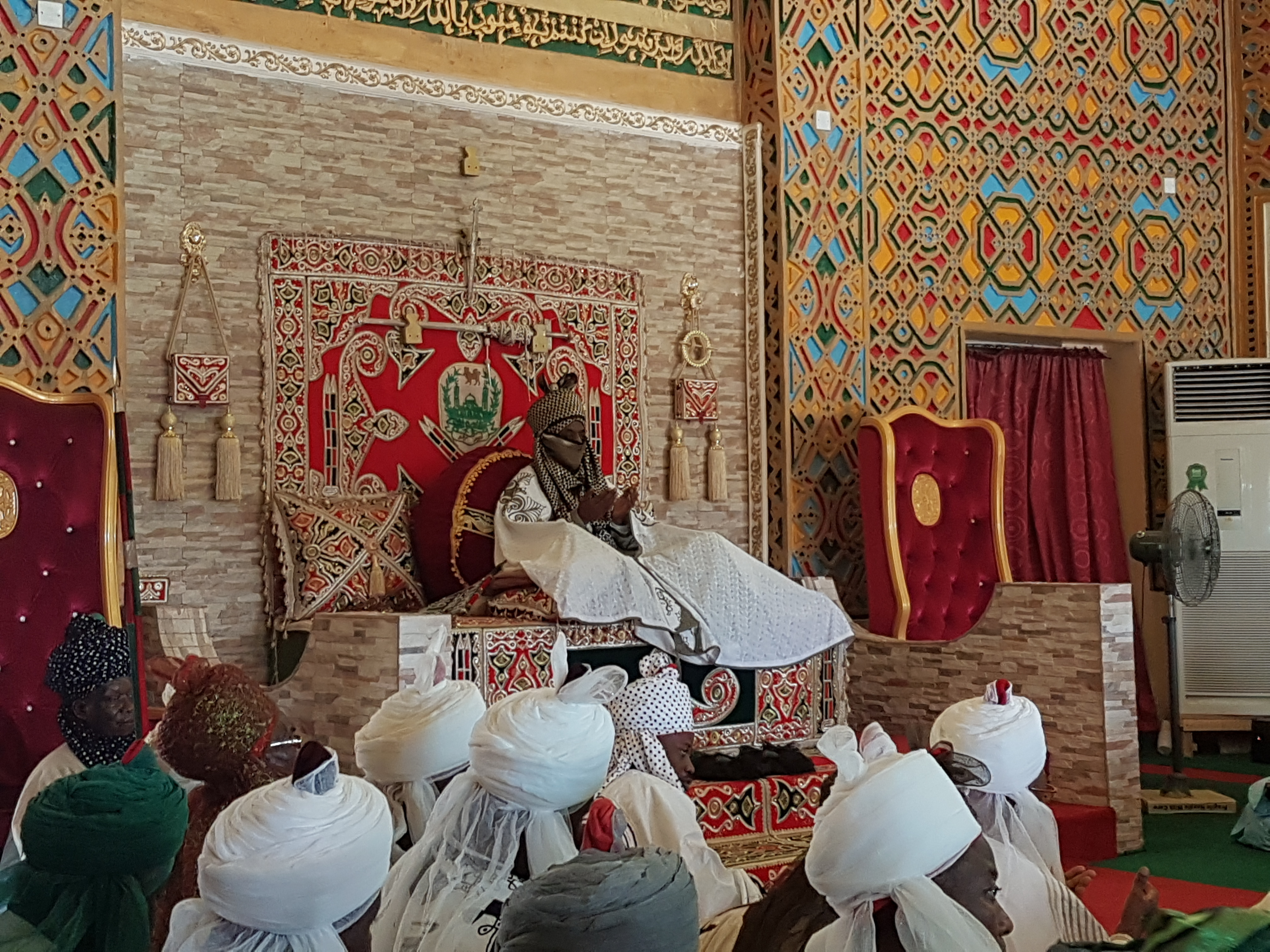
Emir of Kano, Sanusi Lamido Sanusi

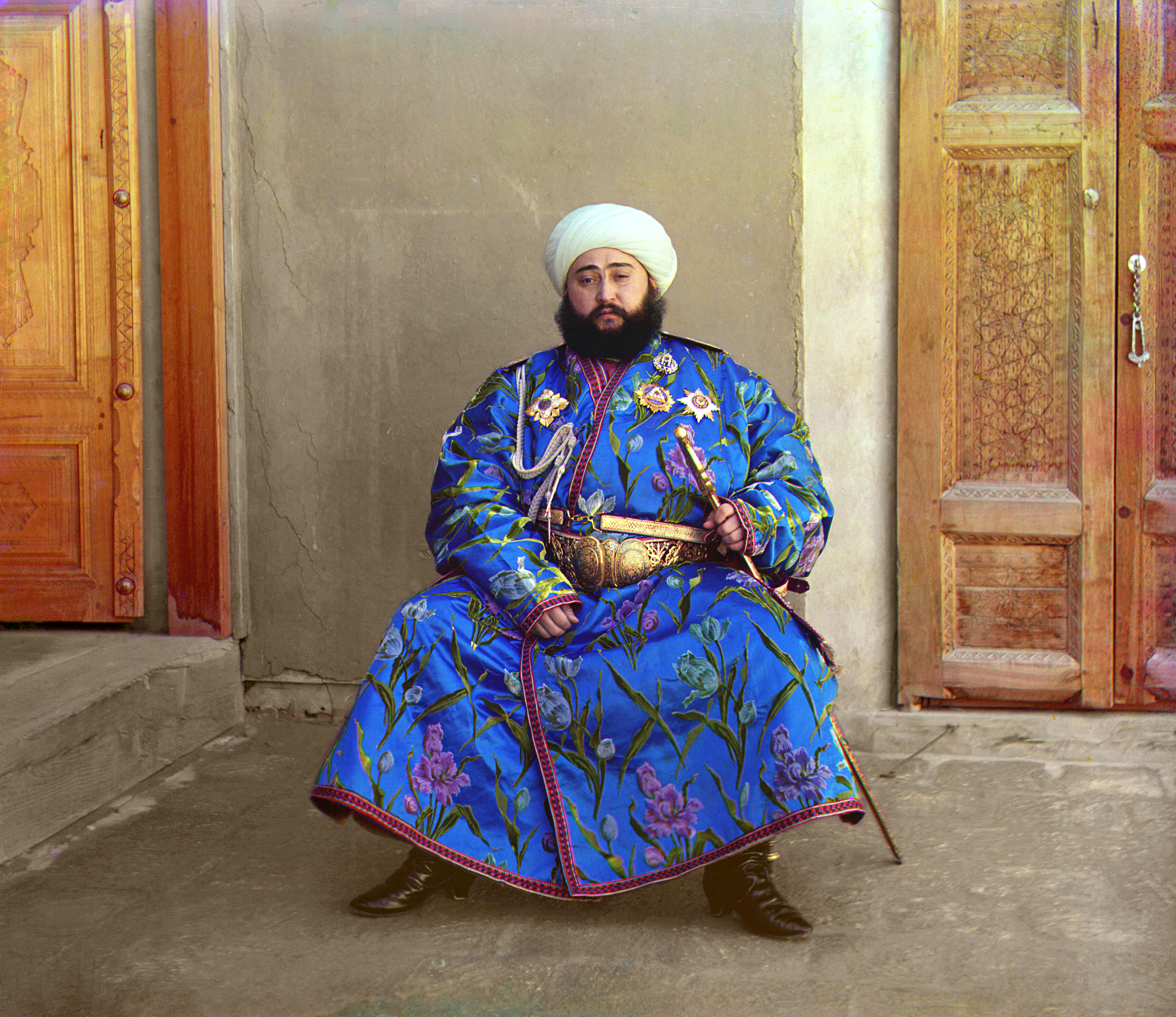
Mohammed Alim Khan, Emir of Bukhara, taken in 1911 by Sergey Prokudin-Gorsky

- The monarchs of Qatar and Kuwait are currently titled emir.
- All members of the House of Saud have the title of emir (prince).
- The caliphs first used the title Amir al-Muminin or "Commander of the Faithful", stressing their leadership over the Islamic empire, especially over the militia. The title has been assumed by various other Muslim rulers, including sultans and emirs. For Shia Muslims, they still give this title to the Caliph Ali as Amir al-Muminin.
- The Abbasid (in theory still universal) Caliph Al-Radi created the post of Amir al-Umara ("Amir of the Amirs") for Ibn Raik; the title was used in various Islamic monarchies; see below for military use. In Iraq, the direct descendants of previous Emirs from the largest tribes who ruled the kingdoms before modern statehood, use the title of Sheikh or Prince as the progeny of royalty.
- The theocratic and hereditary leader of the Yazidi community, the Mîr of the Sheikhan principality, is known as an emir or prince.
- Formerly in Lebanon, the ruling emir formally used the style al-Amir al-Hakim, specifying it was still the ruler's title. The title was held by Druze and Christians as well.
- The word emir is also used less formally for leaders in certain contexts. For example, the leader of a group of pilgrims to Mecca is called an amir al-hajj, a title sometimes used by ruling princes (as a mark of Muslim piety) which is sometimes awarded in their name. Where an adjectival form is necessary, "emiral" suffices.
- Amirzade, the son (hence the Persian patronymic suffix -zade) of a prince, hence the Persian princely title mirza.
- The traditional rulers of the predominantly Muslim northern regions of Nigeria are known as emirs, while the titular sovereign of their now defunct empire is formally styled as the Sultan of Sokoto, Amir-al-Muminin (or Sarkin Musulmi in the Hausa language).
- Afghanistan under the government of the Taliban is officially an emirate, with the leader of the Taliban bearing the title Amir al-Mu'minin.
- The Emir of al-Qaeda, a global pan-Islamist militant organization
- Amīr al-Baḥr (أمير البحر, "commander of the sea"), a position in the Fatimid navy, is frequently mistaken as the etymological origin of the English admiral, the French amiral, and similar terms in other European languages. The titles actually derive solely from Medieval Latin forms of emir itself, originally in reference to the "amirs al-umara" of Norman Sicily.
- The Constitution of Morocco uses the term Amir al-Mu'minin as the principal title of the King of Morocco, as a means to showcase the hegemonic role and Islamic legitimacy of the Monarch.

== Military ranks and titles ==
From the start, emir has been a military title. In the 9th century the term was used to denote a ruler of a state i.e. Italy's Emirate of Sicily.

In certain decimally-organized Muslim armies, Amir was an officer rank. For example, in Mughal India, the Amirs commanded 1000 horsemen (divided into ten units, each under a sipah salar), ten of them under one malik. In the imperial army of Qajar Persia:

- Amir-i-Nuyan
- Amir Panj, "Commander of 5,000"
- Amir-i-Tuman, "Commander of 10,000"

The following posts referred to "amir" under medieval Muslim states include:

- Amir al-umara, "Amir of Amirs" (cfr. supra) or 'Commander of Commanders'
- Amir al-hajj, "Commander of the Hajj [caravan]"
- Amir al-ʿarab, "Commander of the Arabs [Bedouin tribes]"

In the former Kingdom of Afghanistan, Amir-i-Kabir was a title meaning "great prince" or "great commander".

Muhammad Amin Bughra, Nur Ahmad Jan Bughra, and Abdullah Bughra declared themselves emirs of the First East Turkestan Republic.

== Other uses ==
- Amir is a masculine name in the Persian language and a prefix name for many masculine names such as Amir Ali, Amir Abbas.
- Amir-i-Iel designates the head of an Il (tribe) in imperial Persia.
- The masculine Amir and feminine Amira are Arabic-language names common among both Arabs regardless of religion and Muslims regardless of ethnicity, much as Latin Rex and Regina ("king" and "queen", respectively) are common in the Western world. In Bosnia and Herzegovina, the female name Emira, often interpreted as "princess", is a derivative of the male name Emir.
- The masculine Amir and feminine Amira are Hebrew-language names that are relatively common in Israel. In Hebrew the word can also mean "bundle of grain" or "treetop" depending on the spelling.
- Ameer of Bangladesh Jamaat-e-Islami

== See also ==
Related or similar titles:

- Bey
- Dux
- Imam
- Mir
- Mirza
- Padishah
- Pasha
- Rana
- Sayyid
- Shah
- Vizier

Present-day emirs:

- List of emirs of Kuwait
- List of emirs of Qatar
