= Battle of Yangi Hissar =

1934 battle of the Kumul Rebellion

- Part of the Kumul Rebellion
Date	April 1934
Location	Yangi Hissar, Xinjiang
Result	Republic of China victory

Belligerents
(Taiwan) Republic of China: (Taiwan) New 36th Division	First East Turkestan Republic

Commanders and leaders
(Taiwan) Ma Zhancang (Taiwan) Ma Fuyuan	(First East Turkestan Republic) Nur Ahmad Jan Bughra †

Strength
10,000 Chinese Muslim troops	2,500 Turkic Muslim Uighur and Kirghiz fighters

Casualties and losses
Several hundreds	2,500 killed, all Uighurs and Kirghiz wiped out

The Battle of Yangi Hissar (Chinese: 英吉沙戰役) was a confrontation that took place during the Xinjiang Wars. In April 1934 Gen. Ma Zhancang led the New 36th Division in an attack on Uighur forces at Yangi Hissar, wiping out the entire Uighur force of 2,500 and killing their leader, Emir Nur Ahmad Jan Bughra.

It was reported by Ahmad Kamal, that Nur Ahmad Jan was beheaded by the Chinese Muslim troops and the head was used in a football game at the parade ground.
