= Nur Ahmadjan Bughra =

Uyghur emir (died 1934)

Nur Ahmad Jan Bughra
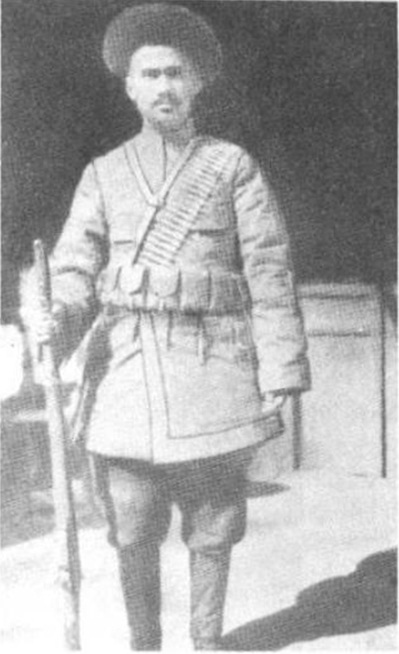
- Nur Ahmad Jan Bughra

Emir of the First East Turkestan Republic
- In office 1933 – April 16, 1934

Personal details
- Born: Khotan, Qing dynasty
- Died: April 16, 1934 Yangi Hissar, Republic of China
- Party: Young Kashgar Party; Committee for National Revolution
- Relations: Muhammad Amin Bughra, Abdullah Bughra

Nur Ahmad Jan Bughra (Uyghur: (Kona Yëziq) نۇر ئەخمەتجان بۇغرا, نور احمد جان بغرا, romanized: Nur Exmetjan Bughra; simplified Chinese: 努尔·阿合买提江·布格拉; traditional Chinese: 努爾·阿合買提江·布格拉; pinyin: Nǔ'ěr·Āhémǎitíjiāng·Bùgélā; died April 16, 1934) was an Uyghur emir of the First East Turkestan Republic. He was the younger brother of Muhammad Amin Bughra and Abdullah Bughra. He commanded Uyghur and Kirghiz forces during the Battle of Kashgar (1934) against the Chinese Muslim 36th Division (National Revolutionary Army). The Chinese Muslims were loyal to the Republic of China government and wanted to crush the Turkic Muslim Uyghurs and Kirghiz in revenge for the Kizil massacre, in which Nur Ahmad Jan Bughra had taken part. He was killed on April 16, 1934, at Yangi Hissar by Chinese Muslim troops under generals Ma Zhancang and Ma Fuyuan. All of Nur Ahmad Jan's 2,500 Uyghur and Kirghiz fighters were exterminated by the 10,000 strong Chinese Muslim army.

It was reported by Ahmad Kamal in his book Land Without Laughter, that Nur Ahmad Jan was beheaded by the Chinese Muslim troops and the head was used in a football game at the parade ground.
