= New 36th Division =

Former Chinese military unit

- Active: 1932–1937
- Country: Republic of China
- Branch: (Republic of China (1912–1949)) National Revolutionary Army
- Type: Cavalry (later Infantry)
- Garrison/HQ: Xinjiang, later Yunnan
- Engagements: Aksu; Sekes Tash; Kashgar 1st; Toksun; Kashgar 2nd; Yangi Hissar; Yarkand; Tutung; Dawan Cheng

Commanders
- Ceremonial chief: Ma Zhongying, Ma Hushan
- Notable commanders: Ma Zhongying, Ma Hushan, Ma Zhancang, Ma Fuyuan. Post reorganisation: Li Chih-peng

New 36th Division
- Traditional Chinese: 新編第三十六師
- Simplified Chinese: 新编第三十六师
Transcriptions
Standard Mandarin
- Hanyu Pinyin: Xīnbiān dì sānshíliù shī

The New 36th Division was a cavalry division in the National Revolutionary Army. It was created in 1932 by the Kuomintang for General Ma Zhongying, who was also its first commander. It was made almost entirely out of Hui Muslim troops, all of its officers were Hui, with a few thousand Uighurs forced conscripts in the rank and file. It was commonly referred to as the KMT 36th Division or Tungan 36th Division.

== Original organization ==
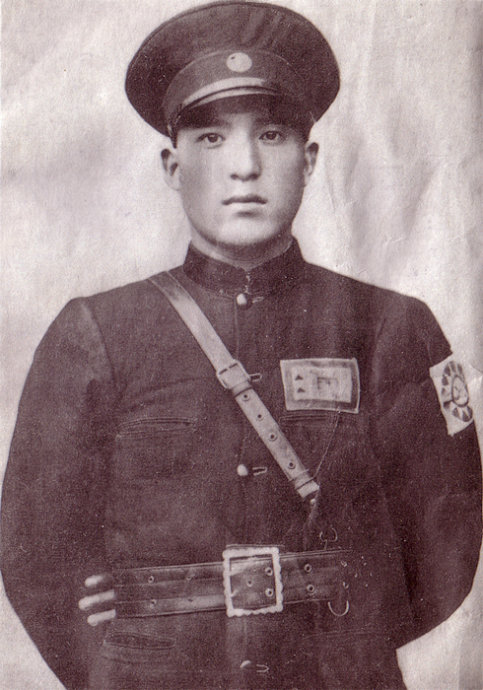
General Ma Zhongying.

General Ma Zhongying, a Muslim who had trained under Chiang Kai-shek at Whampoa Military Academy in Nanjing in 1929, was the new 36th Division commander.

Kamal Kaya Efendi, a Turk and a former Ottoman military officer was chief-of-staff to Ma Zhongying. The 1st Brigade was commanded by General Ma Ju-lung. The 2nd Brigade was commanded by General Ma Sheng-kuei.

Cavalry regiments were divided into 2,000 men each, by horse color, black, brown, or white. Infantry then followed cavalry.

Su Chin-shou was General Ma Zhancang's chief of staff. Pai Tzu-li was another commander in the New 36th Division.

An unnamed 36th Division general was encountered by Peter Fleming.

Ma Hushan was original Deputy Divisional Commander, then promoted to Chief of the 36th Division.

== Equipment ==
The New 36th Division was relatively well-equipped compared to other regional forces in Xinjiang. Using a mix of Kuomintang-supplied and captured Soviet weapons, the division's arsenal included Chinese Mauser-type rifles, which were standard among infantry; a limited number of ZB vz. 26 light machine guns; a number of captured Soviet DP-27s; and light cannons suited for use in Xinjiang's mountainous terrain. Additionally, many troops fought on horseback, using swords such as dadao and rifles for rapid attacks in open desert warfare.

Soviet rifles marked with 1930 dates were seized by Chinese Muslim soldiers from Russians during the Soviet Invasion of Xinjiang as war booty.

== Uniform and insignia ==
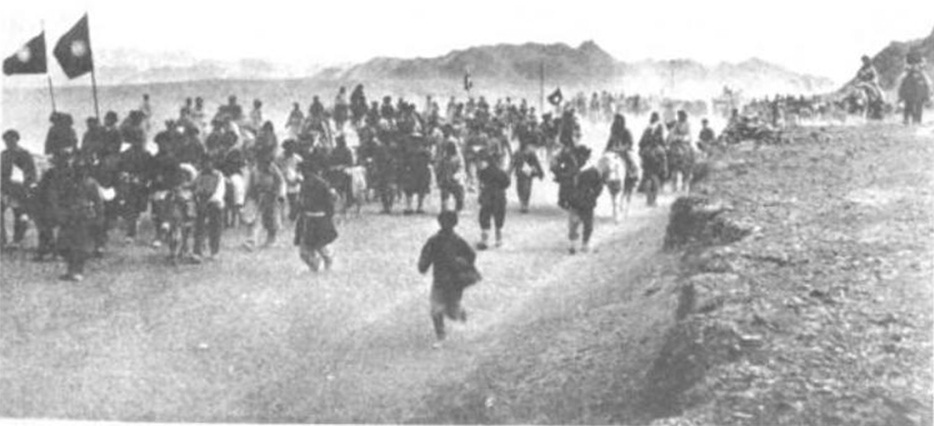
Turkic soldiers waving Kuomintang flags near Kumul.

Unlike the standard khaki-colored uniforms of most Kuomintang forces, the New 36th Division was known for its distinct green uniforms. The uniforms' dark green colour was better suited to the desert environment of Xinjiang, distinguished the division from other Chinese units, and was symbolic of Islam, which considers green to be a sacred colour. Many of the troops wore Kuomintang Blue Sky with a White Sun armbands, and used Kuomintang Blue Sky with a White Sun banners.

== Training ==
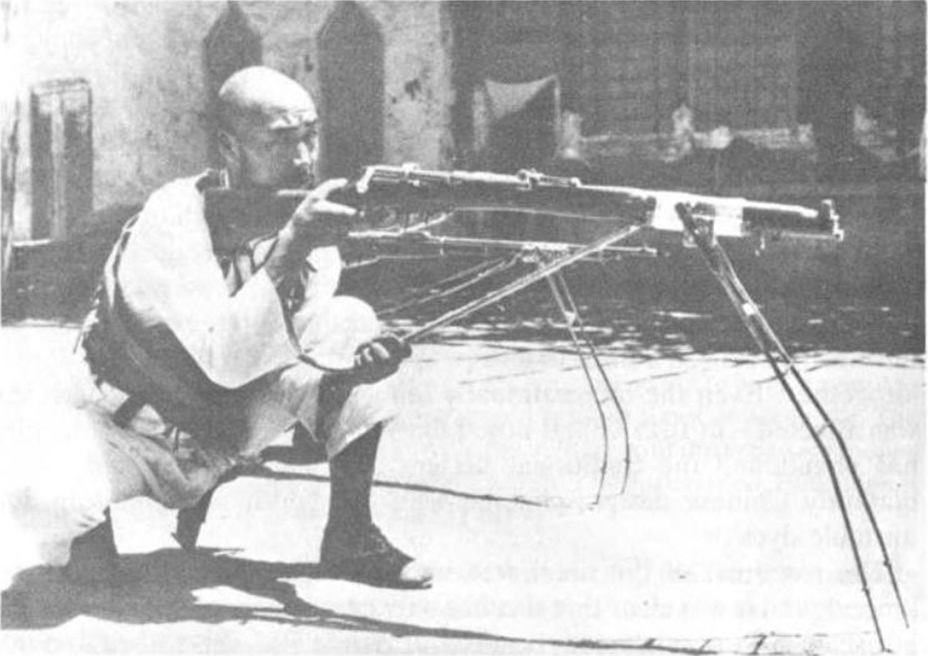
A Chinese Muslim rifleman of the New 36th Division during training

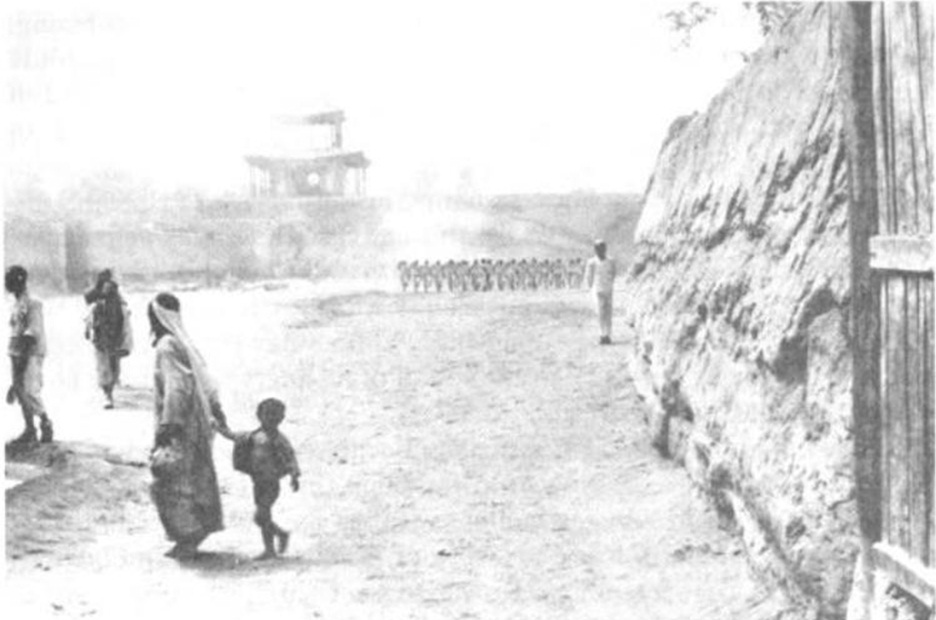
Watched by an Uighur woman with child, Tungan troops of the New 36th Division drill at Khotan in 1937.

Ma Zhongying made his men train in subzero temperatures, and they used shadow fencing to train and parallel bars for exercise. Ma Hushan forced his men to drill every day, conducting siege maneuvers and cavalry attacks. Peter Flemings said "I have never seen troops in China train so hard."

It is documented that troops sang Chinese Muslim marching songs; Ma Zhongying himself had a harmonium with him and spent hours playing Muslim hymns on it. He also kept Mauser pistols. Ma Zhongying cited as his role models Genghis Khan, Napoleon, Bismarck, Hindenburg, and Zuo Zongtang.

== Xinjiang War ==
=== Kizil massacre ===
Uighur and Kirghiz Turkic fighters broke their agreement not to attack a column of retreating Han Chinese and Chinese Muslim soldiers from Kashgar.

=== Battle of Aksu ===
A minor battle ensued in which Chinese Muslim troops were expelled from the Aksu oases of Xinjiang by Uyghurs when they rose up in revolt.

=== Battle of Sekes Tash ===
A minor battle involved Chinese Muslim troops under General Ma Zhancang attacking and defeating Uyghur and Kirghiz armies at Sekes Tesh. About 200 Uyghurs and Kirghiz were killed.

=== Battle of Kashgar (1933) ===
Uyghur and Kirghiz forces led by the Bughra brothers and Tawfiq Bay attempted to take the yamen and city center in Kashgar from Chinese Muslim troops under General Ma Zhancang. They were repealed.

Han Chinese troops commanded by Brigadier Yang were absorbed into Ma Zhancang's army. A number of Han Chinese officers were spotted wearing the green uniforms of Ma Zhancang's unit of the New 36th Division; presumably they had converted to Islam.

=== Battle of Urumqi ===
The division twice (First Battle of Urumqi and Second Battle of Urumqi) attempted to take the city of Urumqi, the second time, they were joined by a Han Chinese army under Zhang Peiyuan.

=== Battle of Tutung ===
In 1934, two brigades of Soviet Gosudarstvennoye Politicheskoye Upravlenie (GPU) troops of about 7,000 backed by tanks, planes, and artillery with mustard gas, attacked the division near Tutung. The battle raged for several weeks on the frozen Tutung river. New 36th Division troops, wearing sheepskins in the snow, charged Soviet machine-gun posts with swords to defeat a Soviet pincer attack. Soviet planes bombed the division with mustard gas. Heavy casualties mounted on both sides before Ma Zhongying ordered the division to withdraw.

=== Battle of Dawan Cheng ===
Ma Zhongying encountered a Soviet armored car column of a few hundred soldiers near Dawan Cheng. The New 36th Division wiped out nearly the entire column, after engaging the Soviet in savage hand-to-hand fighting, and rolled the wrecked Soviet armored cars off the mountainsides. When a White Russian force showed up, Ma Zhongying withdrew.

=== Battle of Kashgar (1934) ===
New 36th Division General Ma Fuyuan stormed Kashgar, and attacked the Uighur and Kirghiz rebels of the First East Turkestan Republic. He freed another New 36th Division general, Ma Zhancang, who had been trapped by the Uighurs and Kirghiz. Ma Zhancang repulsed six Uighur attacks, inflicting massive casualties on the Uighur forces. 2,000 to 8,000 Uighur civilians were killed in revenge for the Kizil massacre. General Ma Zhongying gave a speech at Idgah mosque, reminding the Uighurs to be loyal to the Republic of China government at Nanjing. Several citizens at the British consulate were killed by the division.

=== Battle of Yangi Hissar ===
Ma Zhancang led the division in an attack on Uyghur forces at Yangi Hissar, wiping out the entire Uighur force, and killing Emir Nur Ahmad Jan Bughra.

=== Battle of Yarkand ===
Ma Zhancang defeated the Uighur and Afghan volunteers sent by King Mohammed Zahir Shah, and exterminated them all. The emir Abdullah Bughra was killed and beheaded, his head put on display at Idgah mosque.

=== Charkhlik Revolt ===
The New 36th Division, under General Ma Hushan, crushed a revolt by the Uighurs at the Charkhlik oasis.

== Administration of Tunganistan ==
The division, under General Ma Hushan, administered the oases of southern Xinjiang, and their administration was dubbed Tunganistan by Western travelers. Ma Hushan and the New 36th Division declared their loyalty to the Kuomintang government in Nanjing and sent emissaries to Nanjing requesting aid to fight against Sheng Shicai's provincial forces and the Soviet Union.

The administration was colonial in nature; the Chinese Muslims started putting up street signs and names in Chinese, which used to be written only in the Uighur language. They also sought to live a Chinese lifestyle, importing Chinese cooks and baths. Islam barely played a role except as a "vague spiritual focus" for unified opposition against Sheng Shicai and the Soviet Union.

The Uyghurs of the Charklik oases revolted against the New 36th Division in 1935, but the Chinese Muslims crushed the insurgents, executed 100 people, and took the family of the Uyghur chief as hostages.

Camels were requisitioned by the division in Cherchen.

== Islamic rebellion of 1937 ==
In May 1937, the New 36th Division's acting commander, Ma Hushan, launched a military operation against Sheng Shicai, which involved laying siege to Kashgar, capturing Bachu, and taking the vanguard approaches to Aksu. Sheng Shicai requested assistance from the Soviets, and in September 1937 three Soviet regiments entered the country from Artush. They defeated Ma Hushan at Bachu, and moved to Kashgar and Yarkand. The 36th Division retreated to Hotan, and when the Soviet Red Army occupied Pishan in early September, Ma Hushan abandoned his troops and fled to India. Afterwards, the division disintegrated and ceased to exist.
