= Ma Zhancang =

Hui Chinese general

- Born: Gansu, China
- Died: 1937
- Military career
- Allegiance: China
- Service years: 1929–1937
- Rank: General
- Unit: New 36th Division
- Commands: General in the New 36th Division
- Conflicts: Kumul Rebellion: Battle of Kashgar (1933); Battle of Sekes Tash; Battle of Kashgar (1934); Battle of Yarkand; Battle of Yangi Hissar

Ma Zhancang (simplified Chinese: 马占仓; traditional Chinese: 馬占倉; pinyin: Mǎ Zhàncāng; Wade–Giles: Ma Chan-ts'ang, Xiao'erjing: ﻣَﺎ جً ﺿْﺎ; ? - 1937) was a Hui Chinese Muslim general of the New 36th Division of the National Revolutionary Army. He served under the generals Ma Zhongying and Ma Hushan. At the Battle of Kashgar (1933), he repulsed an attack by Uyghurs led by the Syrian Arab Tawfiq Bay, wounding Tawfiq. He fought and defeated the Uyghur and Kyrgyz rebels of the First East Turkestan Republic at the Battle of Kashgar, the Battle of Yarkand and the Battle of Yangi Hissar in 1934. He killed the Uyghur leaders Timur Beg, Abdullah Bughra and Nur Ahmad Jan Bughra.
