= Abdullah Bughra =

Uyghur emir (1901–1934)

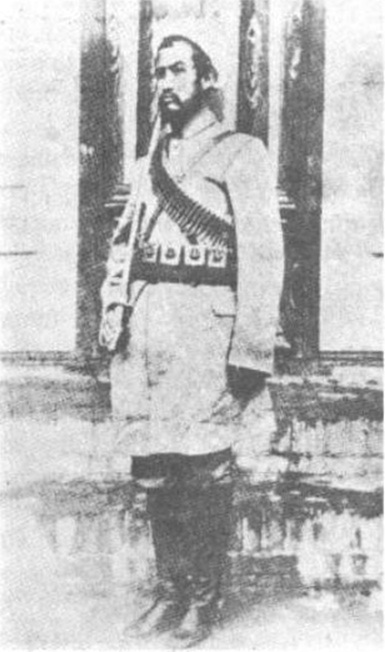
- Abdullah Bughra

Emir of the First East Turkestan Republic
- In office 1933 – April 1934

Personal details
- Born: After 1901 Khotan
- Died: April 16th, 1934 Yarkand
- Party: Young Kashgar Party and Committee for National Revolution
- Relations: Muhammad Amin Bughra, Nur Ahmad Jan Bughra

Abdullah Bughra (Uyghur: (Kona Yëziq) ئابدۇللا بۇغرا, عبد الله بغرا; Chinese: 阿不都拉·布格拉; pinyin: Ābùdūlā·Bùgélā; after 1901 - April 16, 1934) was a Uyghur emir of the First East Turkestan Republic. He was the younger brother of Muhammad Amin Bughra and older brother of Emir Nur Ahmad Jan Bughra. He commanded Uyghur and Kirghiz forces during the Battle of Kashgar (1934) against the Chinese Muslim 36th Division (National Revolutionary Army). The Chinese Muslims were loyal to the Chinese government and wanted to crush the Turkic Muslim Uyghurs and Kirghiz in revenge for the Kizil massacre. He also had Afghan bodyguards protecting him. He was killed in 1934 at Yarkand by Chinese Muslim troops under general Ma Zhancang. All of Abdullah's fighters were killed, but his body was never found, which later gave rise to speculations about his fate.

Several sources state that Abdullah's head was cut off after he was killed and sent to Id Kah Mosque to be put on display.
