= Ma Zhongying =

Chinese warlord

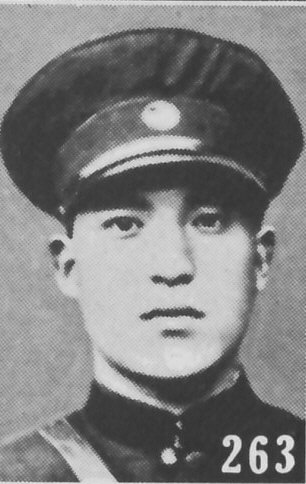
- Ma Zhongying as pictured in The Most Recent Biographies of Chinese Dignitaries
- Born: 馬仲英 1910; Linxia County, Gansu, Qing China
- Died: After 1936
- Military career
- Allegiance: Republic of China
- Service years: 1929–1934
- Rank: General
- Nickname: Ga Ssu-ling ("Baby General" or "Little Commander") or "Big Horse"
- Unit: New 36th Division
- Commands: Chief of the New 36th Division
- Conflicts: Central Plains War; Kumul Rebellion; First Battle of Urumqi (1933); Soviet Invasion of Xinjiang; Battle of Kashgar (1934); Battle of Khotan

Ma Zhongying
- Traditional Chinese: 馬仲英
- Simplified Chinese: 马仲英
Transcriptions
Standard Mandarin
- Hanyu Pinyin: Mǎ Zhòngyīng
- Wade–Giles: Ma3 Chung4-ying1
other Mandarin
- Xiao'erjing: مَا جٌ‌یِئٍ

Commander Ga
- Chinese: 尕司令
Transcriptions
Standard Mandarin
- Hanyu Pinyin: Gǎ sīlìng
- Wade–Giles: Ka3 ssu1-ling4

Ma Buying
- Traditional Chinese: 馬步英
- Simplified Chinese: 马步英
Transcriptions
Standard Mandarin
- Hanyu Pinyin: Mǎ Bùyīng
- Wade–Giles: Ma3 Pu4-ying1

Flag of Twelve Rays Sun in Blue Sky. It was used by Hui warlords who allied themselves with Kuomintang Nanjing and Chiang Kai-shek.

Ma Zhongying, also Ma Chung-ying (traditional Chinese: 馬仲英; simplified Chinese: 马仲英; pinyin: Mǎ Zhòngyīng; Wade–Giles: Ma Chung-ying, Xiao'erjing: مَا جٌ‌یِئٍ; c. 1910 or 1908 – after 1936), nickname Commander Ga (尕司令, lit. youngster commander), was a Chinese Muslim warlord during the Warlord era of China. His birth name was Ma Buying (馬步英; 马步英; Mǎ Bùyīng; Ma Pu-ying). Ma was a warlord of Gansu Province in China during the 1930s. His alliance with the Kuomintang (KMT) brought his predominantly Chinese Muslim troops under the control of the KMT as the New 36th Division (National Revolutionary Army) with Ma Zhongying as its commander. He was ordered to overthrow Jin Shuren, the governor of Xinjiang. After several victories over provincial and White Russian forces, he attempted to expand his territory into southern Xinjiang by launching campaigns from his power base in Gansu, but was stopped by Xinjiang warlord Sheng Shicai with Soviet support in 1934.

== Life ==
=== The rise of Ma Zhongying ===
Ma Zhongying joined a Muslim militia in 1924 when he was 14 years old. He was involved in the rebellion against Feng Yuxiang's Guominjun forces in Gansu, and even fought against his own relatives, including his great-uncle warlord Ma Lin, who had continued to serve the Guominjun. He also massacred Tibetans during the rebellion.

Ma Zhongying seized Hezhou and vanquished the forces of Ma Lin, who had been sent to recapture Hezhou from him. However, he was relieved by his commander—who was also his uncle—Ma Ku-chang, for acting without orders to take Hezhou. Ma Zhongying seized Gansu's capital (Lanzhou) from the Guominjun in April 1929 but was eventually defeated and expelled by them.

Hui Muslims belonging to the Xidaotang sect and Tibetans in Taozhou were attacked by Ma Zhongying and his own Hui Muslim soldiers, causing an exodus of panicked Xidaotang Hui Muslims.

During Ma Zhongying's 1928 revolt, a blaze destroyed the Multicolored Mosque. Ma revolted in a period of famine and heavy taxation and seized Hezhou after besieging it. While most local Hui did not participate in the revolt, they did provide supplies and food to his invading army consisting of many conscripted Salars. Zhao Xiping (赵席聘), commander of the 17th division of the National People's Army, under Feng Yuxiang (an ally of the Hezhou government), retaliated by burning the city, including its twelve mosques.

Ma attended the Whampoa Military Academy in Nanjing in 1929.

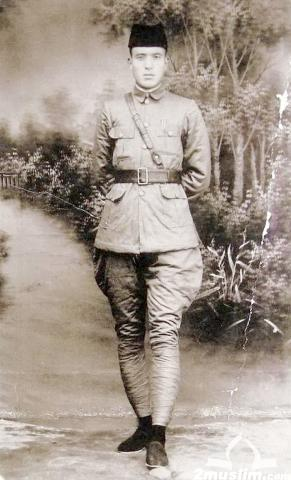
Gen. Ma Zhongying.

==== Xinjiang during the 1930s ====
"He was like the rider on the pale horse, which appeared when the fourth seal was broken: 'And I looked, and behold a pale horse: and his name that sat on him was death, and Hell followed with him. And power was given unto them over the fourth part of the earth, to kill with the sword, and with hunger and death, and with the beasts of the earth.'"
Sven Hedin on Ma Zhongying

Yulbars Khan asked for Ma Zhongying's help in overthrowing Gov. Jin Shuren after Jin abolished the Kumul Khanate and set off the Kumul Rebellion. Ma fought in Xinjiang for a while, was wounded and returned to Gansu where he forced Mildred Cable, Francesca and Eva French to tend to his wounds. He returned to Xinjiang in the summer of 1933.

Ma and the 36th Division fought the forces of Gov. Jin and the White Russians in the Kumul Rebellion. The KMT wanted Jin removed since he had signed without its approval an arms treaty with the Soviet Union.

During the siege of Hami, Ma sent W. Petro a European to get the garrison to surrender. The Garrison Commander inquired "Is it true that Ma Chong Yng is only twenty years old?" and W. Petro replied affirmatively. This made the garrison commander – an 81 year old man who had also placed his trust in a sorcerer – unwilling to surrender despite the urging of his staff and the miserable situation in the besieged city.

Ma's military actions were carried out by Hui officers and included atrocities toward Han and Uyghur civilians in Xinjiang during the fighting. Also, local Han and Uyghur were conscripted in his forces and sent to the front lines where they were subjected to heavy enemy cannon fire. The Soviets and Sheng Shicai claimed that Ma was being supported by the Japanese and using captured Japanese officers serving with his army. Despite this, Ma officially proclaimed his allegiance to the Chinese government in Nanjing.

Due to his severe abuse and brutality, the Turkis (Uyghurs) and Han Chinese hated the Hui officer Ma Zhongying had placed in charge of Barkul, Western traveller Peter Fleming reported that in 1935 Xinjiang was the only Chinese territory where Japanese agents were not active.

After originally fighting against Ma Zhongying, Han Chinese Gen. Zhang Peiyuan and his Han Ili army defected to Ma Zhongying's side to fight against the provincial government and the Russians. Ma Zhongying then fought against the Russians in the Soviet invasion of Xinjiang.

=== Downfall ===
Sven Hedin's truck caravan encountered Ma's forces while he and his New 36th Division were retreating south from the Soviet Invasion of Xinjiang. While Hedin was detained by Ma, he met Gen. Ma Hushan and Kemal Kaya Effendi. Ma's adjutant claimed to Hedin that Ma had the entire region of Tien-shan-nan-lu (southern Xinjiang) under his control and Hedin could pass through safely without any trouble. Hedin did not believe this assertion. Some of Ma's Tungan (Chinese-speaking Muslim) troops attacked Hedin's expedition by shooting at their vehicles.

In April 1934, after his forces had stormed Kashgar during the Battle of Kashgar (1934), Ma Zhongying himself arrived in the city and gave a speech at Id Kah Mosque, telling the Uyghurs to be loyal to the Chinese Kuomintang government at Nanjing.

"Ma denounced Sheng Shicai as a Soviet puppet, and reaffirmed his allegiance to the Chinese government of Nanjing".

During the Soviet invasion of Xinjiang Ma Zhongying played a major role in fighting the invaders but his troops had to withdraw again and again. The last defense line was set up around Khotan, from where he was generally believed to have fled to Soviet territory and was not seen again in Xinjiang.

=== Aftermath ===
Vladimir Petrov, a Soviet NKVD agent posted in Yarkand in 1937, gives a different version of Ma Zhongying's disappearance. In his memoir Empire of Fear, published in 1956 after defection to the West, Petrov describes how Ma was lured from Khotan onto a plane he believed was a Kuomintang flight, but was in fact staffed by Soviet agents who abducted him first to Yarkand NKVD headquarters, where he was forced to issue false orders to his own remnant troops in Khotan that would lead to their defeat, then flown on to Moscow where his fate was not known. There was no voluntary flight to the Soviet Union.

The book "Who's Who in China" erroneously claimed that Ma Zhongying came back from the Soviet Union in 1934 to Tianjin, China, and was residing there that year.

British telegrams from India in 1937 said that Tungans like Ma Zhongying and Ma Hushan had reached an agreement with the Soviets, whom they had fought before, that since the Japanese had begun full-scale warfare with China, the Tungans, led by Ma Zhongying and Ma Hushan, would help Chinese forces battle Japan, and that Ma Zhongying and Ma Hushan would return to Gansu, Ma Zhongying being sent back to Gansu by the Soviets, who had been keeping him in Russia.

In 1936 Zhang Guotao's forces crossed the Yellow River in an attempt to expand the Communist base into Xinjiang and make a direct connection with the USSR. Some sources allege that Ma Zhongying enlisted in the Red Army and became a high-ranking special adviser to the proposed Soviet force that was planning to take action, according to Zhang Guotao's forces. Ma Zhongying's tasks were, reportedly, to advise the Soviets on the situation in Xinjiang and to help them negotiate with his cousins Ma Bufang, Ma Hongbin and their families so that these warlords would not hinder Zhang Guotao's forces. However, the Soviet plan did not materialize because Zhang Guotao's communist force was met by a coalition of 100,000 troops assembled by Chiang Kai-Shek from the forces of Ma Bufang's Kuomintang Army from Qinghai, a remnant of Ma Zhongying's forces from Gansu and Ma Hongkui and Ma Hongbin troops from Ningxia. The combined force annihilated Guotao's army. Guotao's own 21,000-man Fourth Red Army collapsed first, followed by Mao Zedong's 8,000-man First Red Army.

Sheng Shicai sent requests to the Soviets to turn him in, but they refused.

Nothing more was heard from Ma Zhongying after 1936. There are at least five stories of Ma's end:

- Ma was killed in a crash prior to World War II.
- Ma was executed after being taken to Moscow in 1936.
- Ma was imprisoned at a labor camp and later executed during the Great Purge of the Army in 1937–1938.
- Some writers, such as Red Army Gen. Konstantin Rokossovsky, allege that Ma was first arrested during the Great Purge but was later released and participated in the Great Patriotic War.
- According to Sheng Shicai's memoir, Sinkiang: Pawn or Pivot? (Michigan University Press, 1958) Ma, together with all his staff, was executed in Moscow on orders of Joseph Stalin during the summer or spring of 1937.

== Personal character ==
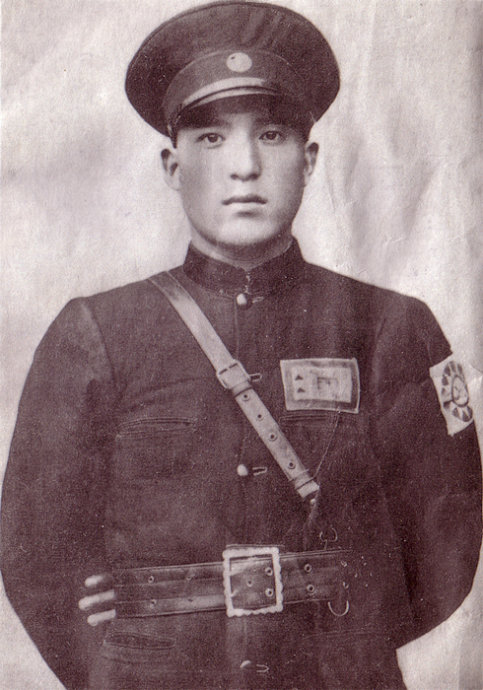
Gen. Ma Zhongying, KMT 36th Division Chief. He is wearing a Kuomintang armband like many of his troops did.

Ma used the KMT Blue Sky with a White Sun banners and armbands in his military actions. He himself wore a KMT armband and a New 36th Division uniform to show that he was a legitimate representative of the Chinese government. His troops sang Chinese Muslim marching songs. He himself had a harmonium (pump organ) with him, and spent hours playing Muslim hymns on it. He carried Mauser pistols and liked to quote as his models Genghis Khan, Napoleon, Hindenburg and Zuo Zongtang.

Ma Zhongying had very high ambitions. According to Sven Hedin he dreamt, at times, of creating an empire which would include the whole of Soviet, (as well as Chinese), Central Asia:

"We heard from Chinese, Tungans and Turkis alike that Ma Chung-yin’s plans were gigantic. His ambition did not go so far as to seek equality with Genghis Khan, but he was not content with anything below a level with Tamerlane. Timur the Lame had dominated the whole of Western Asia, and at the time of his death he had just begun a campaign against the Emperor of China, Yung Lo. He had spies and agents all over Eastern Turkestan and as far as Suchow by way of Tun-hwang. His successor in our time, Ma Chung-yin, was first to conquer the whole of Sinkiang and Kansu, and then unite with his kingdom the whole of Russian Turkestan as far as the Caspian Sea and the frontier of Iran. He was himself a Mohammedan, and his aim was to bring the whole of the Turki world in Central Asia under his sceptre. He would become Sultan in Turan, just as Riza Shah in Teheran was King of Iran."

Rewi Alley wrote on Ma Zhongying that "[h]e was a silly boy. He went mad. He murdered everyone."

A Hui soldier from the New 36th Division called Swedish explorer Sven Hedin a "foreign devil". During the 1930s, a White Russian driver for Nazi German agent Georg Vasel in Xinjiang was afraid to meet Hui general Ma Zhongying, saying: "You know how the Tungans hate the Russians." Vasel passed the Russian driver off as a German.

== Literature ==
- Mark Dickens: The Soviets in Xinjiang (1911–1949), (without place) 1990.
- Allen Whiting/Sheng Shih- Ts'ai: Sinkiang: Pawn or Pivot?, East Lansing (MA): Michigan State University Press 1958.
