= Soviet Armed Forces =

Military forces of Soviet Russia and the Soviet Union (1918–1991)

Armed Forces of the Union of Soviet Socialist Republics
- Вооружённые Силы Союза Советских Социалистических Республик

- The Soviet flag was also used as the Banner of the USSR Armed Forces
- Founded: 23 February 1918; 108 years ago (as the Red Army); 25 February 1946; 80 years ago (as the Soviet Armed Forces)
- Disbanded: 26 December 1991; 34 years ago (Soviet Union dissolved); 24 December 1993; 32 years ago (United Armed Forces disbanded)
- Service branches: Soviet Army; Soviet Air Forces; Soviet Air Defence Forces; Soviet Airborne Forces; Strategic Rocket Forces; Soviet Navy
- Headquarters: Ministry of Defence, Khamovniki District, Moscow, RSFSR

Leadership
- General Secretary: Joseph Stalin (1922–19??); Mikhail Gorbachev (1985–1991)
- Minister of Defence: Nikolai Podvoisky (1917–1918); Yevgeny Shaposhnikov (1991–1993)
- Chief of the General Staff: Pavel Lebedev (1921–1924); Viktor Samsonov (1991–1992)

Personnel
- Military age: 18–35
- Conscription: 2 years (Army & Air Force); 3 years (Navy)
- Active personnel: 4,900,000 (1985)
- Reserve personnel: 12,750,000

Expenditure
- Budget: US$128 billion (official, 1988); US$200-300 billion (CIA, Pentagon estimate, 1988)
- Percent of GDP: 4.9% (official, 1988); 7.7–11.5% (CIA, Pentagon estimate, 1988)

Related articles
- History: Military history of the Soviet Union
- Ranks: Military ranks of the Soviet Union

The Armed Forces of the Union of Soviet Socialist Republics, (Note: Russian: Вооружённые Силы Союза Советских Социалистических Республик, romanized: Vooruzhonnyye Sily Soyuza Sovetskikh Sotsialisticheskikh Respublik) also known as the Soviet Armed Forces, (Note: Russian: Вооружённые Силы Советского Союза, romanized: Vooruzhyonnyye Sily Sovetskogo Soyuza) were the armed forces of the Russian SFSR (1917–1922) and the Soviet Union (1922–1991) from their beginnings in the Russian Civil War to the collapse of the Soviet Union in 1991. In May 1992, Russian president Boris Yeltsin issued decrees forming the Russian Armed Forces, which subsumed much of the Soviet Armed Forces. Multiple sections of the former Soviet Armed Forces in the other, smaller Soviet republics gradually came under those republics' control.

According to the all-union military service law of September 1934, the Soviet Armed Forces consisted of the Red Army, the Air Forces, the Navy, the troops of the Joint State Political Directorate (OGPU), and the convoy guards of the union-republic NKVDs (on 30 October 1925, the convoy guards of the union-republic NKVDs were united into the Convoy Guard under the Council of People's Commissars of the Soviet Union). The OGPU was later corporated into the newly created NKVD of the USSR in 1934, and thus its Border and Internal Troops were under the joint management of the People's Commissariats of Defense and of Internal Affairs (in 1934, the Convoy Guard Troops were included in the Internal Troops). In 1989, the Soviet Armed Forces consisted of the Strategic Rocket Forces, the Ground Forces, the Air Defence Forces, the Air Forces, and the Navy, listed in their official order of importance.

In the Soviet Union, general conscription applied, which meant that all able-bodied males aged eighteen and older were drafted into the armed forces. International observers regarded the armed organizations as collectively one of the strongest such forces in world history. The relative advancement and development of the government's militaries was a key part of the history of the Soviet Union.

The Soviets maintained a notable reach across the world and particularly inside Europe. Russian and Soviet armies were always massive. By the 1980s they were "highly modernized, well-equipped, and have great firepower... [as well as] mobility", which meant that "manpower and mango combined [made] the present Soviet ground forces a very formidable land army. The ground forces were always the largest of the six Soviet military services.

== Names ==
- Russian: Вооружённые Силы Союза Советских Социалистических Республик, Vooruzhonnyye Sily Soyuza Sovetskikh Sotsialisticheskikh Respublik
- Ukrainian: Збройні Сили Союзу Радянських Соціалістичних Республік, Zbroyni Syly Soyuzu Radyansʹkykh Sotsialistychnykh Respublik
- Belarusian: Узброеныя Сілы Саюза Савецкіх Сацыялістычных Рэспублік, Uzbrojenyja Sily Sajuza Savieckich Sacyjalistyčnych Respublik
- Uzbek: Совет Социалистик Республикалари Иттифоқининг қуролли кучлари, Sovet Sotsialistik Respublikalari Ittifoqining qurolli kuchlari
- Kazakh: Кеңестік Социалистік Республикалар Одағы Қарулы Күштері, Keńestik Socıalistik Respýblıkalar Odaǵy Qarýly Kúshteri
- Georgian: საბჭოთა სოციალისტური რესპუბლიკების კავშირის შეიარაღებული ძალები, Sabch’ota Sotsialist’uri Resp’ublik’ebis K’avshiris Sheiaraghebuli Dzalebi
- Azerbaijani: Совет Сосиалист Республикалары Иттифагынын Силаһлы Гүввәләри, Sovet Sosialist Respublikaları İttifaqının Silahlı Qüvvələri
- Lithuanian: Tarybų Socialistinių Respublikų Sąjungos Ginkluotosios Pajėgos
- Romanian (called "Moldavian" in the USSR; also known as Moldovan language): Форцеле армате але Униуна Републичилори Сочиалисть Советичь, Forțele armate ale Uniuna Republicilori Socialisti Sovietici
- Latvian: Padomju Sociālistisko Republiku Savienības Bruņotie Spēki
- Kyrgyz: Советтик Социалисттик Республикалар Союзу Куралдуу Күчтөрү, Sovettik Sotsialisttik Respublikalar Soyuzu Kuralduu Küçtörü
- Tajik: Қувваҳои Мусаллаҳи Иттиҳоди Ҷумҳуриҳои Шӯравии Сосиалистӣ, Quvvahoji Musallahi Ittihodi Çumhurihoji Şūraviji Sosialistī
- Armenian: Սովետական սոցիալիստական հանրապետությունների միության զինված ուժեր, Sovetakan sots’ialistakan hanrapetut’yunneri miut’yan zinvats uzher
- Turkmen: Совет Сосиалистик Республикалары Союзы Яраглы Гүйчлери, Sowet Sosialistik Respublikalary Soýuzy Ýaragly Güýçleri
- Estonian: Nõukogude Sotsialistlike Vabariikide Liidu Relvajõud

== History ==
=== Origins ===
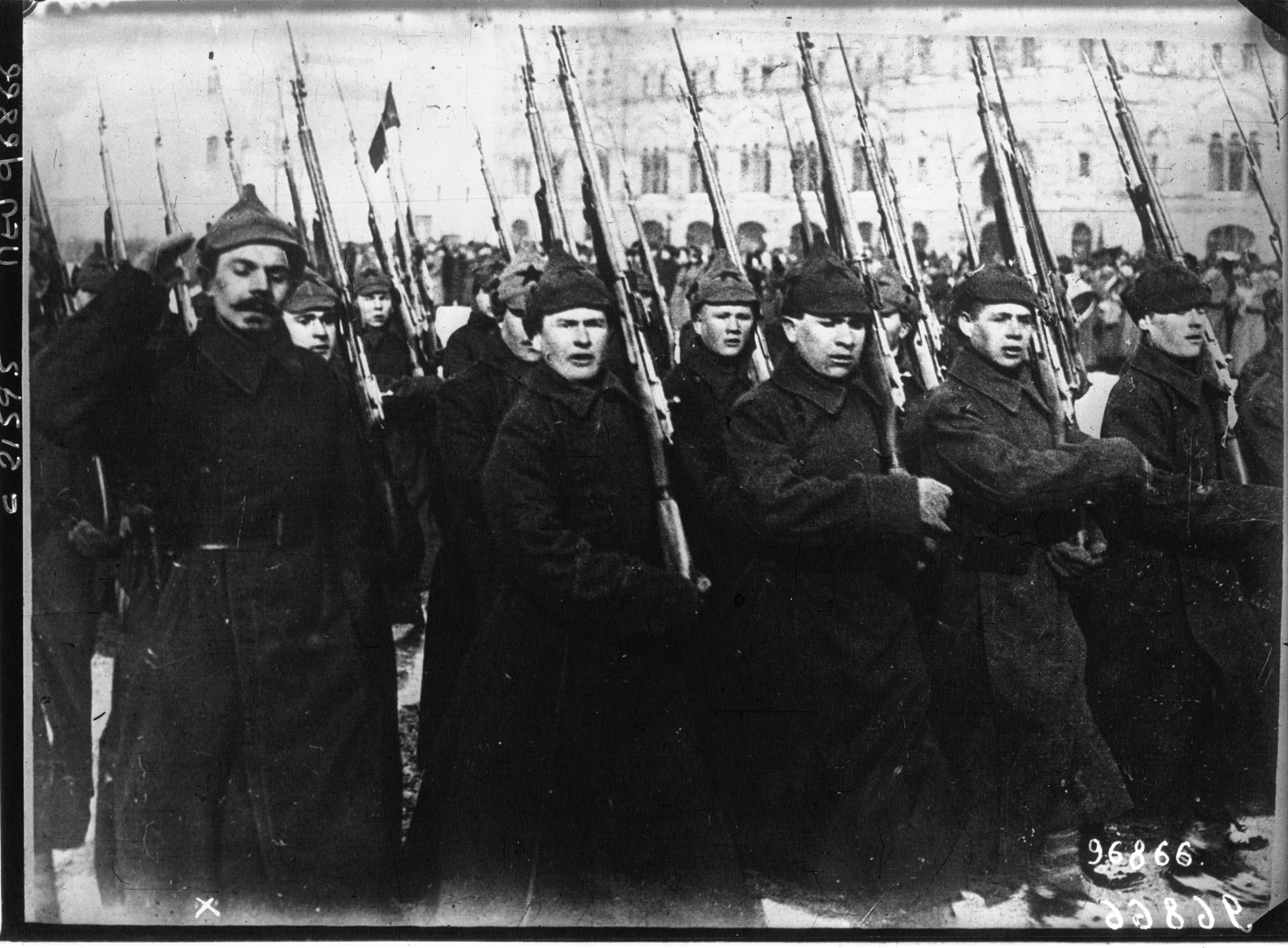
A Red Army parade in Moscow, 1922

The Council of People's Commissars set up the Red Army by decree on January 15, 1918 (Old Style) (January 28, 1918), basing it on the already-existing Red Guard. The official Red Army Day of February 23, 1918, marked the day of the first mass draft of the Red Army in Petrograd and Moscow and the first combat action against the rapidly advancing Imperial German Army. February 23 became an important national holiday in the Soviet Union, later celebrated as "Soviet Army Day", and it continues as a celebration day in present-day Russia as Defenders of the Motherland Day. Credit as the founder of the Red Army generally goes to Leon Trotsky, the People's Commissar for War from 1918 to 1924.

At the beginning of its existence, the Red Army functioned as a voluntary formation, without ranks or insignia. Democratic elections selected the officers. However, a decree of May 29, 1918, imposed obligatory military service for men of ages 18 to 40. To service the massive draft, the Bolsheviks formed regional Military commissariats (voenkomats), which still carry out this function in Russia. They should not be confused with military political commissars. Democratic election of officers was also abolished by decree, while separate quarters for officers, special forms of address, saluting, and higher pay were all reinstated.

After General Aleksei Brusilov offered the Bolsheviks his professional services in 1920, they decided to permit the conscription of former officers of the Imperial Russian Army. The Bolshevik authorities set up a special commission under the chair of Lev Glezarov (Лев Маркович Глезаров), and by August 1920 had drafted about 315,000 ex-officers. Most often they held the position of military advisor (voyenspets: "военспец" an abbreviation of "военный специалист", i.e., "military specialist"). A number of prominent Red Army commanders had previously served as Imperial Russian generals. In fact, a number of former Imperial military men, notably a member of the Supreme Military Council, Mikhail Bonch-Bruevich, had joined the Bolsheviks earlier.

The Bolshevik authorities assigned to every unit of the Red Army a political commissar, or politruk, who had the authority to override unit commanders' decisions if they ran counter to the principles of the Communist Party of the Soviet Union. Although this sometimes resulted in inefficient command, the Party leadership considered political control over the military necessary, as the Army relied more and more on experienced officers from the pre-revolutionary Tsarist period.

=== Polish–Soviet War ===
The Polish–Soviet War represented the first foreign campaign of the Red Army. The Soviet counter-offensive following the 1920 Polish invasion of Ukraine at first met with success, but Polish forces halted it at the disastrous (for the Soviets) Battle of Warsaw (1920).

=== Far East ===
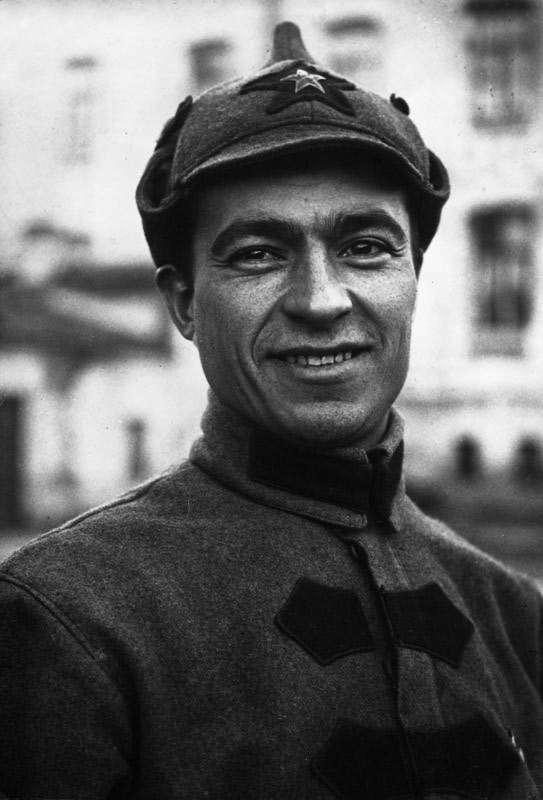
A soldier of the Red Army, 1926, wearing the budenovka

In 1934, Mongolia and the USSR, recognising the threat from the mounting Japanese military presence in Manchuria and Inner Mongolia, agreed to co-operate in the field of defence. On March 12, 1936, the co-operation increased with the ten-year Mongolian-Soviet Treaty of Friendship, which included a mutual defence protocol.

In May 1939, a Mongolian cavalry unit clashed with Manchukuoan cavalry in the disputed territory east of the Halha River (also known in Russian as Халхин-Гол, Halhin Gol). There followed a clash with a Japanese detachment, which drove the Mongolians over the river. The Soviet troops quartered there in accordance with the mutual defence protocol intervened and obliterated the detachment. Escalation of the conflict appeared imminent, and both sides spent June amassing forces. On July 1 the Japanese force numbered 38,000 troops. The combined Soviet-Mongol force had 12,500 troops. The Japanese crossed the river, but after a three-day battle their opponents threw them back over the river. The Japanese kept probing the Soviet defences throughout July, without success.

On August 20 Georgy Zhukov opened a major offensive with heavy air attack and three hours of artillery bombardment, after which three infantry divisions and five armoured brigades, supported by a fighter regiment and masses of artillery (57,000 troops in total), stormed the 75,000 Japanese force deeply entrenched in the area. On August 23 the entire Japanese force found itself encircled, and on August 31 largely destroyed. Artillery and air attacks wiped out those Japanese who refused to surrender. Japan requested a cease-fire, and the conflict concluded with an agreement between the USSR, Mongolia and Japan signed on September 15 in Moscow. In the conflict, the Red Army losses were 9,703 killed in action (KIA) and missing in action (MIA) and 15,952 wounded. The Japanese lost 25,000 KIA; the grand total was 61,000 killed, missing, wounded and taken prisoner.

Shortly after the cease-fire, the Japanese negotiated access to the battlefields to collect their dead. Finding thousands upon thousands of dead bodies came as a further shock to the already shaken morale of the Japanese soldiers. The scale of the defeat probably became a major factor in discouraging a Japanese attack on the USSR during World War II, which allowed the Red Army to switch a large number of its Far Eastern troops into the European Theatre in the desperate autumn of 1941.

=== Second World War ===
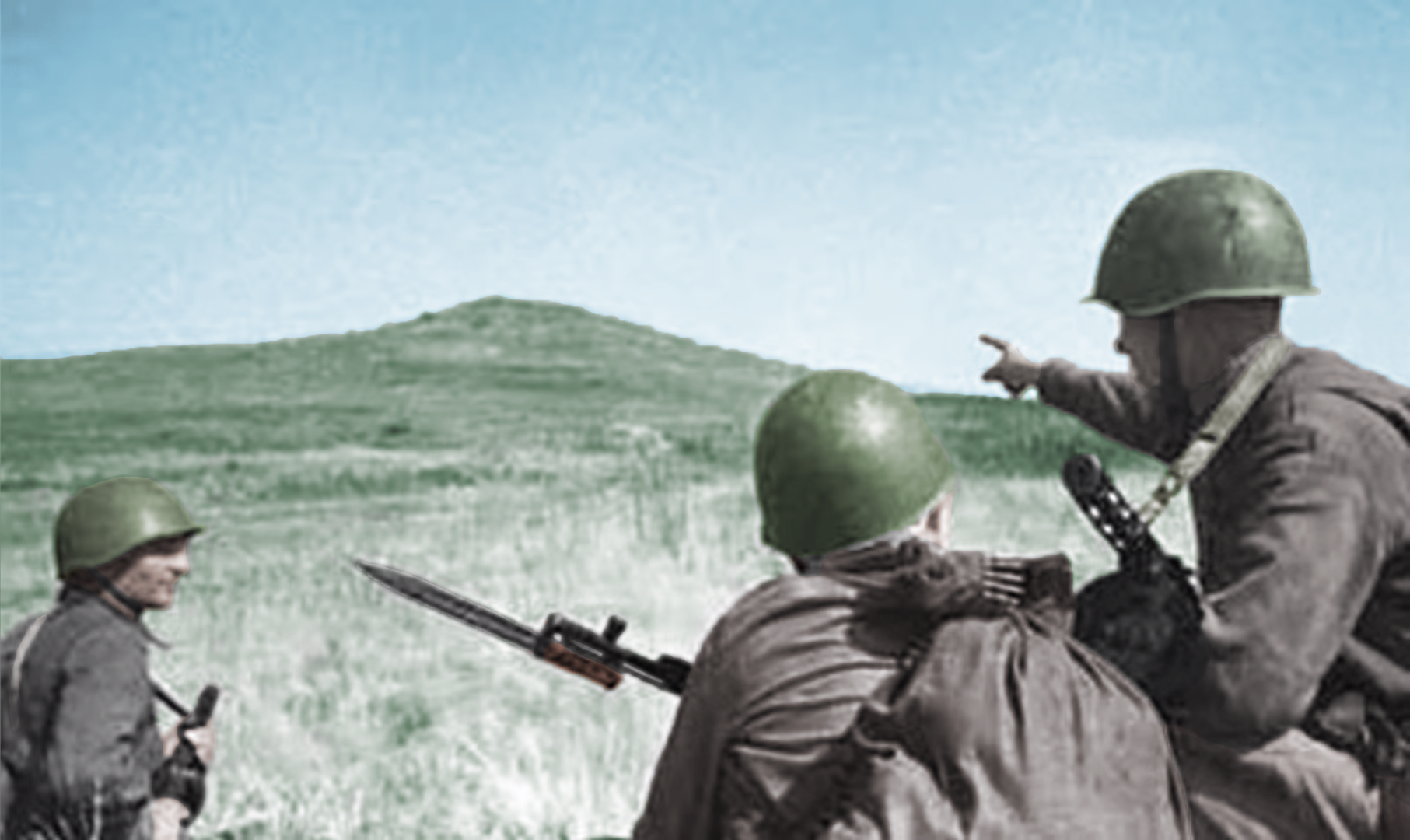
A colorized photo of Red Army soldiers during World War II

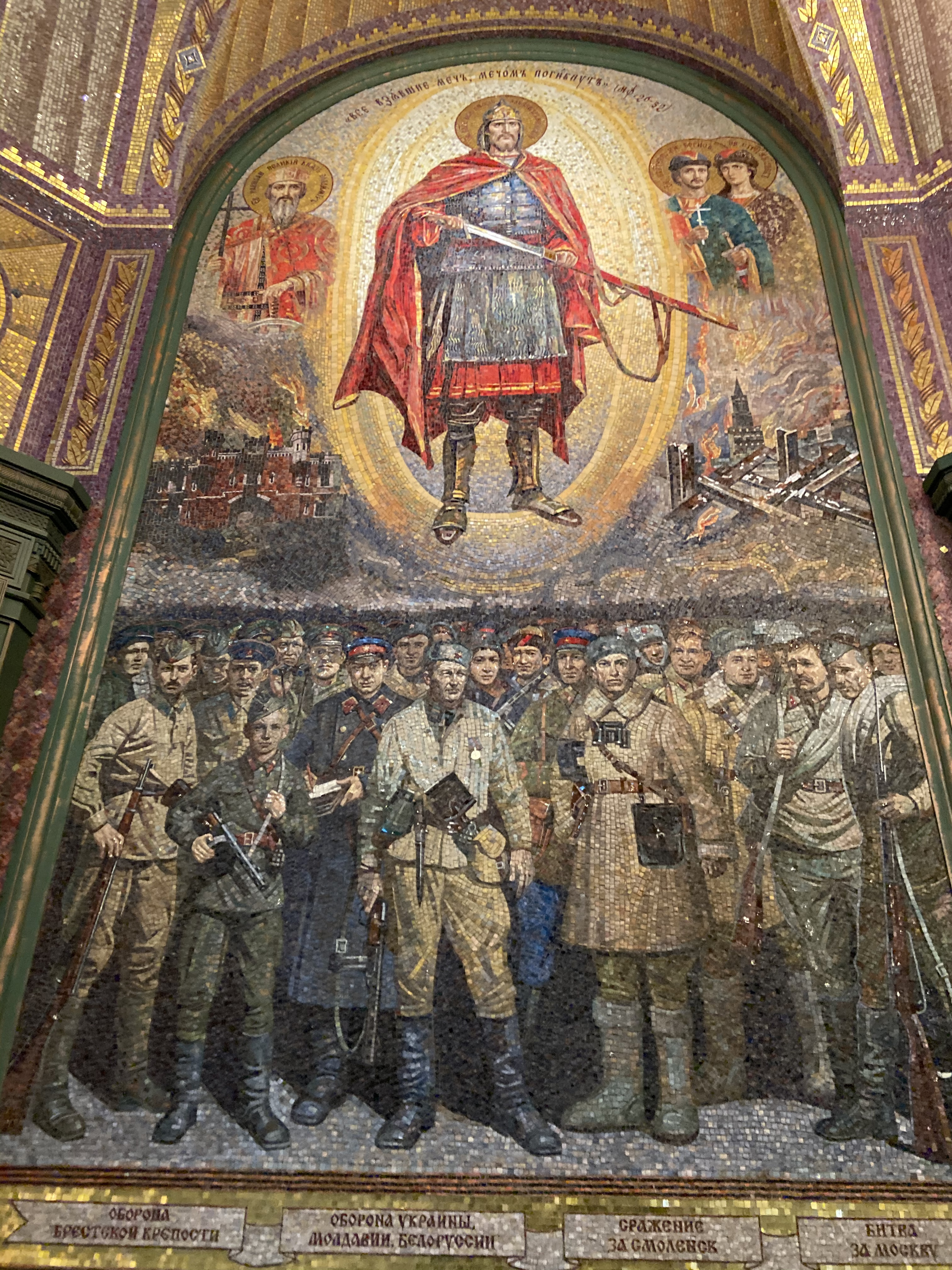
A mosaic in the Main Cathedral of the Russian Armed Forces commemorating the Soviet Armed Forces and some of its most important World War II battles – Defense of Brest Fortress, Battle of Smolensk and Battle of Moscow

==== The Polish Campaign ====
On September 17, 1939, the Red Army marched its troops into the eastern territories of Poland (now part of Belarus and Ukraine), using the official pretext of coming to the aid of the Ukrainians and the Belarusians threatened by Germany, which had attacked Poland on September 1, 1939. The Soviet invasion opened a second front for the Poles and forced them to abandon plans for defence in the Romanian bridgehead area, thus hastening the Polish defeat. The Soviet and German advance halted roughly at the Curzon Line.

The Molotov–Ribbentrop Pact, which had included a secret protocol delimiting the "spheres of interest" of each party, set the scene for the remarkably smooth partition of Poland between Germany and the USSR. The defined Soviet sphere of interest matched the territory subsequently captured in the campaign. The Soviet and German troops met each other on a number of occasions. Most remarkably, on 22 September 1939, the German XIX Panzer Corps had occupied Brest-Litovsk, which lay within the Soviet sphere of interest. When the Soviet 29th Tank Brigade approached Brest-Litovsk, the commanders negotiated a German withdrawal, and a joint parade was held. Just three days earlier, however, the parties had a more damaging encounter near Lviv, when the German 137th Gebirgsjägerregimenter (mountain infantry regiment) attacked a Soviet reconnaissance detachment.; After a few casualties on both sides, the parties negotiated, the German troops left the area, and the Red Army troops entered L'viv on 22 September.

According to post-1991 Russian sources, the Red Army force in Poland numbered 466,516. The Red Army troops faced little resistance, mainly due to the entanglement of the majority of the Polish forces in fighting Germans along the Western border, but partly due to an official order by the Polish Supreme Command not to engage in combat with the Soviet troops, and also partly because many Polish citizens in the Kresy region—Ukrainians and Belarusians—viewed the advancing troops as liberators. Organization of Ukrainian Nationalists rose against the Poles, and communist partisans organised local revolts, e.g. in Skidel, robbing and murdering Poles. Nonetheless, the Red Army sustained losses of 1,475 killed and missing and 2,383 wounded. The losses of the opposing Polish troops are estimated at 6,000–7,000.

==== The Finnish campaigns ====
The Winter War began when the Soviet Union attacked Finland on 30 November 1939, two months after the invasion of Poland by Germany that started World War II. Because the attack was judged as illegal, the Soviet Union was expelled from the League of Nations on 14 December. The war ended on 13 March 1940.

The Continuation War was the second of two wars fought between Finland and the Soviet Union during World War II. On 25 June 1941 the Soviet Union conducted an air raid on Finnish cities, prompting Finland to declare war and to allow German troops stationed in Finland to begin an offensive. By September 1941, Finland had regained its post–Winter War concessions to the Soviet Union: the Karelian Isthmus and Ladoga Karelia. However, the Finnish Army continued the offensive past the 1939 border during the conquest of East Karelia, including Petrozavodsk, and halted only around 30–32 km (19–20 mi) from the centre of Leningrad. It participated in besieging the city by cutting the northern supply routes and by digging in until 1944.

In Lapland, joint German-Finnish forces failed to capture Murmansk or to cut the Kirov (Murmansk) Railway, a transit route for Soviet lend-lease equipment. The conflict stabilised with only minor skirmishes until the tide of the war turned against the Germans and the Soviet strategic Vyborg–Petrozavodsk Offensive occurred in June 1944. The attack drove the Finns from most of the territories that they had gained during the war, but the Finnish Army halted the offensive in August 1944. Hostilities between Finland and the USSR ended with a ceasefire, which was called on 5 September 1944, formalised by the signing of the Moscow Armistice on 19 September 1944.

==== Barbarossa, 1941–1945 (Great Patriotic War) ====
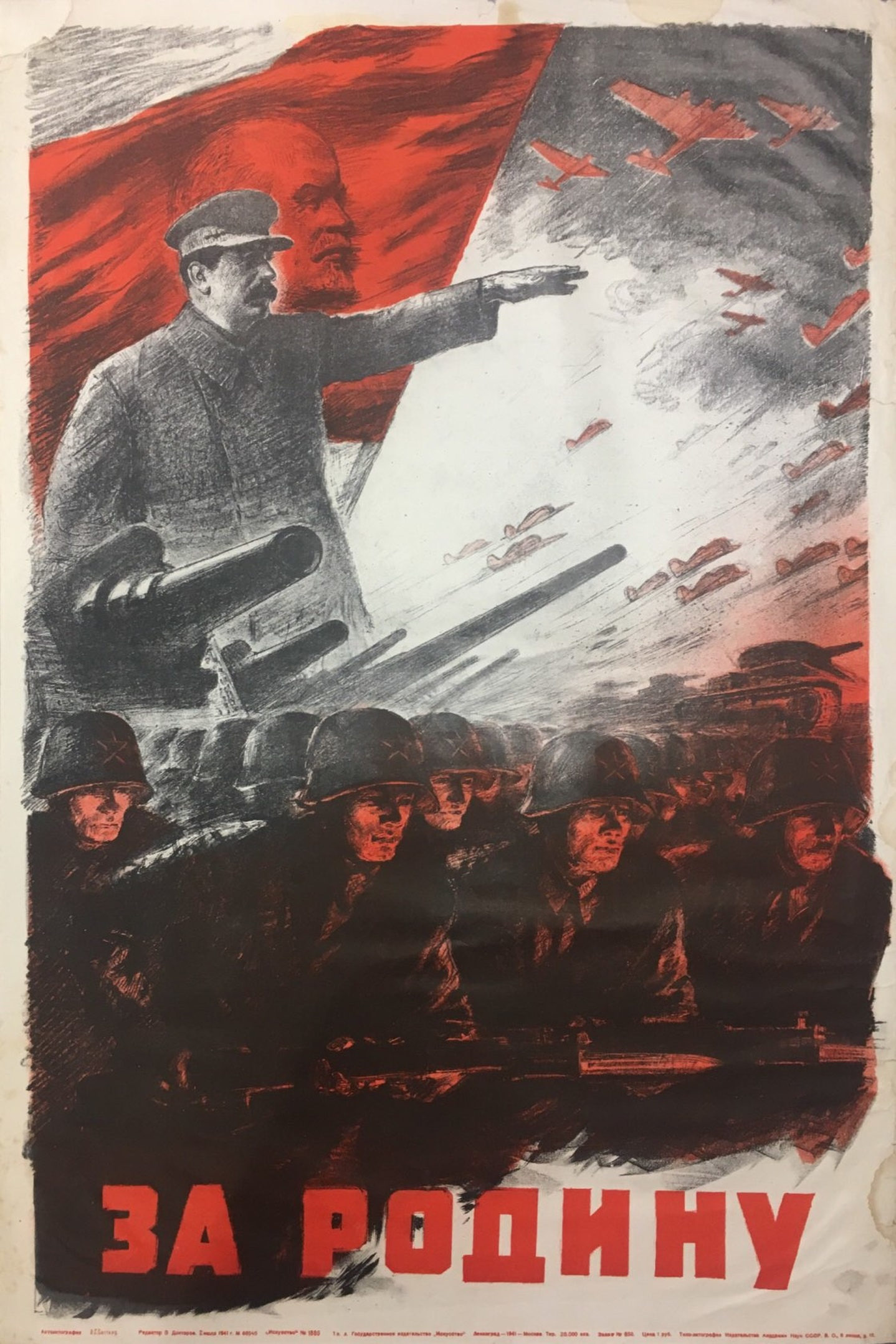
Soviet war poster, 1941

By the autumn of 1940, Nazi Germany and its allies dominated most of the European continent. Only the United Kingdom (in the West) was actively challenging national socialist and fascist hegemony. Nazi Germany and Britain had no common land border, but a state of war existed between them; the Germans had an extensive land border with the Soviet Union, but the latter remained neutral, adhering to a non-aggression pact and by numerous trade agreements.

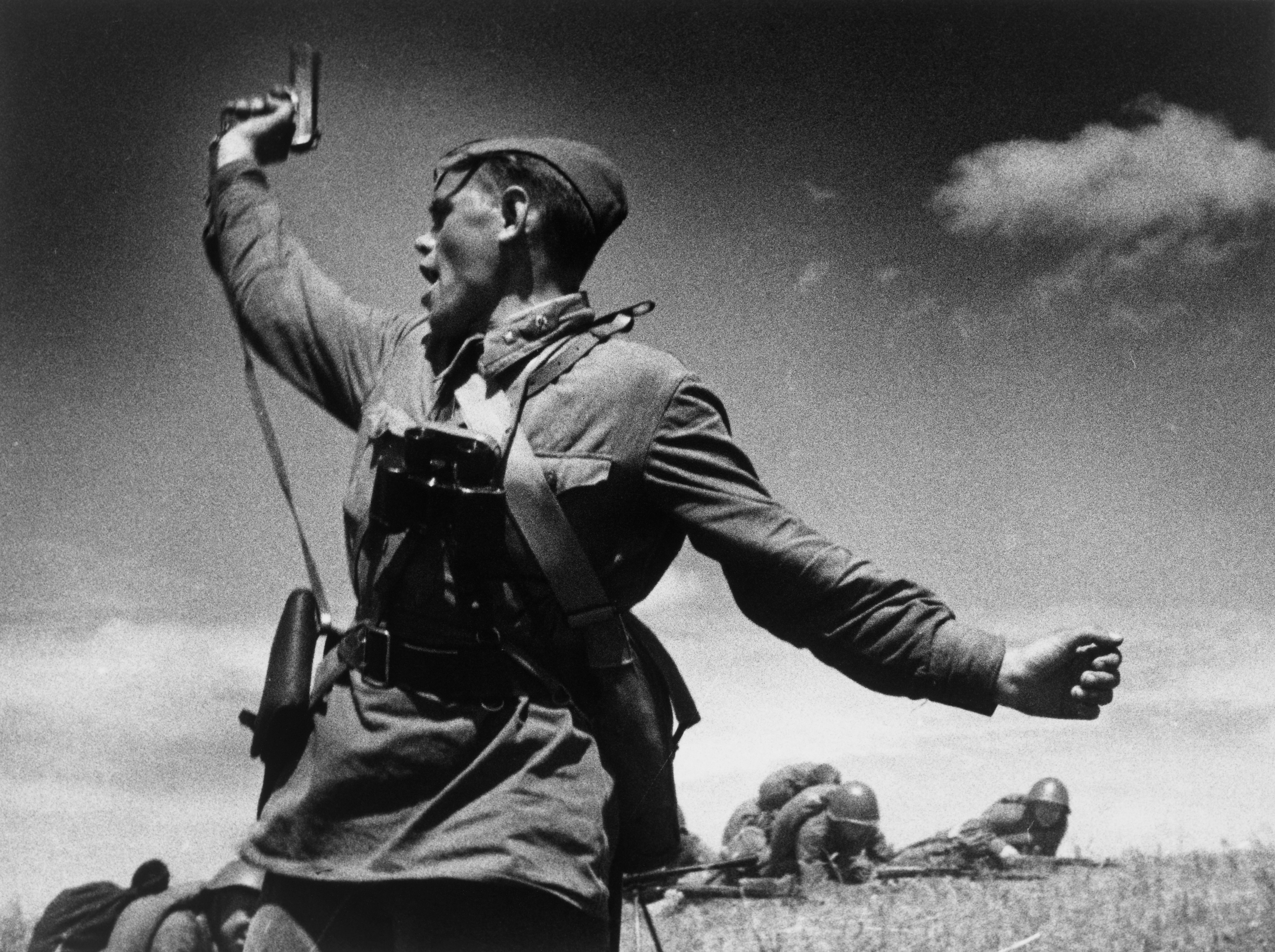
A Soviet junior political commissar (Politruk) urges Soviet troops forward against German positions (12 July 1942)

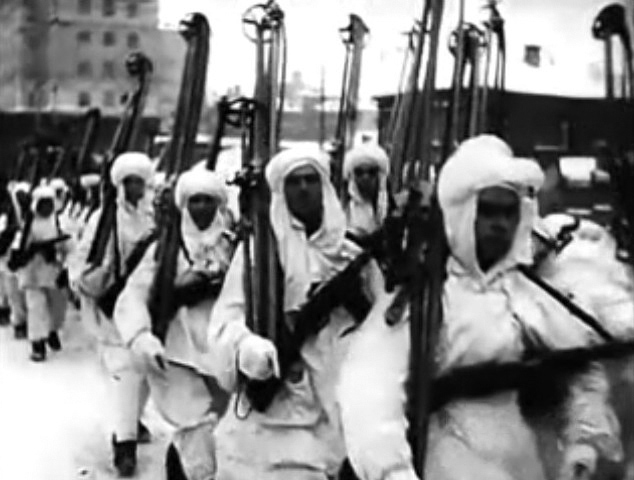
Soviet ski troops during World War II

For Adolf Hitler, no dilemma ever existed in this situation. Drang nach Osten (German for "Drive towards the East") remained the order of the day. This culminated, on December 18, in the issuing of 'Directive No. 21 – Case Barbarossa', which opened by saying "the German Armed Forces must be prepared to crush Soviet Russia in a quick campaign before the end of the war against England". Even before the issuing of the directive, the German General Staff had developed detailed plans for a Soviet campaign. On February 3, 1941, the final plan of Operation Barbarossa gained approval, and the attack was scheduled for the middle of May, 1941. However, the events in Greece and Yugoslavia necessitated a delay—to the second half of June.

At the time of the Nazi assault on the Soviet Union in June 1941, the Red Army had 303 divisions and 22 brigades (4.8 million troops), including 166 divisions and 9 brigades (2.9 million troops) stationed in the western military districts. Their Axis opponents deployed on the Eastern Front 181 divisions and 18 brigades (3.8 million troops). The first weeks of the war saw the annihilation of virtually the entire Soviet Air Force on the ground, the loss of major equipment, tanks, artillery, and major Soviet defeats as German forces trapped hundreds of thousands of Red Army soldiers in vast pockets.

Soviet forces suffered heavy damage in the field as a result of poor levels of preparedness, which was primarily caused by a reluctant, half-hearted and ultimately belated decision by the Soviet Government and High Command to mobilize the army. Equally important was a general tactical superiority of the German army, which was conducting the kind of warfare that it had been combat-testing and fine-tuning for two years. The hasty pre-war growth and over-promotion of the Red Army cadres as well as the removal of experienced officers caused by the Purges offset the balance even more favourably for the Germans. Finally, the sheer numeric superiority of the Axis cannot be underestimated.

A generation of brilliant Soviet commanders (most notably Georgy Zhukov) learned from the defeats, and Soviet victories in the Battle of Moscow, at Stalingrad, Kursk and later in Operation Bagration proved decisive in what became known to the Soviets as the Great Patriotic War.

The Soviet government adopted a number of measures to improve the state and morale of the retreating Red Army in 1941. Soviet propaganda turned away from political notions of class struggle, and instead invoked the deeper-rooted patriotic feelings of the population, embracing Tsarist Russian history. Propagandists proclaimed the War against the German aggressors as the "Great Patriotic War", in allusion to the Patriotic War of 1812 against Napoleon. References to ancient Russian military heroes such as Alexander Nevski and Mikhail Kutuzov appeared. Repressions against the Russian Orthodox Church stopped, and priests revived the tradition of blessing arms before battle. The Communist Party abolished the institution of political commissars—although it soon restored them. The Red Army re-introduced military ranks and adopted many additional individual distinctions such as medals and orders. The concept of a Guard re-appeared: units which had shown exceptional heroism in combat gained the names of "Guards Regiment", "Guards Army", etc.

During the German–Soviet War, the Red Army drafted a staggering 29,574,900 in addition to the 4,826,907 in service at the beginning of the war. Of these it lost 6,329,600 KIA, 555,400 deaths by disease and 4,559,000 MIA (most captured). Of these 11,444,100, however, 939,700 re-joined the ranks in the subsequently re-took Soviet territory, and a further 1,836,000 returned from German captivity. Thus the grand total of losses amounted to 8,668,400. The majority of the losses were ethnic Russians (5,756,000), followed by ethnic Ukrainians (1,377,400). The German losses on the Eastern Front consisted of an estimated 3,604,800 KIA/MIA (most killed) and 3,576,300 captured (total 7,181,100).

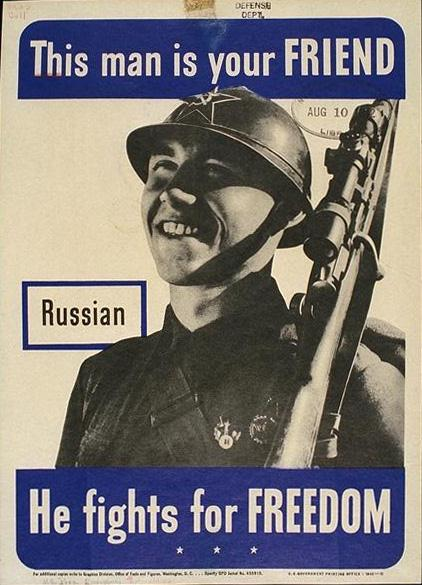
A U.S. government poster showing a friendly Soviet soldier as portrayed by the Allies during World War II

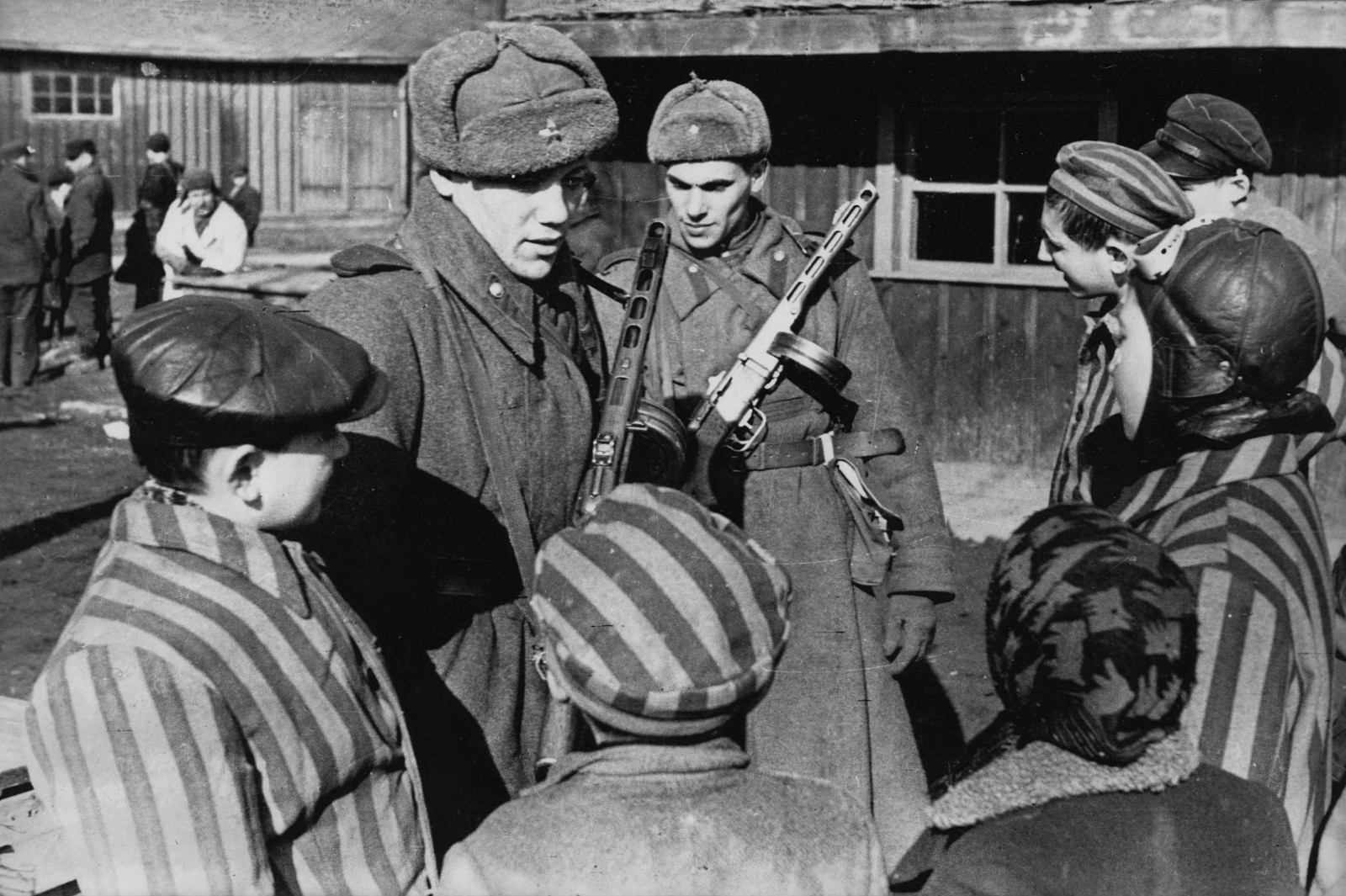
Liberation of the Auschwitz concentration camp by Red Army soldiers, January 1945

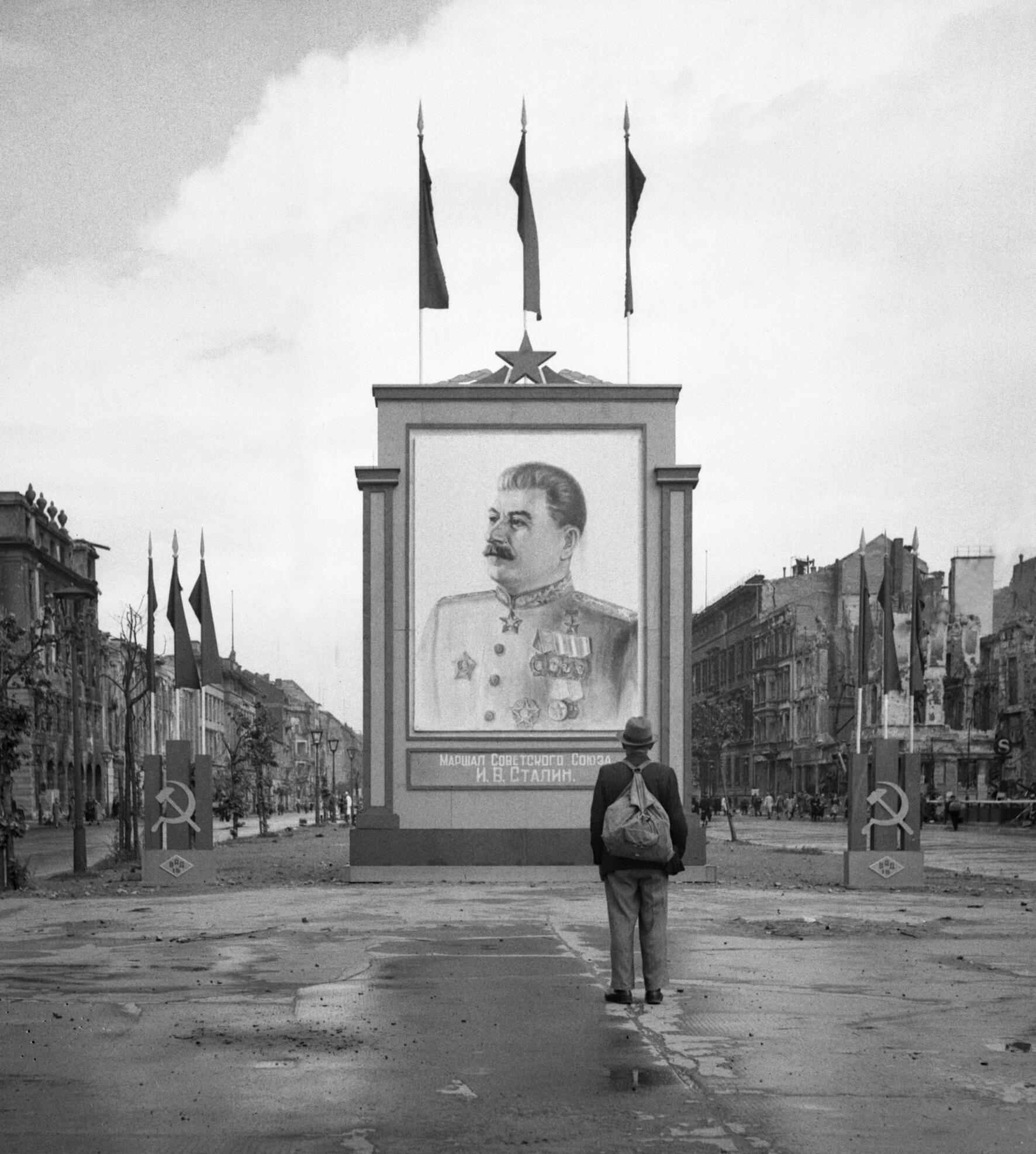
A giant poster of Stalin in Berlin, June 1945

In the first part of the war, the Red Army fielded weaponry of mixed quality. It had excellent artillery, but it did not have enough trucks to manoeuvre and supply it; as a result the Wehrmacht (which rated it highly) captured much of it. Red Army T-34 tanks outclassed any other tanks the Germans had when they appeared in 1941, yet most of the Soviet armoured units were less advanced models; likewise, the same supply problem handicapped even the formations equipped with the most modern tanks. The Soviet Air Force initially performed poorly against the Germans. The quick advance of the Germans into the Soviet territory made reinforcement difficult, if not impossible, since much of the Soviet Union's military industry lay in the west of the country.

==== The Manchurian Campaign ====
After the end of the war in Europe, the Red Army attacked Japan and Manchukuo (Japan's puppet state in Manchuria) on 9 August 1945, and in combination with Mongolian and Chinese Communist forces rapidly overwhelmed the outnumbered Kwantung Army. Soviet forces also attacked in Sakhalin, in the Kuril Islands and in northern Korea. Japan surrendered unconditionally on 2 September 1945.

=== The Cold War ===
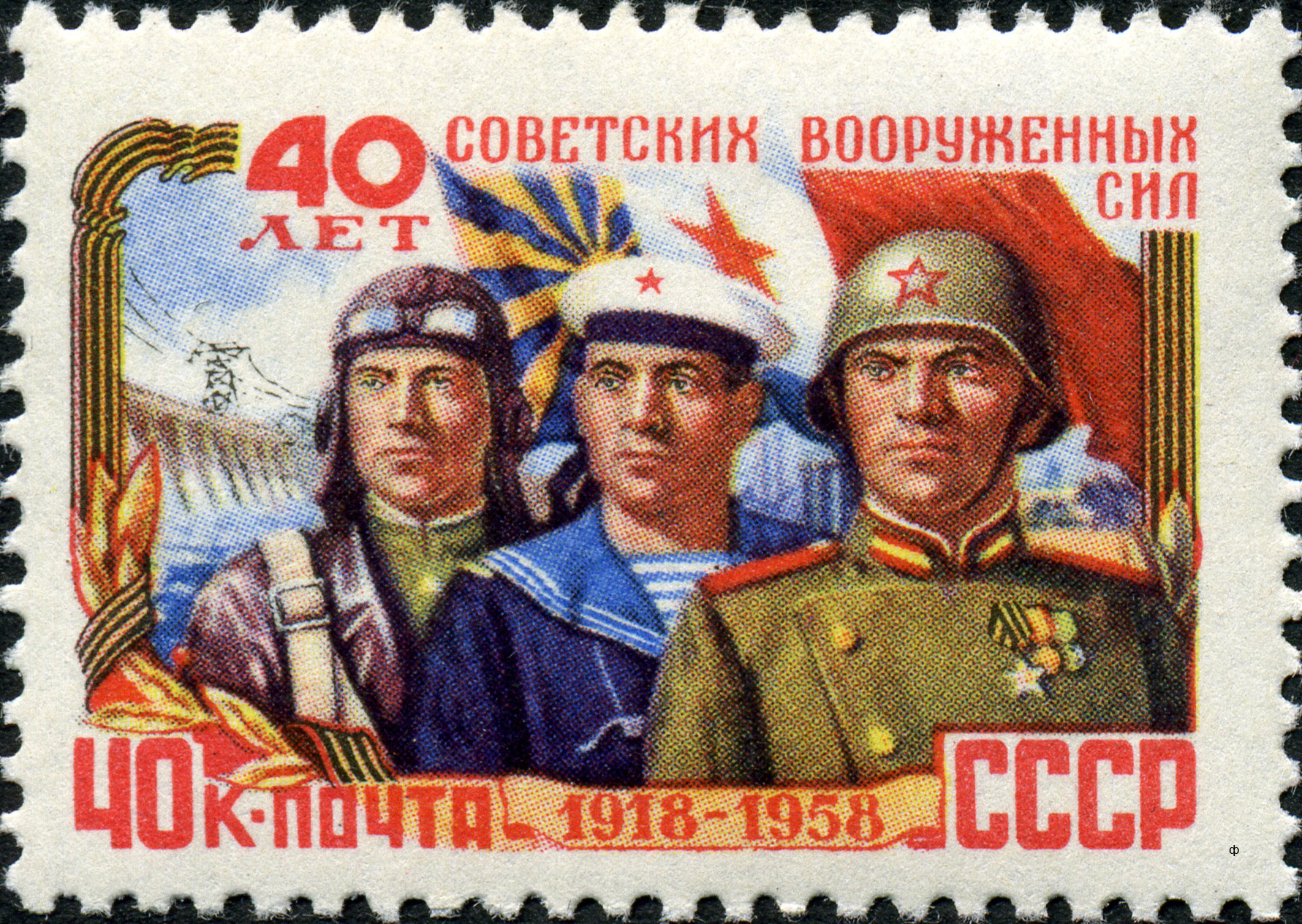
1958 stamp depicting the three main branches: Air Force, Navy and Army.

The Soviet Union only had Ground Forces, Air Forces, and the Navy in 1945. The two ministries (Narkomats), one supervising the Ground Forces and Air Forces, and the other directing the Navy, were combined into the Ministry of the Armed Forces in March 1946. A fourth service, the Troops of National Air Defence, was formed in 1948. The Ministry was briefly divided into two again from 1950 to 1953, but then was amalgamated again as the Ministry of Defence. Six years later the Strategic Rocket Forces were formed. The Soviet Airborne Forces, were also active by this time as a Reserve of the Supreme High Command. Also falling within the Soviet Armed Forces were the Tyl, or Rear Services.

Men within the Soviet Armed Forces dropped from around 11.3 million to approximately 2.8 million in 1948. In order to control this demobilisation process, the number of military districts was temporarily increased to thirty-three, dropping to twenty-one in 1946. The size of the Ground Forces during most of the Cold War remained between 4 million and 5 million, according to Western estimates. However, there was a large-scale reduction in force size in 1953–56; 1.1 million personnel were released from the armed forces. Two military districts were disestablished in 1956. Soviet law required all able-bodied males of age to serve a minimum of two years. As a result, the Soviet Ground Forces remained the largest active army in the world from 1945 to 1991. Soviet units which had taken over the countries of Eastern Europe from German rule remained to secure the régimes in what became satellite states of the Soviet Union and to deter and to fend off pro-independence resistance and later NATO forces. The greatest Soviet military presence was in East Germany, in the Group of Soviet Forces in Germany, but there were also smaller forces elsewhere, including the Northern Group of Forces in Poland, the Central Group of Forces in Czechoslovakia, and the Southern Group of Forces in Hungary. In the Soviet Union itself, forces were divided by the 1950s among fifteen military districts, including the Moscow, Leningrad, and Baltic Military Districts.

The trauma of the devastating German invasion of 1941 influenced the Soviet Cold War doctrine of fighting enemies on their own territory, or in a buffer zone under Soviet hegemony, but in any case preventing any war from reaching Soviet soil. In order to secure Soviet interests in Eastern Europe, the Soviet Army moved in to quell anti-Soviet uprisings in the German Democratic Republic (1953), Hungary (1956) and Czechoslovakia (1968). As a result of the Sino-Soviet border conflict, a sixteenth military district was created in 1969, the Central Asian Military District, with headquarters at Alma-Ata. To improve capabilities for war at a theatre level, in the late 1970s and early 1980s four high commands were established, grouping the military districts, groups of forces, and fleets. The Far Eastern High Command was established first, followed by the Western and South-Western High Commands towards Europe, and the Southern High Command at Baku, oriented toward the Middle East.

Confrontation with the US and NATO during the Cold War mainly took the form of threatened mutual deterrence with nuclear weapons. But a number of proxy wars took place. The Soviet Union and the United States supported loyal client régimes or rebel movements in Third World countries. During the Korean War, the Soviet Air Forces directly fought against United States and United Nations Command (UNC) forces. Two Soviet air divisions flying MiG-9 and MiG-15 fighter jets were sent against U.S. Boeing B-29 Superfortress bombers and their U.S. and allied fighter escorts. The Soviet Union invested heavily in nuclear capabilities, especially in the production of ballistic missiles and of nuclear submarines to deliver them.

During the Vietnam War, Soviet ships in the South China Sea gave vital early warnings to PAVN/VC forces in South Vietnam. The Soviet intelligence ships would pick up American B-52 bombers flying from Okinawa and Guam. Their airspeed and direction would be noted and then relayed to the Central Office for South Vietnam, North Vietnam's southern headquarters. Using airspeed and direction, COSVN analysts would calculate the bombing target and tell any assets to move "perpendicularly to the attack trajectory." These advance warnings gave them time to move out of the way of the bombers, and, while the bombing runs caused extensive damage, because of the early warnings from 1968 to 1970 they did not kill a single military or civilian leader in the headquarters complexes.

==== Military doctrine ====
The Soviet meaning of military doctrine was much different from U.S. military usage of the term. Soviet Minister of Defence Marshal Andrei Grechko defined it in 1975 as 'a system of views on the nature of war and methods of waging it, and on the preparation of the country and army for war, officially adopted in a given state and its armed forces.' Soviet theorists emphasised both the political and 'military-technical' sides of military doctrine, while from the Soviet point of view, Westerners ignored the political side. According to Harriet F Scott and William Scott, the political parts of Soviet military doctrine best explained the international moves that the Soviet Union undertook during the Cold War.

==== The war in Afghanistan ====
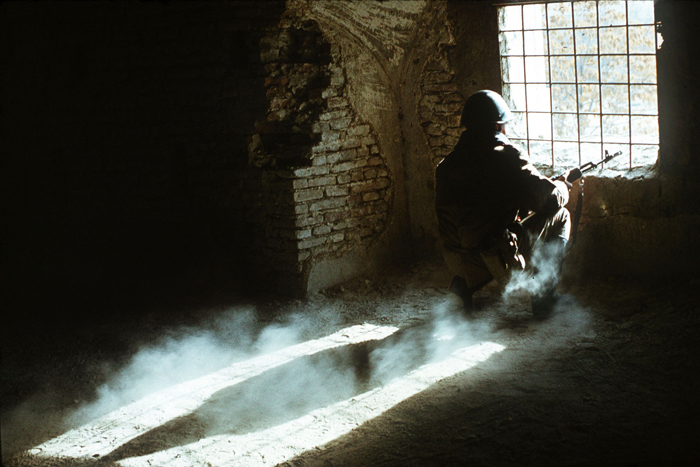
A Soviet soldier in Afghanistan, 1988

In 1979, however, the Soviet Army intervened in a civil war raging in Afghanistan. The Soviet Army came to back a Soviet-friendly communist government threatened by multinational, mainly Afghan, insurgent groups called the mujahideen. The insurgents received military training in neighboring Pakistan, China, and billions of dollars from the United States, Saudi Arabia, and other countries. Technically superior, the Soviets did not have enough troops to establish control over the countryside and to secure the border. This resulted from hesitancy in the Politburo, which allowed only a "limited contingent", averaging between 80,000 and 100,000 troops. Consequently, local insurgents could effectively employ hit-and-run tactics, using easy escape-routes and good supply-channels. This made the Soviet situation hopeless from the military point of view (short of using "scorched earth" tactics, which the Soviets did not practice except in World War II in their own territory). The understanding of this made the war highly unpopular within the Army. With the coming of glasnost, Soviet media started to report heavy losses, which made the war very unpopular in the USSR in general, even though actual losses remained modest, averaging 1670 per year. The war also became a sensitive issue internationally, which finally led General Secretary Mikhail Gorbachev to withdraw the Soviet forces from Afghanistan. The "Afghan Syndrome" suffered by the Army parallels the American Vietnam Syndrome trauma over their own unsuccessful war in Vietnam. Tactically, both sides concentrated on attacking supply lines, but Afghan mujahideen were well dug-in with tunnels and defensive positions, holding out against artillery and air attacks. The decade long war resulted in millions of Afghans fleeing their country, mostly to Pakistan and Iran. At least half a million Afghan civilians were killed in addition to the rebels in the war.

=== The end of the Soviet Union ===
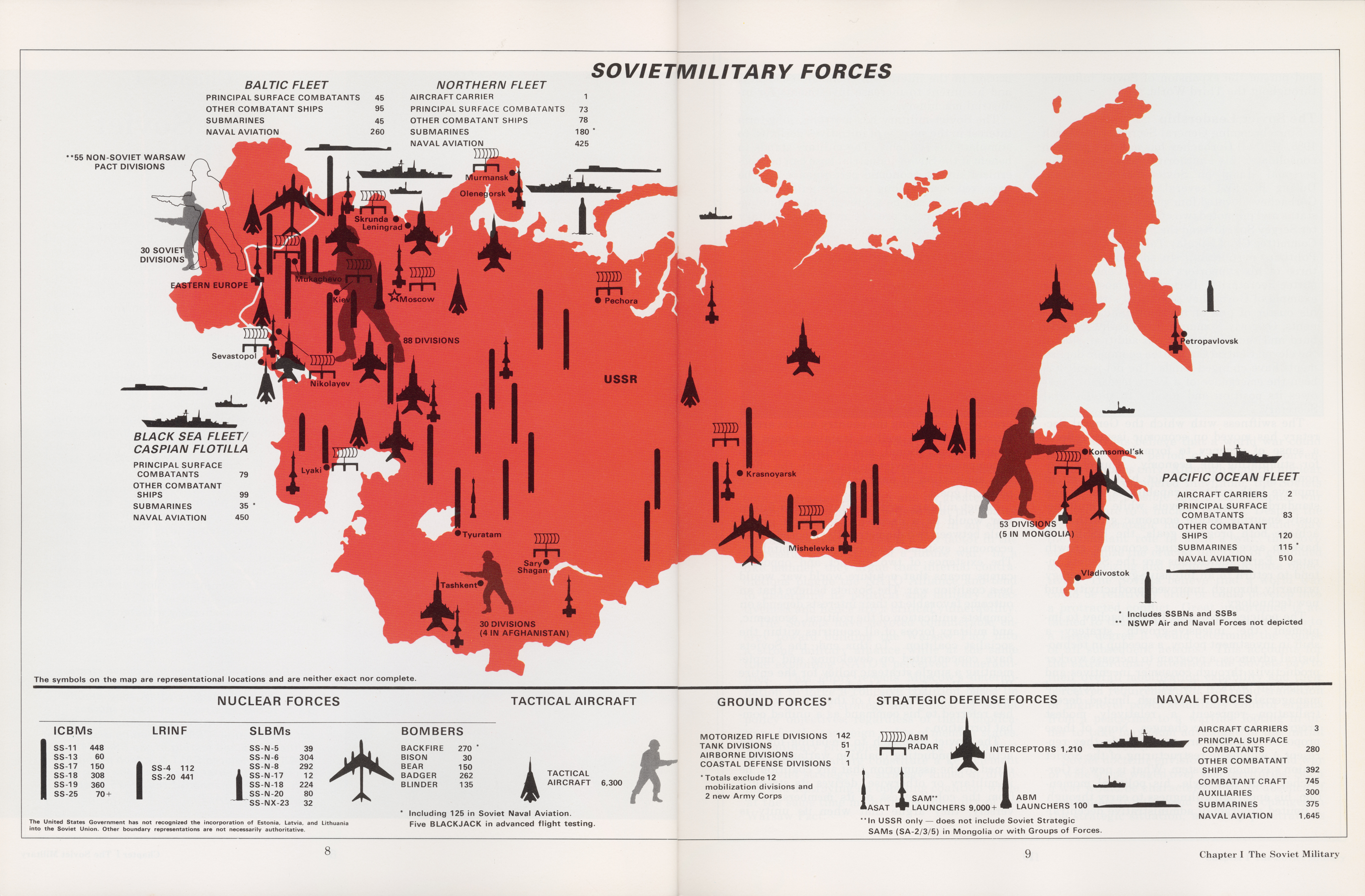
Soviet Military Forces in 1986 (U.S. map).

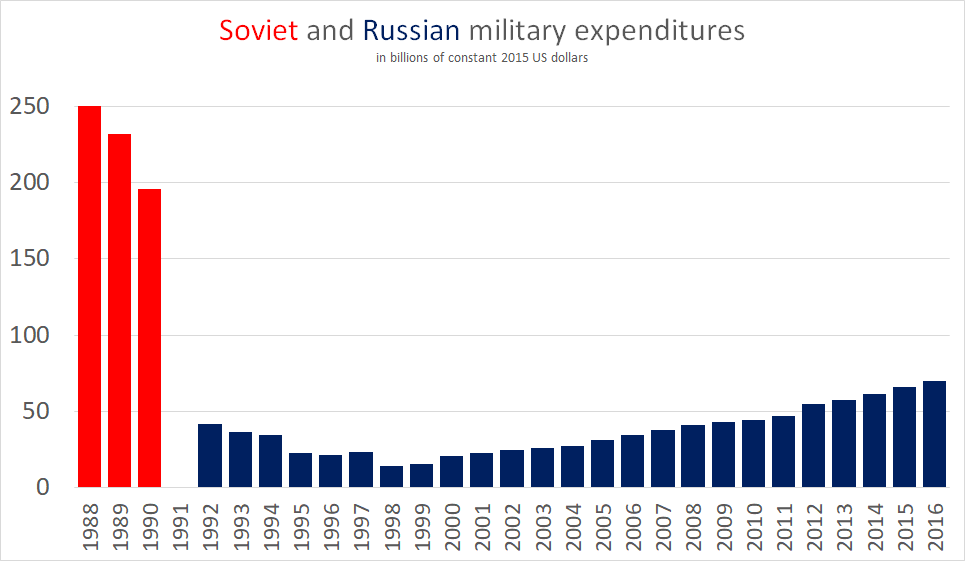
Soviet and Russian military expenditures in billions of 2015 US dollars

From 1985 to 1991, the new leader of the Soviet Union, Mikhail Gorbachev, attempted to reduce the military strain on the economy. His government slowly reduced the size of the army. By 1989 Soviet troops were leaving their Warsaw Pact neighbors to fend for themselves. That same year Soviet forces left Afghanistan. By the end of 1990, the entire Eastern Bloc had collapsed in the wake of democratic revolutions. As a result, Soviet citizens quickly began to turn against the Soviet government as well. As the Soviet Union moved towards disintegration, the reduced military was rendered feeble and ineffective and could no longer prop up the ailing Soviet government. The military got involved in trying to suppress conflicts and unrest in Central Asia and the Caucasus but it often proved incapable of restoring peace and order. On April 9, 1989, the army, together with MVD units, massacred about 190 demonstrators in Tbilisi in Georgia. The next major crisis occurred in Azerbaijan, when the Soviet army forcibly entered Baku on January 19–20, 1990, removing the rebellious republic government and allegedly killing hundreds of civilians in the process. On January 13, 1991, Soviet forces stormed the State Radio and Television Building and the television retranslation tower in Vilnius, Lithuania, both under opposition control, killing 14 people and injuring 700. This action was perceived by many as heavy-handed and achieved little.

By mid-1991, the Soviet Union had reached a state of emergency. According to the official commission (the Soviet Academy of Sciences) appointed by the Supreme Soviet (the higher chamber of the Russian parliament) immediately after the events of August 1991, the Army did not play a significant role in what some describe as coup d'état of old-guard communists. Commanders sent tanks into the streets of Moscow, but (according to all the commanders and soldiers) only with orders to ensure the safety of the people. It remains unclear why exactly the military forces entered the city, but they clearly did not have the goal of overthrowing Gorbachev (absent on the Black Sea coast at the time) or the government. The coup failed primarily because the participants did not take any decisive action, and after several days of their inaction the coup simply stopped. Only one confrontation took place between civilians and the tank crews during the coup, which led to the deaths of three civilians. Although the victims became proclaimed heroes, the authorities acquitted the tank crew of all charges. Nobody issued orders to shoot at anyone.

Following the coup attempt of August 1991, the leadership of the Soviet Union retained practically no authority over the component republics. Nearly every Soviet Republic declared its intention to secede and began passing laws defying the Supreme Soviet. On December 8, 1991, the Presidents of Russia, Belarus, and Ukraine declared the Soviet Union dissolved and signed the document setting up the Commonwealth of Independent States (CIS). Gorbachev finally resigned on December 25, 1991, and the following day the Supreme Soviet, the highest governmental body, dissolved itself, officially ending the Soviet Union's existence. For the next year and a half various attempts were made to keep the Soviet military in existence as the United Armed Forces of the Commonwealth of Independent States. Steadily, the units stationed in Ukraine and some other breakaway republics swore loyalty to their new national governments, while a series of treaties between the newly independent states divided up the military's assets. Following dissolution of the Soviet Union, the Soviet Army dissolved and the USSR's successor states shared out its assets among themselves. The share out mostly occurred on a regional basis, with Soviet soldiers from Russia becoming part of the new Russian Army, while Soviet soldiers originating from Kazakhstan became part of the new Kazakh Armed Forces.

On 7 May 1992, Yeltsin signed a decree establishing the Russian Armed Forces and assumed the duties of the Supreme Commander-in-Chief. This marked a crucial step in the creation of the new Armed Forces of the Russian Federation, the bulk of what was still left of the old Soviet forces. The last vestiges of the old Soviet command structure were finally dissolved in June 1993. In the next few years, the former Soviet forces withdrew from central and Eastern Europe (including the Baltic states), as well as from the newly independent post-Soviet republics of Azerbaijan, Georgia (partially), Moldova (partially), Turkmenistan and Uzbekistan. In 2020, Russian forces remained in Abkhazia, Armenia, Belarus, Kazakhstan, Kyrgyzstan, South Ossetia, Tajikistan and Transnistria. While in many places the withdrawal and division took place without any problems, the Russian Navy's Black Sea Fleet remained in the Crimea, Ukraine, with the fleet division and a Russian leasehold for fleet bases in Crimea finally achieved in 1997.

== Structure and leadership ==
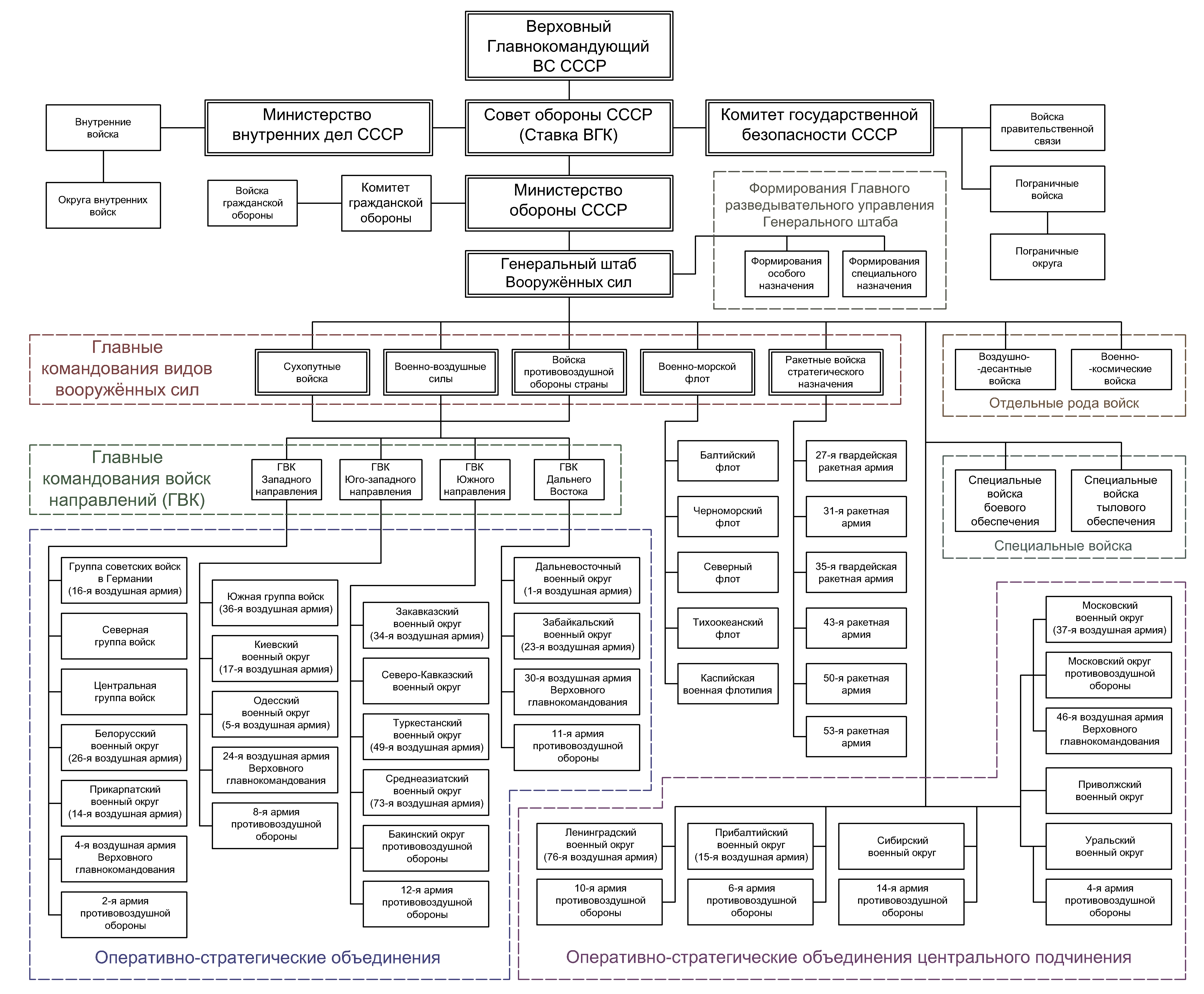
The scheme of command and control of the Armed Forces of the Soviet Union at the beginning of 1989 (V.I. Feskov et al. 2013)

The Soviet Armed Forces were controlled by the Communist Party of the Soviet Union and the Ministry of Defence. At its head was the Minister of Defence, generally a full member of the Politburo (the Politburo, in turn, was chaired by the General Secretary of the Communist Party of the Soviet Union, generally the de facto leader of the Soviet Union) and from 1934 onwards, a Marshal of the Soviet Union. Stalin was the last civilian/politician Minister of Defence; from 1947 onwards, the Minister of Defence was a serving general (though the last was an airman). Between 1934 and 1946, 1950 and 1953, a separate Ministry of the Navy existed and the Ministry of Defence was responsible only for land and air forces. In practice, the Navy Minister was a far more junior official and the Defence Ministry continued to dominate policymaking.

Beneath the Minister of Defence were two First Deputy Ministers of Defence; the Chief of the General Staff, who was responsible for operations and planning, and the First Deputy Minister of Defence for General Affairs, who was responsible for administration. From 1955 the Supreme Commander of the Warsaw Pact also held the title of First Deputy Minister of Defence. By the 1980s there was another eleven Deputy Minister of Defence; including the commanders-in-chief of the five service branches.

In 1989, the Soviet Armed Forces consisted of the Strategic Rocket Forces, the Ground Forces, Air Defence Forces, the Air Forces, and the Navy, listed in their official order of importance. The Rear services, "Tyl", had their own deputy minister of defence. In 1970 the troops of the All-Union National Civil Defence Forces were added.

There were also a number of armed organisations beyond the Ministry of Defence; in 1989 these included Internal Troops and the KGB Border Troops.

== Personnel ==
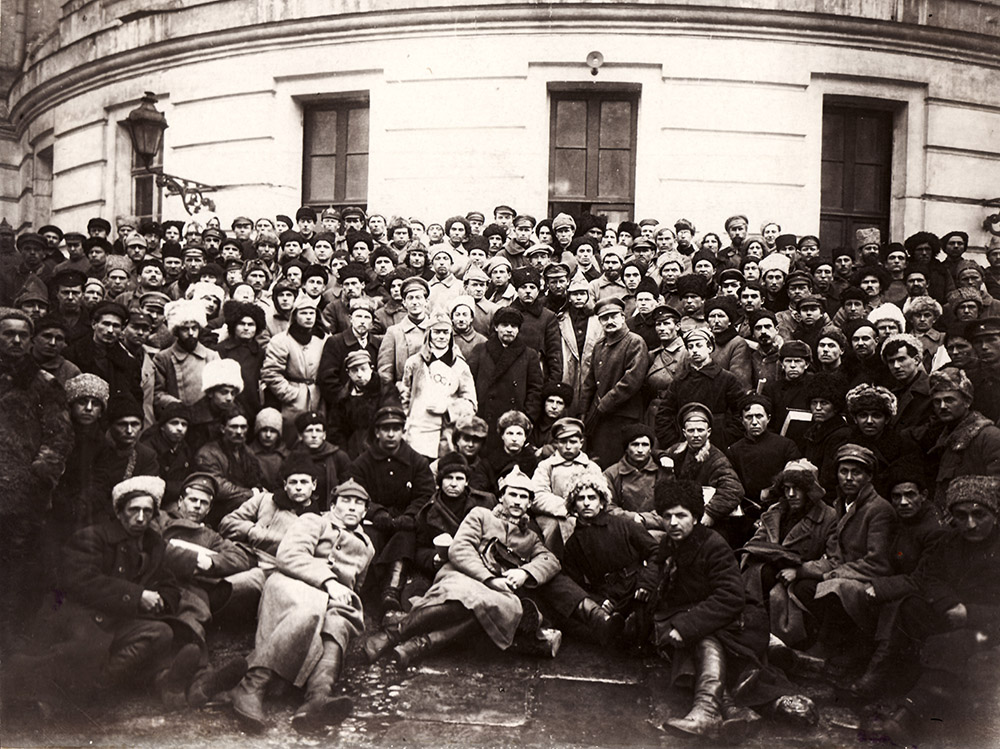
Vladimir Lenin, Leon Trotsky and soldiers of the Red Army in Petrograd, 1921

=== Ranks and titles ===
The early Red Army never adopted the idea of a professional officer corps. It was seen as a "heritage of tsarism.". In particular, the Bolsheviks condemned the use of the word "officer" and used the word "commander" instead. The Red Army never adopted epaulettes and ranks, using purely functional titles such as "Division Commander", "Corps Commander", and similar titles. In 1924 it supplemented this system with "service categories", from K-1 (lowest) to K-14 (highest). The service categories essentially operated as ranks in disguise: they indicated the experience and qualifications of a commander. The insignia now denoted the category, not the position of a commander. However, one still had to use functional titles to address commanders, which could become as awkward as "comrade deputy head-of-staff of corps". If one did not know a commander's position, one used one of the possible positions—for example: "Regiment Commander" for K-9.

On September 22, 1935, the Red Army abandoned service categories and introduced personal ranks. These ranks, however, used a unique mix of functional titles and traditional ranks. For example, the ranks included "Lieutenant" and "Komdiv" (Комдив, Division Commander). Further complications ensued from the functional and categorical ranks for political officers (e.g., "Brigade Commissar", "Army Commissar 2nd Rank"), for technical corps (e.g., "Engineer 3rd Rank", "Division Engineer"), for administrative, medical and other non-combatant branches. The year before (1934), the revival of personal ranks began with the Marshal of the Soviet Union rank bestowed upon 5 Army Commanders.

There were further modifications to the system. 1937 saw the Junior Lieutenant and Junior Military Technician ranks being added. On May 7, 1940, the ranks of "General" or "Admiral" replaced the senior functional ranks of Kombrig, Komdiv, Komkor, Komandarm; the other senior functional ranks ("Division Commissar", "Division Engineer", etc.) remained unaffected. On November 2, 1940, the system underwent further modification with the abolition of functional ranks for non-commissioned officers (NCOs) and the introduction of the Podpolkovnik (Lieutenant Colonel) rank.

In early 1942 all the functional ranks in technical and administrative corps became regularised ranks (e.g., "Engineer Major", "Engineer Colonel", "Captain of the Intendant Service", etc.). On October 9, 1942, the authorities abolished the system of military commissars, together with the commissar ranks. The functional ranks remained only in medical, veterinary and legislative corps. By then the Naval rank of Midshipman was revived in the Soviet Navy as an NCO rank, a role lasting until the 1970s.

In early 1943 a unification of the system saw the abolition of all the remaining functional ranks. The word "officer" became officially endorsed, together with the epaulettes that superseded the previous rank insignia. The ranks and insignia of 1943 did not change much until the last days of the USSR; the contemporary Russian Army uses largely the same system. The old functional ranks of Kombat (Battalion or Battery Commander), Kombrig (Brigade Commander) and Komdiv (Division Commander) continue in informal use.

By the end of the Second World War, the Admiral of the Fleet rank (which, from 1945 was already equivalent to Marshal) was later renamed Admiral of the Fleet of the Soviet Union in 1955. In the 1960s however, it became a rank of its own when new regulations revived the Fleet Admiral rank in the Soviet Navy, thus becoming the naval equivalent to General of the Army.

By 1972, the final transformation of military ranks began as the rank of Praporshchik (Warrant officer) ranks being added in the Army and Air Force for contract NCOs since the rank of Starshina (Sergeant Major) was from now on for conscripts. But in the Soviet Navy, it meant that the Naval rank of Midshipman became a rank for Naval warrant officers since the Navy created the new rank of Ship Chief Sergeant Major for its NCOs in naval service. The year of 1974 saw the rank insignia changed for Army Generals and Navy Fleet Admirals in their parade dress and working and combat dress uniforms.

=== General Staff ===
On September 22, 1935, the authorities renamed the RKKA Staff as the General Staff, which essentially reincarnated the General Staff of the Russian Empire. Many of the former RKKA Staff officers had served as General Staff officers in the Russian Empire and became General Staff officers in the USSR. General Staff officers typically had extensive combat experience and solid academic training.

=== Military education ===
During the Civil War the commander cadres received training at the General Staff Academy of the RKKA (Академия Генерального штаба РККА), an alias of the Nicholas General Staff Academy (Николаевская академия Генерального штаба) of the Russian Empire. On August 5, 1921, the academy became the Military Academy of the RKKA (Военная академия РККА), and in 1925 the Frunze (М.В. Фрунзе) Military Academy of the RKKA. The senior and supreme commanders received training at the Higher Military Academic Courses (Высшие военно-академические курсы), renamed in 1925 as the Advanced Courses for Supreme Command (Курсы усовершенствования высшего начальствующего состава); in 1931, the establishment of an Operations Faculty at the Frunze Military Academy supplemented these courses. On April 2, 1936, the General Staff Academy was re-instated; it became a principal school for the senior and supreme commanders of the Red Army and a centre for advanced military studies.

Red Army (and later Soviet Army) educational facilities called "academies" do not correspond to the military academies in Western countries. Those Soviet Academies were the post-graduate schools, mandatory for officers applying for senior ranks (e.g., the rank of colonel since the 1950s). While a basic officer education in the Red Army was provided by the facilities named военная школа or военное училище–which may be generally translated as "school" and compared to Western "academies" like West Point or Sandhurst.

=== Manpower and enlisted men ===
The Soviet Armed Forces were manned through conscription, which had been reduced in 1967 from three to two years (with remaining three years service in naval forces). This system was administered through the thousands of Military commissariats (voenkomats) located throughout the Soviet Union. Between January and May of every year, every young Soviet male citizen was required to report to the local voenkomat for assessment for military service, following a summons based on lists from every school and employer in the area. The voenkomat worked to quotas sent out by a department of the General Staff, listing how young men are required by each service and branch of the Armed Forces. The new conscripts were then picked up by an officer from their future unit and usually sent by train across the country. On arrival, they would begin the Young Soldiers' course, and become part of the system of hazing and domination by an older class of draftees, known as dedovshchina, literally "rule by the grandfathers."

The Soviet Armed Forces worked under a cadre-conscript system, under which most of the professional full-time service members would be officers while most enlisted personnel would be conscript. The "armed forces of the USSR and Warsaw Pact, working to a common Soviet model, [...] relied on young officers to conduct in units [rather than in training depots] all the junior command and training tasks which in many Western armies are done in depots or by regular professional long-service NCOs." There were only a very small number of professional non-commissioned officers (NCOs), as most NCOs were conscripts sent on short courses to prepare them for section commanders' and platoon sergeants' positions. These conscript NCOs were supplemented by praporshchik warrant officers, positions only reintroduced in 1972, after being abolished in 1917, as part of a movement towards the professionalization of the army. Most institutional knowledge was in the hands of those professional officers while very few possibilities of advancement existed for the enlisted. The ratio of officers to enlisted was greater than Western armies as many units were only manned by the cadre of officers in times of peace and were expected to be filled by mobilized former conscripts in times of war.

=== Ethnic Composition and Tension ===
For years, Soviet leadership argued that Soviet military played a role in decreasing ethnic tensions and nationalist loyalties. According to professor Deborah Yarsike Ball, Soviet historians, such as B. F. Klochkov, argued that, "the Red Army strengthened friendship between soldiers of various nationalities." The official view of the military was that it was a "school of internationalism," where all the various people of the Soviet Union could develop unity and respect for each other. During the Russian Civil War, the Bolshevik government employed non-Slavic ethnic groups, who were known as national military units.

Despite the official view, the history of inter-ethnic relations in the military was more complicated. As the Bolsheviks consolidated power in the late 1910s and early 1920s, the central leadership became suspicious of the size of the national units. Their sizes were restricted, they were put under close supervision, and eventually disbanded by 1938. The national units were briefly brought back during World War II before being disbanded again in the mid-1950s. In 1956, when soldier were ordered to respond to protesters in the Georgian capital of Tbilisi, the ethnic-Georgian unit refused to follow orders from their Russian higher-ranking officers.

Soviet minorities were not treated equally and many carried anti-regime views. According to a 1983 RAND Corporation report by Alexander Alexiev and S. Enders Wimbush, the Second World War saw the recruitment of 600,000 to 1,400,000 former Soviet citizens into the German military on the Eastern Front. Interestingly, more than 50% of these auxiliaries came from non-Russian backgrounds, such as Ukrainians, Lithuanians, Latvians, and Estonians. In addition, more than 250,000 volunteer nationals of Central Asian and Caucasian origin were organized in the Ostlegionen. As the authors noted, "some Soviet nationalities may have been better represented in the Wehrmacht than in the Red Army." At the height of World War II, infantry units in the armed forces were composed of Russians (62.95%), Ukrainians (14.52%), Belarusians (1.9%), and various other ethnicities (20.63%). The war had shown that the integration of various ethnic groups was questionable and fragile.

Inter-ethnic relations in the military did not improve after World War II. In fact, although the Russian language was crucial in the organization, many non-Slavic servicemen entered the military with "no previous to communicate in Russian." According to a 1980 Time magazine article citing an analyst from the RAND Corporation, Soviet non-Slavs were also generally barred from joining elite or strategic positions (like the Strategic Rocket Forces, Soviet Air Force and the Soviet Navy) of the late-Cold War military because of suspicions of loyalty of ethnic minorities to the Kremlin. Around 80% or more of combat units were staffed by Slavic nationalities while non-combat units usually contained 70% to 90% non-Slavs, especially Central Asians and Caucasians. The military branches associated with high technology services, such as the Navy, Strategic Rocket Forces, and the Air Force, were disproportionately made up of Russians. In addition, Russians made up 69.4% of the officer corps, while the Slavic number is up to 89.7%.

By 1990, Slavic troops still made a majority of Soviet soldiers. In total, 69.2% of all military members were ethnic Slavic (Russian, Ukrainian, Belorussian), 1.9% were Baltic people, 20.6% were Muslim-Turkic people and 8.3% were all other types of people.

=== Purge ===
The late 1930s saw the "Purges of the Red Army cadres", occurring against the historical background of the Great Purge. The Purges had the objective of cleansing the Red Army of "politically unreliable elements", mainly among the higher-ranking officers. This inevitably provided a convenient pretext for settling personal vendettas and eventually resulted in a witch-hunt. In 1937, the Red Army numbered around 1.3 million, and it grew to almost three times that number by June 1941. This necessitated quick promotion of junior officers, often despite their lack of experience or training, with obvious grave implications for the effectiveness of the Army in the coming war against Germany.

In the highest echelons of the Red Army the Purges removed 3 of the 5 marshals, 13 of 15 generals of the army, 8 of 9 admirals, 50 of 57 army corps generals, 154 out of 186 division generals, 16 of 16 army commissars, and 25 of 28 army corps commissars.

== Party control of the Armed Forces ==
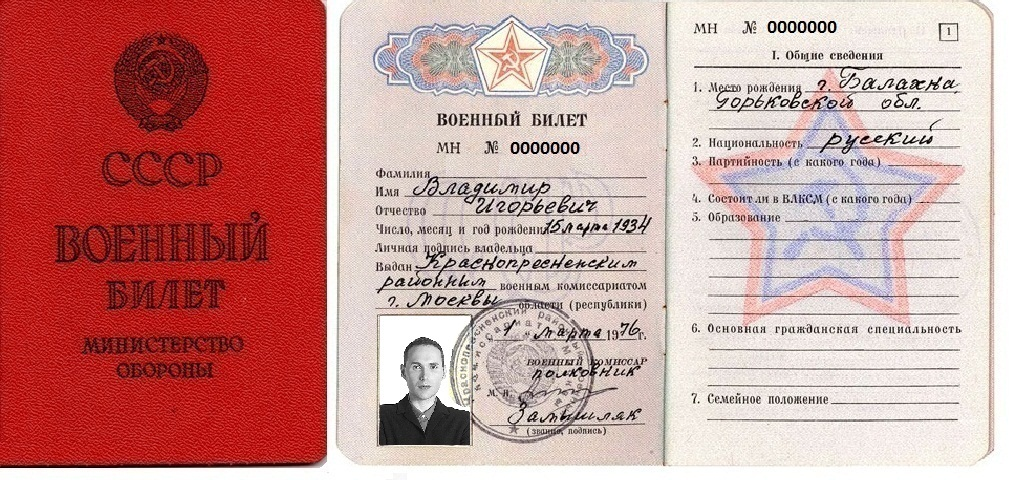
Soviet Army conscript's military service book.#1, Place of birth, #2 Nationality (i.e. ethnicity), #3 Party affiliation (i.e. the year of joining the CPSU), #4 Year of entering the VLKSM (Komsomol), #5 Education, #6 Main specialty, #7 Marital status. (Document number and the name are removed).

The Communist Party had a number of mechanisms of control over the country's armed forces. First, starting from a certain rank, only a Party member could be a military commander, and was thus subject to Party discipline. Second, the top military leaders had been systematically integrated into the highest echelons of the party. Third, the party placed a network of political officers throughout the armed forces to influence the activities of the military.

A political commander (zampolit) served as a political commissar of the armed forces. A zampolit supervised party organizations and conducted party political work within a military unit. He lectured troops on Marxism–Leninism, the Soviet view of international affairs, and the party's tasks for the armed forces. During World War II the zampolit lost veto authority over the commander's decisions but retained the power to report to the next highest political officer or organization on the political attitudes and performance of the unit's commander.

In 1989 over 20% of all armed forces personnel were party members or Komsomol members. Over 90% of all officers in the armed forces were party or Komsomol members.

== Weapons and equipment ==
The Soviet Union established an indigenous arms industry as part of Stalin's industrialization program in the 1920s and 1930s. The five-round, stripper clip-fed, bolt-action Mosin–Nagant rifle remained the primary shoulder firearm of the Red Army through World War II. Over 17 million model 91/30 Mosin–Nagant rifles were manufactured from 1930 to 1945 by various Soviet arsenals. In 1943 design started on the M44, designed to replace the M91/30. Full production began in 1944, and remained in production until 1948, when it was replaced by the SKS semiautomatic rifle.

The Red Army suffered from a shortage of adequate machine guns and semiautomatic firearms throughout World War II. The semiautomatic Tokarev SVT Model 38 and Model 40 were chambered for the same 7.62×54mmR cartridge used by the Mosin–Nagants. The rifle, though of sound design, was never manufactured in the same numbers as the Mosin–Nagants and did not replace them. Soviet experimentation with small-arms began during the Second World War. In 1945 the Red Army adopted the Simonov SKS, a semi-automatic 7.62×39mm carbine. In 1949 production of the 7.62×39mm Kalashnikov AK-47 assault rifle began: planners envisaged troops using it in conjunction with the SKS, but it soon replaced the SKS completely. In 1959 the AKM came out as a modernised version of the AK-47, this was created to ease manufacture and improve aspects of the AK-47. In 1978 the 5.45×39mm AK-74 assault rifle replaced the AKM: it utilized no less than 51% of the AKM's parts. Designers put together the new weapon as a counterpart to the American 5.56×45mm cartridge used in the M16 assault rifle, and the Russian army continues to use it today.

After the dissolution of the Soviet Union in 1991, a considerable number of weapons were transferred to the national forces of emerging states on the periphery of the former Soviet Union, such as Armenia, Azerbaijan and Tajikistan. Similarly, weapons and other military equipment were also left behind in the Soviet withdrawal from Afghanistan in 1989. Some of these items were sold on the black market or through weapons merchants. In turn, some ended up with terrorist organizations such as al-Qaeda. A 1999 book argued that the greatest opportunity for terrorist organizations to procure weapons was in the former Soviet Union.

In 2007, the World Bank estimated that out of the 500 million total firearms available worldwide, 100 million were of the Kalashnikov family, and 75 million were AK-47s. However, only about 5 million of these were manufactured in the former USSR.

== See also ==
- Women in the Soviet military
- List of Soviet Union military bases abroad
- Comparative military ranks of World War II
- List of military aircraft of the Soviet Union and the CIS
- Defence Council of the Soviet Union
- Ministry of Defence of the Soviet Union
- Stavka of the Supreme High Command of the Soviet Union (WW2)
- Reserve of the Supreme High Command
- Military Collegium of the Supreme Court of the Soviet Union (military court)
- Soviet Union in World War II
- Mikhail Tukhachevsky
- Soviet war crimes
