= Military history of the Soviet Union =

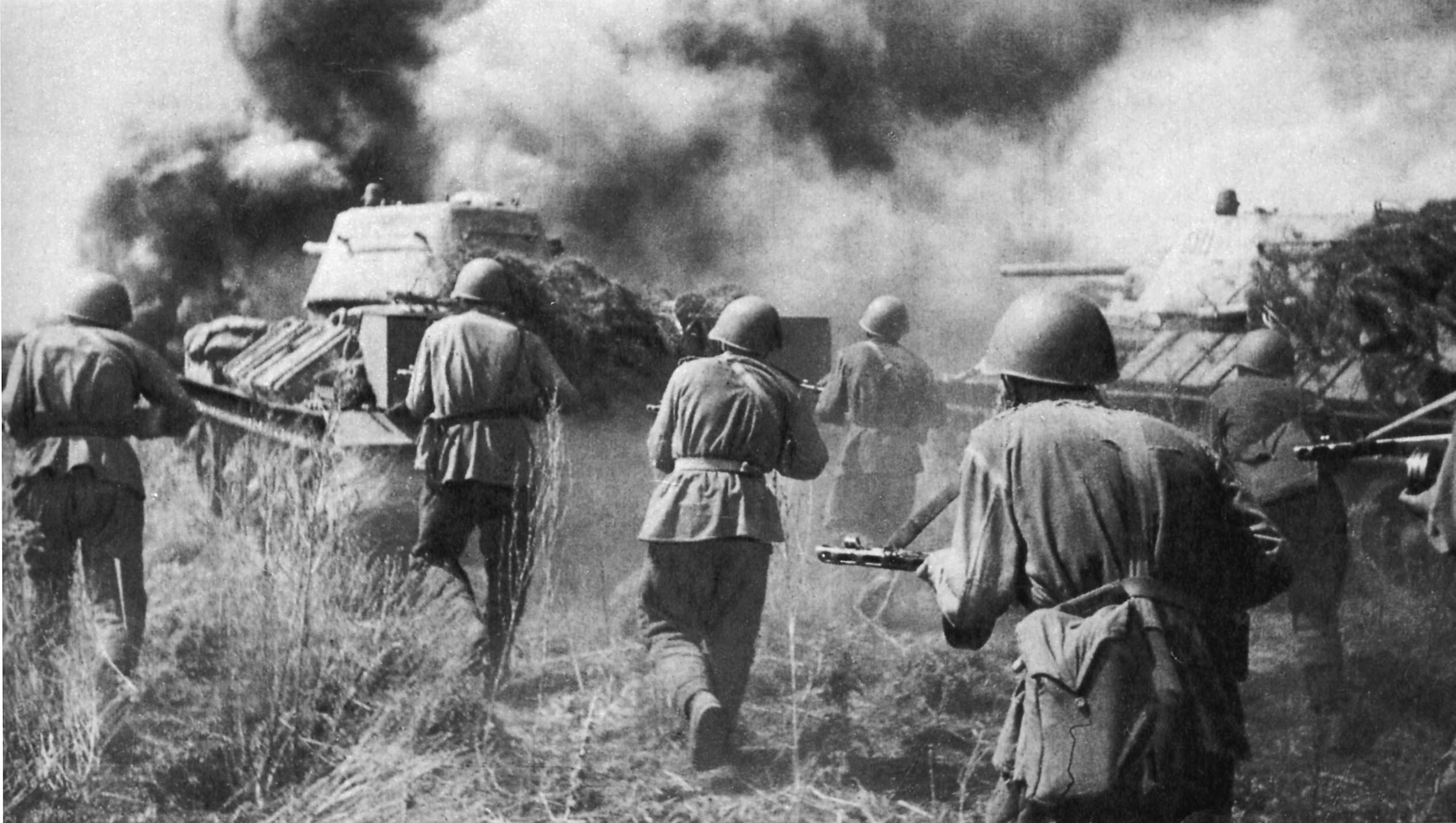
Soviet troops in the Battle of Kursk

The military history of the Soviet Union began in the days following the 1917 October Revolution that brought the Bolsheviks to power. In 1918 the new government formed the Red Army, which then defeated its various internal enemies in the Russian Civil War of 1917–22. The years 1918–21 saw defeats for the Red Army in the Polish–Soviet War (1919–21) and in independence wars for Estonia (1918–20), Latvia (1918–20) and Lithuania (1918–19). The Red Army invaded Finland (November 1939); fought the Battles of Khalkhin Gol of May–September 1939 (together with its ally Mongolia) against Japan and its client state Manchukuo; it was deployed when the Soviet Union, in agreement with Nazi Germany, took part in the invasion of Poland in September 1939, and occupied the Baltic States (June 1940), Bessarabia (June–July 1940) and Northern Bukovina (June–July 1940) (from Romania). In World War II the Red Army became a major military force in the defeat of Nazi Germany and conquered Manchuria. After the war, it occupied East Germany and many nations in central and eastern Europe, which became satellite states in the Soviet bloc.

Following the Allies' victory over Germany and Japan in 1945, the Soviet Union became the sole superpower rival to the United States. The Cold War between the two nations led to military buildups, the nuclear arms race, and the Space Race. By the early 1980s the Soviet armed forces had more troops, tanks, artillery guns and nuclear weapons than any other nation on earth. The Soviet Union fell in 1991, not because of military defeat but because of economic and political factors - see History of the Soviet Union (1982–91).

The Soviet military consisted of five armed services - in their official order of importance:

- the Strategic Rocket Forces (service established in 1959)
- Ground Forces
- Air Forces
- Airborne Forces
- Air Defense Forces (separate service from 1949)
- Naval Forces
- Spetsnaz

Two other Soviet militarized forces existed: the Internal Troops (MVD Troops), subordinated to the Ministry of the Interior, and the Border Troops, subordinated to the KGB.

== Tsarist and revolutionary background ==
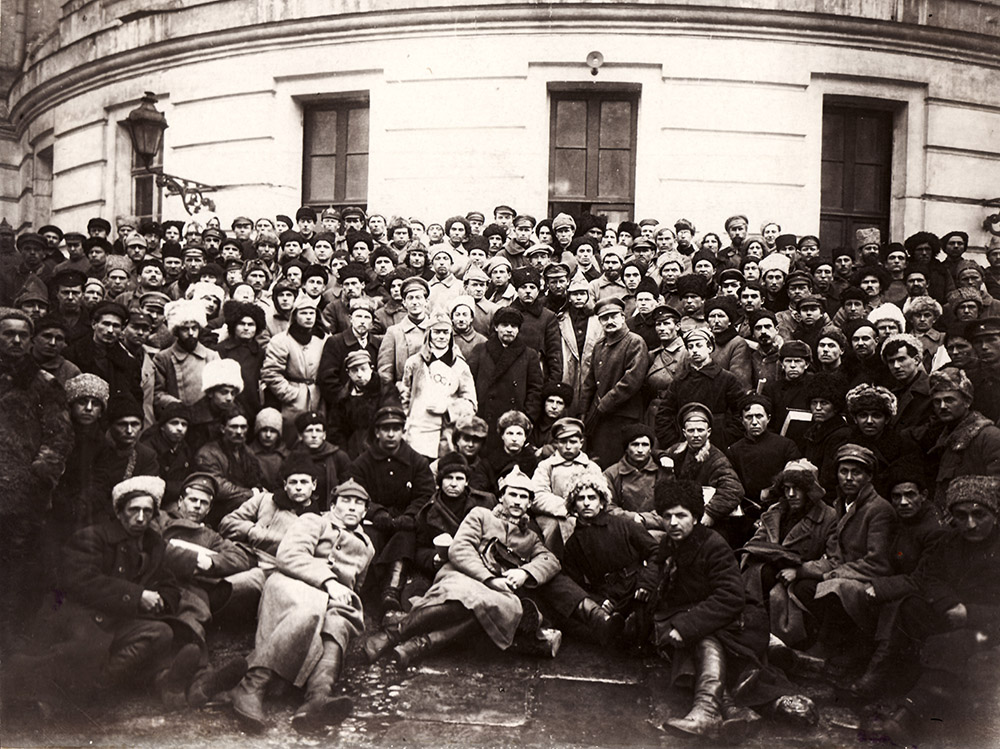
Members of the Red Army gather around Vladimir Lenin, Klim Voroshilov(behind Lenin) and Leon Trotsky in Petrograd.

The February Revolution replaced the Tsar with the Russian Provisional Government, 1917 which was itself overthrown by the Bolshevik Revolution of 1917. The Russian army, exhausted by its participation in World War I, was in the final stages of disintegration and collapse.

Even though Bolshevik influence in the ranks was strong, the officer corps was staffed with many who violently opposed communism. The Bolsheviks perceived the Tsarist army to be one of the foundations of the hated old regime, and decided to abolish it in favor of establishing a new military loyal to the Marxist cause. Thus the core of the Tsarist army became the core of the Russian Provisional Government army which became the core of the White Army, which in intermittent collaboration with interventionist forces from outside Russia (from Japan, Britain, France and the United States) aided the Whites and tried to contain the Red Army during the Russian Civil War.

On January 28, 1918 the Bolshevik leader Vladimir Lenin decreed the establishment of the Red Army, officially merging the 20,000 Red Guards, 60,000 Latvian red riflemen with 200,000 Baltic Fleet sailors and a handful of sympathetic Petrograd garrison soldiers. Leon Trotsky served as their first commissar for war.

The early Red Army was egalitarian and therefore poorly disciplined. The Bolsheviks considered military ranks and saluting to be bourgeois customs and abolished them; soldiers now elected their own leaders and voted on which orders to follow. This arrangement was abolished, however, under pressure of the Russian Civil War (1918–21), and ranks were reinstated.

During the civil war, the Bolsheviks fought counterrevolutionary groups that became known as the White armies as well as armies sponsored by Russia's former allies such as the Britain and France, which saw a need to overthrow the Bolshevik government. The Red Army enjoyed a series of initial victories over their opponents, and in a surge of optimism Lenin ordered the Soviet Western Army to advance West in the vacuum created by the German forces retreating from the Ober-Ost areas. This operation swept the newly formed Ukrainian People's Republic and Belarusian People's Republic and eventually lead to the Soviet invasion of Second Polish Republic, a newly independent state of the former Russian Empire. By invading Poland and initiating the Polish-Soviet War the Bolsheviks expressed their belief that they would eventually triumph over opposing capitalist forces both at home and abroad.

The overwhelming majority of professional officers in the Russian army were of nobility (dvoryanstvo); moreover, most of them had joined the White armies. Therefore, the Workers' and Peasants' Army initially faced a shortage of experienced military leaders. To remedy this, the Bolsheviks recruited 50,000 former Imperial Army officers to command the Red Army. At the same time, they attached political commissars to Red Army units to monitor the actions and loyalty of professional commanders, formally termed as "military specialists" (voyenspets, for voyenny spetsialist). By 1921 the Red Army had defeated four White armies and held off five armed foreign contingents that had intervened in the civil war, but began to face setbacks in Poland.

Polish forces managed to break a long streak of Bolshevik victories by launching a bold counteroffensive at the Battle of Warsaw in August 1920. At Warsaw the Red Army suffered a defeat so great and so unexpected that it turned the course of the entire war and eventually forced the Soviets to accept the unfavorable conditions offered by the Treaty of Riga, signed on March 18, 1921. It was the biggest defeat of the Red Army in history.

After the civil war, the Red Army became an increasingly professional military organization. With most of its five million soldiers demobilized, the Red Army was transformed into a small regular force, and territorial militias were created for wartime mobilization. Soviet military schools, established during the civil war, began to graduate large numbers of trained officers loyal to the Soviet power. In an effort to increase the prestige of the military profession, the party reestablished formal military ranks, downgraded political commissars, and eventually established the principle of one-man command.

== Development of the structure, ideology, and doctrine of the Soviet military ==
=== Military counterintelligence ===
Throughout the history of the Soviet Army, the Soviet secret police (known variously as the Cheka, GPU, NKVD, among many others) maintained control over the counterintelligence Special Departments (Особый отдел) that existed at all larger military formations. The best known was SMERSH (1943–1946) created during the Great Patriotic War. While the staff of a Special Department of a regiment was generally known, it controlled a network of secret informants, both chekists and recruited ordinary military.

=== Political doctrine ===
Under the direction of Lenin and Trotsky, the Red Army claimed to adhere to Karl Marx's proclamation that the bourgeoisie could be overcome only by a worldwide revolt of the proletariat, and to this end early Soviet military doctrine focused on spreading the revolution abroad and expanding Soviet influence throughout the world. Lenin provided an early experiment of Marx's theory when he invaded Poland in hopes of generating a communist uprising in neighboring Germany. Lenin's Polish expedition only complemented his March 1919 establishment of the Comintern, an organization whose sole purpose was to fight "by all available means, including armed force, for the overthrow of the international bourgeoisie and for the creation of an international Soviet republic as a transition stage to the complete abolition of the State."

In keeping with the Comintern philosophy, the Red Army forcibly suppressed the anti-Soviet Basmachi Revolt in Central Asia in order to keep Turkestan in the Soviet alliance system. In 1921, a Red Army occupation of the Democratic Republic of Georgia overthrew the representative Georgian government and replaced it with a Soviet Republic. Georgia was then forcibly merged with Armenia and Azerbaijan in order to form the Transcaucasian SFSR, a member state of the Soviet Union.

=== Military-party relations ===
During the 1930s, Joseph Stalin's Five Year Plans and industrialization drive built the productive base necessary to modernize the Red Army. As the likelihood of war in Europe increased later in the decade, the Soviet Union tripled its military expenditures and doubled the size of its regular forces to match the power of its potential enemies.

In 1937, however, Stalin purged the Red Army of its best military leaders. Fearing that the military posed a threat to his rule, Stalin jailed or executed many Red Army officers, estimated in thousands, including three of five marshals. These actions were to severely impair the Red Army's capabilities in the Soviet–Finnish War (Winter War) of 1939–40 and in World War II.

Fearing the immense popularity of the armed forces after World War II, Stalin demoted war hero Marshal Georgy Zhukov and took personal credit for having saved the country. After Stalin's death in 1953, Zhukov reemerged as a strong supporter of Nikita Khrushchev. Khrushchev rewarded Zhukov by making him minister of defense and a full Politburo member. Concern that the Soviet army might become too powerful in politics, however, led to Zhukov's abrupt dismissal in the autumn of 1957. Khrushchev later alienated the armed forces by cutting defense expenditures on conventional forces in order to carry out his plans for economic reform.

Leonid Brezhnev's years in power marked the height of party-military cooperation as he provided ample resources to the armed forces. In 1973 the minister of defense became a full Politburo member for the first time since 1957. Yet Brezhnev evidently felt threatened by the professional military, and he sought to create an aura of military leadership around himself in an effort to establish his authority over the armed forces.

In the early 1980s, party-military relations became strained over the issue of resource allocations to the armed forces. Despite a downturn in economic growth, the armed forces argued, often to no avail, for more resources to develop advanced conventional weapons.

Mikhail Gorbachev downgraded the role of the military in state ceremonies, including moving military representatives to the end of the leadership line-up atop Lenin's Mausoleum during the annual Red Square military parade commemorating the October Revolution. Instead, Gorbachev emphasized civilian economic priorities and reasonable sufficiency in defense over the professional military's perceived requirements.

=== Military doctrine ===
The Russian army was defeated in the First World War, a fact which strongly shaped the early stages of Red Army development. While the armies of Britain and France were content to retain strategies which had made them victorious, the Red Army proceeded to experiment and develop new tactics and concepts, developing parallel to the reborn German armed forces. The Soviets viewed themselves as a nation unique to human history and thus felt no loyalty to previous military tradition, an ideology which allowed for and prioritized innovation.

From its conception, the Red Army committed itself to emphasizing highly mobile warfare. This decision was influenced by the formative wars of its history, namely the Russian Civil War and the Polish–Soviet War. Both of these conflicts had little in common with the static trench warfare of the First World War. Instead, they featured long range mobile operations, often by small but highly motivated forces, as well as rapid advances of hundreds of kilometers in a matter of days.

Under Lenin's New Economic Policy, the Soviet Union had few resources to devote to the Red Army during its formative years in the 1920s. This changed only when Stalin began the industrialisation drive in 1929, a policy created in part to allow for unprecedented funds to be dedicated to the military.

Using these new resources, the Red Army of the 1930s developed a highly sophisticated concept of mobile warfare which relied on huge formations of tanks, aircraft, and airborne troops designed to break through the enemy's line and carry the battle deep to the enemy's rear. Soviet industry responded, supplying tanks, aircraft and other equipment in sufficient numbers to make such operations practical. To avoid overestimating the power of the Soviet army, although before 1941 Soviet formations of a given level were at least equal to and often stronger than equivalent formations of other armies, huge wartime losses and reorganisation based on war experience reversed the trend during the later war years. Thus, for example, the Soviet Tank Corps was equivalent in armored vehicle power to an American armored division, and a Soviet rifle (infantry) division, unless specifically reinforced, was often equivalent to an American infantry regiment.

The Soviets developed their armament factories under the assumption that during the war they would have to rebuild the whole equipment of the ground and air forces many times over. This assumption was indeed proven correct during the four-year-long war.

The Red Army's focus on mobile operations in the early 1930s was gravely disrupted by Stalin's purge of the military's leadership. Since the new doctrines were associated with officers who had been declared enemies of the state, the support for them declined. Many large mechanised formations were disbanded, with the tanks distributed to support the infantry. After the German blitzkrieg proved its potency in Poland and France, the Red Army started a frantic effort to rebuild the large mechanised corps, but the task was only partly finished when the Wehrmacht attacked in 1941. The huge tank forces, powerful only on paper, were mostly annihilated by the Germans in the first months of Operation Barbarossa. Another factor contributing to the initial defeat was that the Soviet post-World War I rearmament effort was started too early, and in 1941 the majority of Soviet equipment was obsolete and inferior to that of the Wehrmacht.

In the initial period of the war, in the face of catastrophic losses, the Red Army drastically scaled down its armored formations, with the tank brigade becoming the largest commonly deployed armored unit, and reverted to a simpler mode of operations. Nevertheless, the revolutionary doctrines of the 1930s, modified by combat experience, were eventually successfully used at the front starting in 1943 after the Red Army regained the initiative.

== Practical deployment of the Soviet military ==
=== Interwar period ===
Joseph Stalin and Kliment Voroshilov depicted saluting a military parade in Red Square above the message "Long Live the Worker-Peasant Red Army—a Dependable Sentinel of the Soviet Borders!"

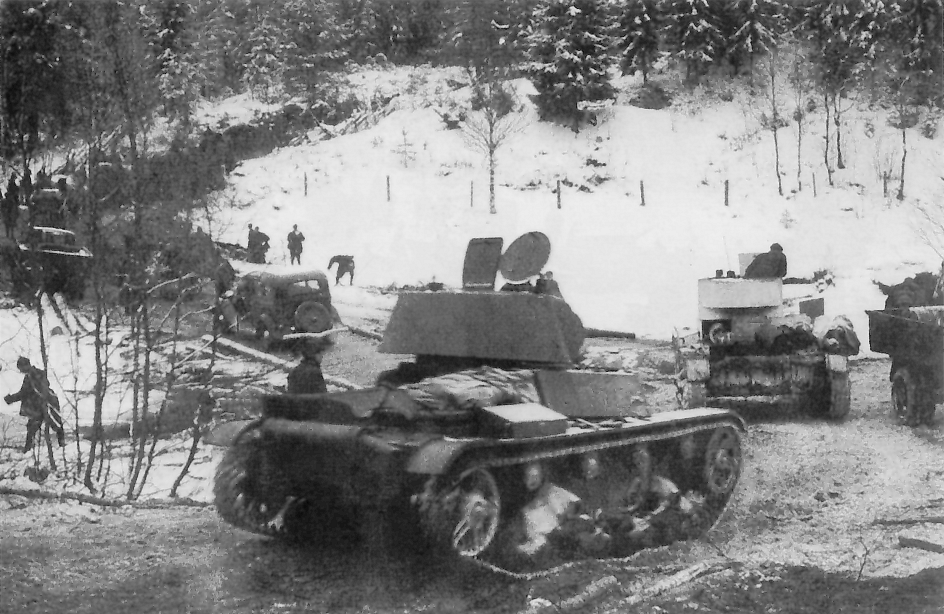
T-26 light tanks of the Soviet 7th Army during advance into Finland, 2 December 1939.

Following the death of Lenin, the Soviet Union was enmeshed in a struggle for succession that pitted Trotsky and his policy of "world revolution" against Stalin and his policy of "socialism in one country." Thanks to his control over and support from the Party and state bureaucracy, Stalin prevailed and Trotsky was removed as war commissar in 1925, resulting in a turn away from the policy of spreading the revolution abroad in favour of focusing on domestic issues and defending the country against the possibility of foreign invasion.

Eager to dispose of Trotsky's political and military supporters, Stalin directed the execution of eight high-ranking generals between 1935 and 1938. Primary among these was Marshal Mikhail Tukhachevsky, leader of the Soviet invasion of Poland.

Despite Stalin's isolationist policies, and even though the Soviet Union's borders would remain static for fifteen years following Lenin's death, the Soviets continued to involve themselves in international affairs, and the Comintern was instrumental in establishing the Communist parties of China in 1921 and Indochina in 1930. Additionally, the Red Army played a crucial role in the Spanish Civil War, supplying over 1,000 aircraft, 900 tanks, 1,500 artillery pieces, 300 armored cars, hundreds of thousands of small arms and 30,000 tons of ammunition to the Republican cause.

Soviet participation in the Spanish Civil War was greatly influenced by the growing tension between Stalin and Adolf Hitler, the leader of Nazi Germany and an avid supporter of the fascist forces of Francisco Franco. Nazi–Soviet relations were tempered by Hitler's personal hatred for communist ideology and for wanting to expand German territories. Direct armed conflict between Germany and the Soviet Union was delayed by the signing of the Molotov–Ribbentrop Pact on August 23, 1939, which essentially divided the nations of Eastern Europe into two spheres of interest, one belonging to the Soviets and the other to the Nazis.

The Soviet Union sold arms to the Governor of Xinjiang province of the Republic of China, Jin Shuren, and help install his successor Sheng Shicai in 1934 as their puppet governor. They intervened militarily in an invasion of Xinjiang against the Chinese Muslims 36th Division (National Revolutionary Army) and Han chinese troops led by the Chinese Muslim General Ma Zhongying and the Han chinese general Zhang Peiyuan when they were on the verge of defeating Sheng's manchurian and white Russian troops. 2 brigades of 7,000 men, armed with tanks, planes, mustard gas, and armored cars were the Soviet forces which invaded. After fierce fighting, in which mustard gas was used by the Soviet Union at the Battle of Tutung, Ma Zhongying retreated and Zhang committed suicide to avoid capture. During the battle, the chinese Muslims reportedly dressed up in sheepskins and stormed Soviet machine guns posts with swords. Ma encountered a Red Army column at the Battle of Dawan Cheng and wiped out the entire column, his Muslim troops rolled the wrecked Soviet armored cars off the mountainside. The Soviet Union intervened again in the Xinjiang War (1937), invading with 5,000 troops and using planes with mustard gas.

In late 1930s, Soviet Union was no longer satisfied with the status quo in its relations with independent countries of Finland, Estonia, Latvia, Lithuania, Poland and Romania. This came as a result of a change in Soviet foreign policy. The Molotov-Ribbentrop Pact gave a great opportunity to recover the provinces of Imperial Russia lost during the chaos of the October Revolution and the Russian Civil War. As a result of this pact, on 1 September, the Germans invaded Poland from the west. When the Poles were close to defeat and the Polish government left the country, on 17 September the Red Army invaded Poland from the east to regain the territories populated mostly by ethnic Belarusians and Ukrainians.

Next, Soviet Union sent ultimatums to the Baltic states and gained control in September and October. The Soviet Union had negotiated with the Finns for over a year, but the Finns refused Soviet demands. The Red Army launched the Winter War on November 30, 1939 with the goal of annexing Finland. Simultaneously, a puppet regime, called the Finnish Democratic Republic, was created by the Soviets. The initial period of the war proved disastrous for the Soviet military. Finnish victories in the Battle of Suomussalmi and the Battle of Raate Road thwarted Soviet attempts to reach Oulu and cut the country in half. Further south, the Soviets reached the Mannerheim Line, but staunch Finnish resistance prevented the Red Army from advancing past it, with the Soviets taking severe casualties in the process. The Soviet Union was expelled from the League of Nations on December 14, 1939.

On January 29, 1940, the Soviets put an end to their Finnish Democratic Republic puppet government and recognized the sitting government in Helsinki as the legal government of Finland, informing it that they were willing to negotiate peace. The Soviets reorganized their forces and launched a new offensive along the Karelian Isthmus in February 1940. Soviet forces broke through the Mannerheim Line and began progressing westward as Soviet peace proposals were given to the Finnish government. As fighting in Viipuri raged and the hope of foreign intervention faded, the Finns accepted peace terms on March 12, 1940 with the signing of the Moscow Peace Treaty. Fighting ended the following day. The Finns had retained their independence, but ceded 9% of Finnish territory to the Soviet Union.

=== World War II ===
Soviet ski troops advancing the front line during the siege of Leningrad.

The Molotov–Ribbentrop Pact of August 1939 established a non-aggression treaty between Nazi Germany and the Soviet Union with a secret protocol describing how Poland and the Baltic countries would be divided between them. In the invasion of Poland of 1939 the two powers invaded and partitioned Poland, and in June 1940 the Soviet Union also occupied Estonia, Latvia and Lithuania.

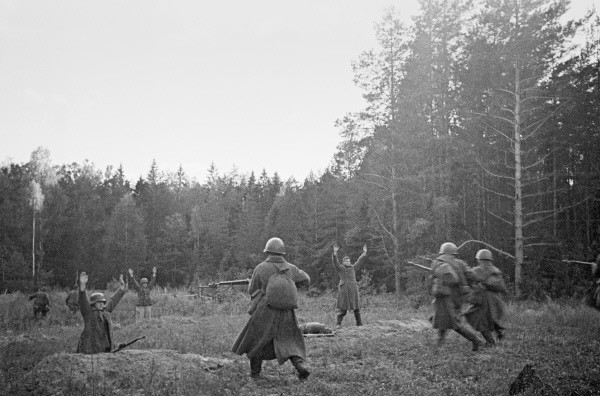
German soldiers surrendering to the Red Army units near Vitovka village, 1941.

The Red Army had little time to correct its numerous deficiencies before Nazi Germany and other Axis countries allied with it swept across the newly relocated Soviet border on June 22, 1941, in the opening stages of Operation Barbarossa. The poor Soviet performance in the Winter War against Finland encouraged Hitler to ignore the terms of the Molotov–Ribbentrop Pact and take the Red Army by surprise. During the initial stages of the war, Soviet forces were often ordered to stand their ground despite limited defensive capabilities, resulting in numerous encirclements and correspondingly high numbers of casualties.

The United States program of lend-lease was extended to Soviet Union in September 1941, supplying planes, tanks, trucks and other war materials. Eventually the Soviets managed to slow the Wehrmacht's blitzkrieg, halting the Nazi offensive in December 1941 outside the gates of Moscow, in part because mobilized troops with winterized clothing from Siberia were transferred from there after Stalin realized that Japan was not going to attack the Soviet Union (Japan had just attacked Pearl Harbor). The Red Army launched a powerful winter counteroffensive which pushed the Germans back from the outskirts of Moscow. At the start of 1942, the weakened Axis armies abandoned their march on Moscow and advanced south towards the Caucasus and Volga river. This offensive, in turn, ran out of steam in autumn 1942, allowing the Soviet forces to stage a devastating counteroffensive on the overextended enemy. The Red Army encircled and destroyed significant German forces at the Battle of Stalingrad, which ended in February 1943 and reversed the tide of the war in Europe.

In the summer of 1943, following the Battle of Kursk, the Red Army seized the strategic initiative for the remainder of the war. All Soviet territory was liberated from Axis occupation by 1944. After having driven the Axis armies out of Eastern Europe, in May 1945 the Red Army launched its assault on Berlin, which effectively ended World War II in Europe (see V-E Day). Much of Eastern Europe and great parts of the Soviet Union were devastated by Red Army troops as a result of an aggressive policy of "scorched earth". Once Germany had surrendered, the Red Army joined the war against Japan, and in summer 1945 carried out an offensive against Japanese forces stationed in northern Manchuria. The Red Army emerged from the war as one of the most powerful land armies in history with five million soldiers, and more tanks and artillery than all other countries combined.

The defeat of the Wehrmacht had come, however, at the cost of over eight million soldiers and as much as fifteen million civilians dead, by far the highest losses of any country during the war. This is believed to be the highest human death toll from any military conflict.

=== The Cold War and conventional forces ===
By the end of World War II, the Soviet Union had a standing army of 10 to 13 million men. During and right after the war, the Red Army was by far the most powerful land army in the world. Immediately following Germany's surrender, this number was reduced to five million; this decline was indicative not of diminishing interest in the Soviet military but rather of a growing interest in establishing more modern and mobile armed forces. This policy resulted in the 1949 introduction of the AK-47, designed two years earlier as an improvement on the submachine gun which supplied Soviet infantry with a rugged and reliable source of short-range firepower. Also important was the 1967 introduction of the BMP-1, the first mass-used infantry fighting vehicles commissioned by any armed force in the world. These innovations would help direct the course of Soviet military operations throughout the Cold War.

The Soviet military assisted the Second East Turkestan Republic during the Ili Rebellion.

The Mongolian People's Republic became involved in a border dispute with the Republic of China during the Pei-ta-shan Incident, Soviet Russian and Mongol forces attempted to occupy and raid Chinese territory, in response, a Chinese Muslim Hui cavalry regiment, the 14th Tungan Tungan Cavalry regiment was sent by the Chinese government to attack Mongol and Soviet positions.

Many of the Soviet forces who fought to liberate the countries of Eastern Europe from Nazi control remained in the region even after Germany's surrender in 1945. Stalin used this military occupation to establish satellite states, creating a buffer zone between Germany and the Soviet Union. The Soviets quickly became an enormous political and economic influence in the region and the Soviet Union actively assisted local communist parties in coming to power. By 1948, seven eastern European countries had communist governments.

In this setting, the Cold War emerged from a conflict between Stalin and U.S. President Harry S. Truman over the future of Eastern Europe during the Potsdam Conference in 1945. Truman charged that Stalin had betrayed the agreement made at the Yalta Conference. With Eastern Europe under Red Army occupation, the Soviet Union remained adamant in the face of Truman's attempt to stop Communist expansion, and in 1955 Moscow introduced the Warsaw Pact to counterbalance the Western NATO alliance.

Conventional military power showed its continued influence when the Soviet Union used its troops to invade Hungary in 1956 and Czechoslovakia in 1968 to suppress the democratic aspirations of their peoples and keep these countries within the Soviet regime. The Soviet Union and the western forces, led by the US, faced a number of standoffs that threatened to turn into live conflicts, such as the Berlin Blockade of 1948–49 and the Cuban Missile Crisis of 1962, which saw "hawks" on both sides push the respective rivals closer towards war due to policies of brinksmanship. This attitude was tempered by fears of a nuclear conflict and desires among moderates for détente.

Under Khrushchev's leadership, Soviet relations with Josip Broz Tito's Yugoslavia were finally repaired with the 1956 dissolution of the Cominform. This decision generated a further rift between the Soviet Union and the People's Republic of China, a neighboring communist state which felt the Soviets were turning their back on the fundamental Marxist–Leninist struggle for the worldwide triumph of communism. This Sino-Soviet split erupted in 1967 when the Red Guard besieged the Soviet embassy in Beijing. Additional conflicts along the Sino-Soviet border followed in 1969.

Tension between the political forces in Moscow and Beijing would greatly influence Asian politics during the 1960s and 1970s, and a microcosm of the Sino-Soviet split emerged when the by-then late-Ho Chi Minh's Soviet-aligned Vietnam invaded Pol Pot's pro-Chinese Cambodia in 1978. The Soviets had ensured the loyalty of Vietnam and Laos through an aggressive campaign of political, economic and military aid – the same tactic which allowed the Soviet Union to compete with the United States in a race to establish themselves as neocolonial rulers of newly independent states in Africa and the Middle East. Extensive arms sales made weapons like the AK-47 and the T-55 tank icons of the contemporary wars between Israel and its Arab neighbors.

Also significant was the 1968 declaration of the Brezhnev Doctrine which officially asserted the Soviet Union's right to intervene in other nation's internal affairs in order to secure socialism from opposing capitalist forces. This doctrine was used to justify the Soviet invasion of Afghanistan in 1979. In Afghanistan the Soviet forces met a fierce resistance from the Afghans who were supported by the CIA. Battling an opposition that relied on guerrilla tactics and asymmetric warfare, the massive Soviet war machine proved incapable of achieving decisive victories and the entire campaign quickly devolved into a quagmire not unlike that which the U.S. faced a decade earlier in the Vietnam War. After ten years of fighting at the cost of approximately 20 billion dollars a year (in 1986 United States dollars) and 15,000 Soviet casualties, Gorbachev surrendered to public opinion and ordered troops to withdraw in early 1989.

=== The Cold War and nuclear weapons ===
The Soviet Union tested their first atomic bomb codenamed "First Lightning" on 29 August 1949, four years after the atomic bombings of Hiroshima and Nagasaki, surprising many Western commentators who had expected the U.S. monopoly to last for some time longer. It soon came out that the Soviet atomic bomb project had received a considerable amount of espionage information about the wartime Manhattan Project, and that its first bomb was largely a purposeful copy of the U.S. "Fat Man" model. More important from the perspective of the speed of the Soviet program, the Soviets had developed more uranium reserves than specialists in the American military had thought possible. From the late 1940s, the Soviet armed forces focused on adapting to the Cold War in the era of nuclear arms by achieving parity with the United States in strategic nuclear weapons.

Though the Soviet Union had proposed various nuclear disarmament plans after the U.S. development of atomic weapons in the Second World War, the Cold War saw the Soviets in the process of developing and deploying nuclear weapons in full force. It would not be until the 1960s that the United States and the Soviet Union finally agreed to ban weapon buildups in Antarctica and nuclear weapons tests in the atmosphere, outer space, and underwater.

By the late 1960s, the Soviet Union had reached a rough parity with the United States in some categories of strategic weaponry, and at that time offered to negotiate limits on strategic nuclear weapons deployments. The Soviet Union wished to constrain U.S. deployment of an antiballistic missile (ABM) system and retain the ability to place multiple independently targetable re-entry vehicles (MIRVs).

The Strategic Arms Limitation Treaty began in November 1969 in Helsinki. The interim agreement signed in Moscow in May 1972 froze existing levels of deployment of intercontinental ballistic missiles (ICBMs) and regulated the growth of submarine-launched ballistic missiles (SLBMs). As part of the SALT process, the ABM Treaty was also signed.

The SALT agreements were generally considered in the West as having codified the concept of Mutually assured destruction (MAD), or deterrence. Both the U.S. and the Soviet Union recognized their mutual vulnerability to massive destruction, no matter which state launched nuclear weapons first. A second SALT agreement, SALT II, was signed in June 1979 in Vienna. Among other provisions, it placed an aggregate ceiling on ICBM and SLBM launchers. The second SALT agreement was never ratified by the United States Senate, in large part because of the breakdown of détente in the late 1970s and early 1980s.

At one time, the Soviet Union maintained the world's largest nuclear arsenal in history. According to estimates by the Natural Resources Defense Council, the peak of approximately 45,000 warheads was reached in 1986. Roughly 20,000 of these were believed to be tactical nuclear weapons, reflecting the Red Army doctrine that favored the use of these weapons if war came in Europe. The remainder (approximately 25,000) were strategic ICBMs. These weapons were considered both offensive and defensive in nature. The production of these weapons is one of the factors that led to the collapse of the Soviet Union.

== Military-industrial complex and the economy ==
With the notable exception of Khrushchev and possibly Gorbachev, Soviet leaders from the late 1920s onwards emphasized military production over investment in the civilian economy. The high priority given to military production traditionally enabled military-industrial enterprises to commandeer the best managers, labor, and materials from civilian plants. As a result, the Soviet Union produced some of the world's most advanced armaments. In the late 1980s, however, Gorbachev transferred some leading defense-industry officials to the civilian sector of the economy in an effort to make it as efficient as its military counterpart.

The integration of the party, government, and military in the Soviet Union became most evident in the area of defense-related industrial production. Gosplan, the state planning committee, had an important role in directing necessary supplies and resources to military industries. The Soviet Defense Council made decisions on the development and production of major weapons-systems. The Defense Industry Department of the Central Committee supervised all military industries as the executive agent of the Defense Council. Within the government, a Deputy Chairman of the Council of Ministers headed the Military Industrial Commission, which coordinated the activities of many industrial ministries, state committees, research-and-development organizations, and factories and enterprises that designed and produced arms and equipment for the armed forces.

In the late 1980s the Soviet Union devoted a quarter of its gross economic output to the defense sector (at the time most Western analysts put the figure at 15%). At the time, the military–industrial complex employed at least one of every five adults in the Soviet Union. In some regions of the Union of Soviet Socialist Republics, at least half of the workforce was employed in defense plants. (The comparable U.S. figures were roughly one-sixteenth of gross national product and about one of every sixteen in the workforce.) In 1989, one-fourth of the entire Soviet population was engaged in military activities, whether active duty, military production, or civilian military training.

== Collapse of the Soviet Union and the military ==
The political and economic chaos of the late 1980s and early 1990s soon erupted into the disintegration of the Warsaw Pact and the collapse of the Soviet Union. The political chaos and rapid economic liberalization, the infamous IMF shock therapy, had an enormously negative impact on the strength and funding of the military. In 1985, the Soviet military had about 5.3 million men; by 1990 the number declined to about four million. At the time the Soviet Union dissolved, the residual forces belonging to the Russian Federation were 2.7 million strong. Almost all of this drop occurred in a three-year period between 1989 and 1991.

The first contribution to this was a large unilateral reduction which began with an announcement by Gorbachev in December 1988; these reductions continued as a result of the collapse of the Warsaw Pact and in accordance with Conventional Forces in Europe (CFE) treaties. The second reason for the decline was the widespread resistance to conscription which developed as the policy of glasnost revealed to the public the true conditions inside the Soviet army and the widespread abuse of conscript soldiers.

As the Soviet Union moved towards disintegration in 1991, the huge Soviet military played a surprisingly feeble and ineffective role in propping up the dying Soviet system. The military got involved in trying to suppress conflicts and unrest in Central Asia and the Caucasus, but it often proved incapable of restoring peace and order. On April 9, 1989, the army, together with MVD units, killed 20 demonstrators in Tbilisi in Georgia. The next major crisis occurred in Azerbaijan, when the Soviet army forcibly entered Baku on January 19–20, 1990, resulting in the death of 137 people. On January 13, 1991 Soviet forces stormed the State Radio and Television Building and the television retranslation tower in Vilnius, Lithuania, both under opposition control, killing 14 people and injuring 700. This action was perceived by many as heavy-handed and achieved little.

At the crucial moments of the August Coup, arguably the last attempt by the Soviet hardliners to prevent the breakup of the state, some military units did enter Moscow to act against Boris Yeltsin but ultimately refused to crush the protesters surrounding the Russian parliament building. In effect, the leadership of the Soviet military decided to side with Gorbachev and Yeltsin, and thus finally doomed the old order.

As the Soviet Union officially dissolved on December 31, 1991, the Soviet military was left in limbo. For the next year and a half various attempts to keep its unity and transform it into the military of the Commonwealth of Independent States (CIS) failed. Steadily, the units stationed in Ukraine and some other breakaway republics swore loyalty to their new national governments, while a series of treaties between the newly independent states divided up the military's assets. In mid-March 1992, Yeltsin appointed himself as the new Russian minister of defence, marking a crucial step in the creation of the new Russian armed forces, comprising the bulk of what was still left of the military. The last vestiges of the old Soviet command structure were finally dissolved in June 1993.

In the next few years, Russian forces withdrew from central and eastern Europe, as well as from some newly independent post-Soviet republics. While in most places the withdrawal took place without any problems, the Russian army remained in some disputed areas such as the Sevastopol naval base in the Crimea as well as in Abkhazia and Transnistria.

The loss of recruits and industrial capacity in breakaway republics, as well as the breakdown of the Russian economy, caused a devastating decline in the capacity of post-Soviet Russian armed forces in the decade following 1992.

Most of the nuclear stockpile was inherited by Russia. Additional weapons were acquired by Ukraine, Belarus and Kazakhstan. Amid fears of nuclear proliferation, these were all certified as transferred to Russia by 1996. Uzbekistan is another former Soviet republic where nuclear weapons may once have been stationed, but they are now signatories of the Nuclear non-proliferation treaty.

== Timeline ==
Date	Conflict	Location	Outcome
1918–20	Russian Civil War	Russian SFSR	The newly founded Red Army defeated the White movement and their foreign allies.
1919–21	Polish–Soviet War	Belarus, Second Polish Republic, Ukraine	The Soviets were defeated after preliminary successes and conceded Western Ukraine and Western Belarus to Poland, while retaining Eastern Ukraine and Eastern Belarus.
1921	Red Army invasion of Georgia	Democratic Republic of Georgia	Soviet rule was established in Georgia
1924	August Uprising in Georgia	Georgian SSR	Last major rebellion against Bolsheviks in Georgia was put down by the Red Army.
1929	Sino-Soviet conflict (1929)	Manchuria	Minor armed conflict between the Soviet Union and Chinese warlord Zhang Xueliang of the Republic of China over the Manchurian Chinese Eastern Railway. The Red Army defeated the Chinese and compelled them to uphold the provisions of the Agreement of 1924.
1934	Soviet Invasion of Xinjiang	Xinjiang	Red Army and GPU troops attacked the Chinese Muslim 36th Division (National Revolutionary Army) and Han chinese Ili troops led by Generals Ma Zhongying and Zhang Peiyuan. Military stalemate.
1937	Xinjiang War (1937)	Xinjiang	Red Army troops assisted the provincial government of Xinjiang led by Sheng Shicai in fighting Uyghur rebels.
1938	Battle of Lake Khasan	Korea–USSR Border	The Soviets repelled the Japanese incursion.
1939	Battles of Khalkhin Gol	Manchuria–Mongolia Border	The Soviets defeated the Japanese Kwantung Army and retained their existing border with Manchukuo.
1939	Invasion of Poland and Bessarabia (World War II)	Poland, Belarus, Romania	Nazi Germany and the Soviet Union divided Eastern Europe according to the terms of the Molotov–Ribbentrop Pact.
1939–40	Winter War (World War II)	Finland	The Soviets failed to conquer Finland and suffered heavy casualties and material losses, but annexed 9% of Finnish territory in the ensuing peace treaty. The USSR was expelled from the League of Nations as a result of the war.
1941–45	Eastern Front (WWII) (World War II)	Soviet Union, Nazi Germany, Eastern Europe	In a titanic struggle against Nazi Germany, the Red Army defeated the Wehrmacht and occupied most of Eastern and Central Europe.
1941–44	Continuation War (World War II)	Finland	Soviet forces defeated Finland, procuring additional territory and Finland withdrew from World War II.
1944–49	Ili Rebellion	Xinjiang, Republic of China	Red Army troops and Republic of China troops clashed in Xinjiang over Soviet support for the Second East Turkestan Republic. A Chinese Muslim unit loyal to the Chinese government, the 14th Tungan Cavalry regiment fought against Soviet forces on the Mongolian border.
1945–74	Forest Brothers	Estonia, Latvia, Lithuania	Thousands of Baltic "forest brothers" waged a war of resistance against Soviet administration. Major fighting ended in late 1940s and early 1950s, with the defeat and disintegration of the 'forest brothers'. The last partisan, an Estonian, was killed in 1974.
1945	Soviet invasion of Manchuria (World War II)	Manchuria	The Red Army launched a short and successful campaign to evict the Japanese from mainland Asia. The Soviets occupied Manchuria, North Korea and the Kuril Islands.
1947–91	Cold War	Worldwide, opposing the United States and the NATO	Nuclear war was frequently threatened, but never realized. In 1955, the Soviet Union established the Warsaw Pact in response to the creation of NATO in 1948.
1948–49	Berlin Blockade	Berlin	The first of many Cold War standoffs as the Soviet Union sealed Berlin from outside access. The US responded with the Berlin Airlift and the blockade was eventually called off.
1956	1956 Hungarian Revolution	Hungary	The Red Army suppressed a Hungarian anti-Soviet revolt.
1962	Cuban Missile Crisis	Cuba	Another Cold War standoff over US deployment of nuclear missiles in Turkey and Italy, and subsequent Soviet deployment of nuclear missiles in Cuba. The Soviets agreed to withdraw the missiles after a U.S. guarantee not to invade Cuba and to withdraw nuclear missiles from Turkey.
1968	Prague Spring	Czechoslovakia	An invasion by the Warsaw Pact quietened a national movement for a more liberal Czech government.
1969	Sino-Soviet border conflict	Sino-Soviet border	A long-standing ideological feud between the Soviet Union and the People's Republic of China erupted into several occasions of inconclusive armed conflicts. The Soviets repelled the Chinese incursion into the Zhenbao/Damansky island.
1979–89	Soviet intervention in the Afghan Civil War	Afghanistan	Soviet military intervention in Afghanistan quickly devolved into a quagmire. Troops were withdrawn after ten years of an indecisive "shooting war", in which the U.S., China, Pakistan and Saudi Arabia funded and armed the Afghan Mujahideen.

== Foreign military aid ==
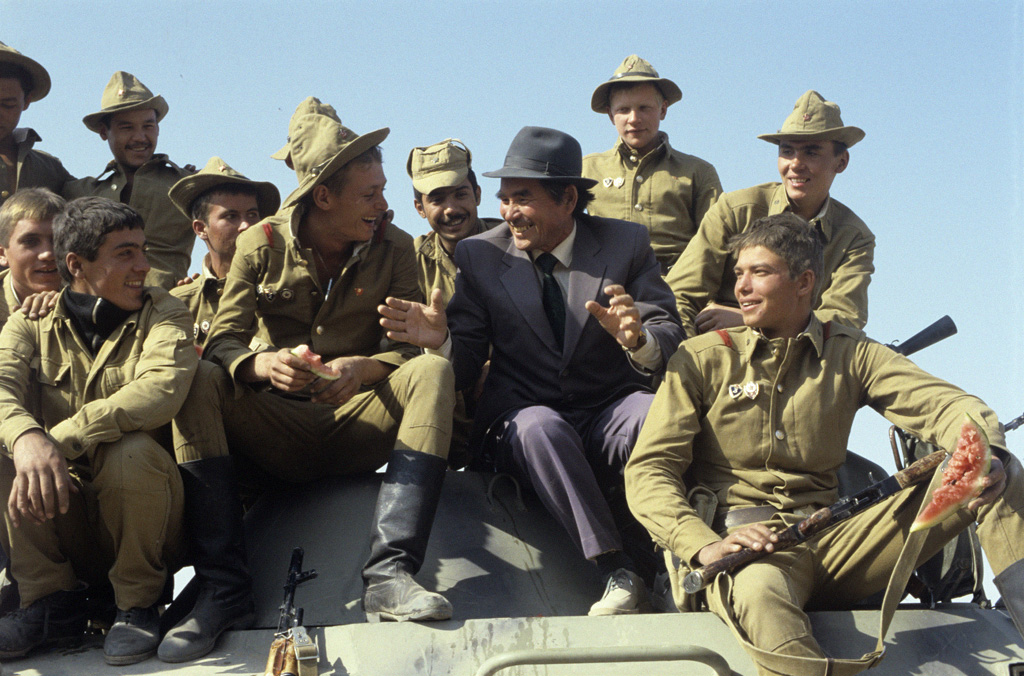
Soviet soldiers returning from Afghanistan. 20 October 1986, Kushka, Turkmenia.

In addition to explicit wars, the Soviet military took part in a number of internal conflicts in various countries, as well as proxy wars between third countries as a means of advancing their strategic interests while avoiding direct conflict between the superpowers in the nuclear age (or, in the case of the Spanish Civil War, avoiding a direct conflict with Nazi Germany at a time when neither side was prepared for such a war). In many cases, involvement was in the form of military advisors as well as the sale or provision of weapons.

Date	Benefactor
1936–39	Spain
1933–34, 1937–39	Republic of China
1939	Mongolia
1945–49, 1950–53	People's Republic of China
1950–53	North Korea
1961–74	North Vietnam
1962–64	Algeria
1962–63, 1967–75	Egypt
1962–63, 1969–76	Yemen
1967, 1970, 1972–73, 1982	Syria
1971	India
1975–79	Angola
1967–69, 1975–79	Mozambique
1977–79	Ethiopia
1960–70	Laos
1980–91	Iraq
1982	Lebanon

== See also ==
- Military history of Russia
- List of military aircraft of the Soviet Union and the CIS
- Missiles of Russia and the USSR
- List of Soviet tanks
- Russia involvement in regime change
- Timeline of Russian inventions and technology records
