= German–Soviet Commercial Agreement (disambiguation) =

German–Soviet Commercial Agreement can refer to several agreements between Nazi Germany and the Soviet Union:

- German–Soviet Credit Agreement (1939), August 19, 1939
- German–Soviet Commercial Agreement (1940), February 11, 1940
- German–Soviet Border and Commercial Agreement (1941), January 10, 1941
