= Battle of Dawan Cheng =

1934 battle of the Soviet invasion of Xinjiang

- Part of the Soviet Invasion of Xinjiang
Date	1934
Location	Dawan Cheng, Xinjiang
Result	Chinese tactical victory: Chinese withdrawal; Soviet column destroyed

Belligerents
(Taiwan) China	Soviet Union (Russian Empire) White Russian forces

Commanders and leaders
(Taiwan) Gen. Ma Zhongying	(Soviet Union) Gen. Volgin (Russian Empire) Gen. Bekteev

Strength
Hundreds of soldiers	Dozens of armored cars and hundreds of soldiers

Casualties and losses
Unknown	Heavy, entire column nearly wiped out

The Battle of Dawan Cheng (Chinese: 達坂城之戰) of 1934 occurred when Gen. Ma Zhongying's Chinese Muslim New 36th Division encountered a Soviet Russian Army armoured car column. The New 36th Division was withdrawing, chased by White Russian and Mongol troops and Chinese forces allied with them. The New 36th Division wiped out nearly the entire column, after engaging the Russians in fierce, sometimes hand-to-hand combat, and knocked the wrecked Russian armored cars down the mountain. When a White Russian force showed up, Ma Zhongying withdrew.
