= History of Kashgar =

The history of Kashgar begins in the first millennium BC, when the tribes of Yuezhi, Usuns and Sakas were roaming around the vast expanses of the Taklamakan Desert and the piedmont slopes of the Pamir. Wandering from one encampment to another in the oases, they eventually began founding small settlements, which later were developed into cities on the Silk Road.

Timeline of Kashgar
Year	City name	Dynasty	Notes
≈ 2nd cent. BC	Shule	Shule Kingdom	(Note: Capital of the Shule Kingdom.)
≈ 177 BC	Shule	Xiongnu	
60 BC	Shule	Western Han dynasty	(Note: During the Eastern Han dynasty, Shule was administered by the Protectorate of the Western Regions.)
1st cent. AD	Shule	Xiongnu, Yuezhi	
74	Shule	Eastern Han dynasty	
107	Shule	Northern Xiongnu	
127	Shule	Eastern Han dynasty	
150	Shule	Kushan	
323	Shule	Kucha, Rouran	
384	Shule	Former Qin	
≈450	Shule	Hephthalite Empire	
492	Shule	Gaoche	
≈504	Shule	Hephthalite Empire	
≈552	Shule	First Turkic Khaganate,	
≈583	Shule	Western Turkic Khaganate,	
648	Shule	Tang dynasty	
651	Shule	Western Turkic Khaganate,	
658	Shule	Tang dynasty	
670	Shule	Tibetan Empire	
679	Shule	Tang dynasty	
686	Shule	Tibetan Empire	
692	Shule	Tang dynasty	
790	Shule	Tibetan Empire	
791	Shule	Uyghur Khaganate	
840	Kashgar	Kara-Khanid Khanate	
893	Kashgar	Kara-Khanid Khanate	
1041	Kashgar	Eastern Karakhanid	
1134	Kashgar	Karakhitai Khanate (Western Liao dynasty)	
1215	Kashgar	Karakhitai Khanate (Western Liao dynasty)	
1218	Kashgar	Mongol Empire	
1266	Kashgar	Chagatai Khanate	
1348	Kashgar	Moghulistan (Eastern Chagatay)	
1387	Kashgar	Moghulistan (Eastern Chagatay)	
1392	Kashgar	Timurid dynasty	
1432	Kashgar	Chagatay	
1466	Kashgar	Dughlats	
1514	Kashgar	Yarkent Khanate	
1697	Kashgar	Dzungar Khanate	
1759	Kashgar	Qing dynasty	
1865	Kashgar	Emirate of Kashgaria	
1877	Kashgar	Qing dynasty	
1913	Kashgar	Republic of China	
1933	Kashgar	East Turkestan Republic	
1934	Kashgar	Republic of China	
1949- present	Kashi	China	
Capital of an independent political entity

== Iranian period ==
Archaeological and anthropological evidence shows that before the arrival of Turks, the region was primarily populated by Indo-European speakers of the Iranian branch. The old inhabitants of the region were the Iranian Saka. The Khotanese Saka language is a variety of Eastern Iranian languages, attested from the ancient Buddhist kingdoms of Khotan, Kashgar and Tumshuq in the Tarim Basin, in what is now southern Xinjiang. It is a Middle Iranian language. The two kingdoms differed in dialect, their speech known as Khotanese and Tumshuqese.

The nomadic people of Central Asia, known to the Chinese as the Sai (or Saka), migrated to the Tarim Basin and formed the kingdom of Khotan. They were likely the same group known as Sakas to Persians, Greeks, and Indians. Iranian Saka tribes established several states, including Hsiu-hsün and Chüan-du northwest of Kashgar. Documents in Saka language dating from the 7th to 10th centuries have been found in Khotan and Tumshuq, suggesting the prevalence of Saka dialects in the region.

Additionally, the Tibetans referred to Kashgar as 'Ga-hjag', similar to the name of a language (Kanchaki) spoken near Kashgar in the 11th century. This further supports the idea that the Kashgar area was also home to a Saka dialect.

The indigenous name of the city was probably Kāš, to which the East Iranian -γar (‘mountain’) was attached. In the early 3rd century, Kashgar became a major power center in the "Western Regions". However, by the mid-3rd century, as per an inscription by Shapur I, Kashgar was likely the easternmost point of the Persian Sasanian Empire. Chinese records from the 4th to 6th centuries describe Kashgar as a wealthy region with numerous large cities.

The ruler of Kāš in the late 8th century, according to the Middle Persian Manichean text Mahrnāmag (Müller, lines 75-76), was called xšy∂ (‘ruler’ in Sogdian), with the title “Head of Auditors” and the name lyfwtwšy, which is possibly Chinese.

By the 6th century, it was under Hephthalite rule and later fell under the control of the First Turkish Kaghanate.

== Han dynasty ==
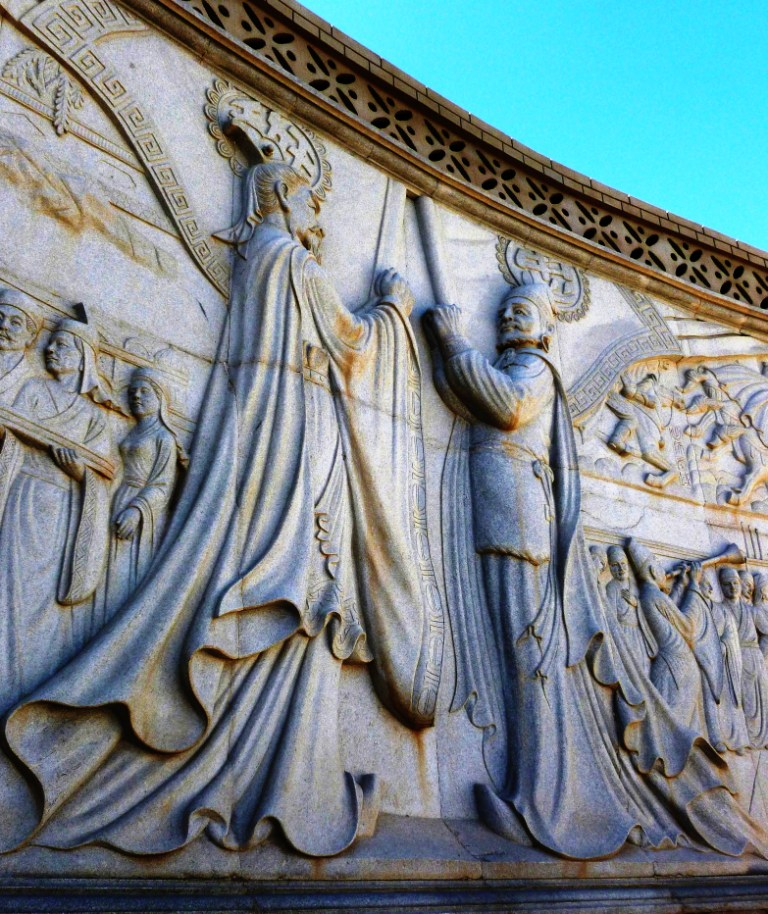
Relief with Ban Chao and King Yule (Zhong) of Kashgar in 73 CE

The earliest mention of Kashgar occurs when a Chinese Han dynasty envoy traveled the Northern Silk Road to explore lands to the west.

Another early mention of Kashgar is during the Former Han (also known as the Western Han dynasty), when in 76 BCE the Chinese conquered the Xiongnu, Yutian (Hotan), Sulei (Kashgar), and a group of states in the Tarim Basin almost up to the foot of the Tian Shan range.

Ptolemy speaks of Scythia beyond the Imaus, which is in a “Kasia Regio”, probably exhibiting the name from which Kashgar and Kashgaria (often applied to the district) are formed. The country's people practised Zoroastrianism and Buddhism before the coming of Islam.

In the Book of Han, which covers the period between 125 BCE and 23 CE, it is recorded that there were 1,510 households, 18,647 people and 2,000 persons able to bear arms. By the time covered by the Book of the Later Han (roughly 25 to 170 CE), it had grown to 21,000 households and had 3,000 men able to bear arms.

The Book of the Later Han provides a wealth of detail on developments in the region:

In the period of Emperor Wu [140-87 BC], the Western Regions1 were under the control of the Interior [China]. They numbered thirty-six kingdoms. The Imperial Government established a Colonel [in charge of] Envoys there to direct and protect these countries. Emperor Xuan [73-49 BC] changed this title [in 59 BC] to Protector-General.

Emperor Yuan [40–33 BC] installed two Wuji Colonels to take charge of the agricultural garrisons on the frontiers of the king of Nearer Jushi [Turpan].

During the time of Emperor Ai [6 BCE – 1 CE] and Emperor Ping [1–5 CE], the principalities of the Western Regions split up and formed fifty-five kingdoms. Wang Mang, after he usurped the Throne [in 9 CE], demoted and changed their kings and marquises. Following this, the Western Regions became resentful and rebelled. They, therefore, broke off all relations with the Interior [China] and, all together, submitted to the Xiongnu again.

The Xiongnu collected oppressively heavy taxes and the kingdoms were not able to support their demands. In the middle of the Jianwu period [AD 25-56], they each [Shanshan and Yarkand in 38 and 18 kingdoms in 45], sent envoys to ask if they could submit to the Interior [China] and to express their desire for a Protector-General. Emperor Guangwu, decided that because the Empire was not yet settled [after a long period of civil war], he had no time for outside affairs and [therefore] finally refused his consent [in 45 CE].

In the meantime, the Xiongnu became weaker. The king of Suoju [Yarkand], named Xian, wiped out several kingdoms. After Xian’s death [c. 62 CE], they began to attack and fight each other. Xiao Yuan [Tura], Jingjue [Cadota], Ronglu [Niya] and Qiemo [Cherchen] were annexed by Shanshan [the Lop Nur region]. Qule [south of Keriya] and Pishan [modern Pishan or Guma] were conquered and fully occupied by Yutian [Khotan]. Yuli [Fukang], Danhuan, Guhu [Dawan Cheng] and Wutanzili were destroyed by Jushi [Turpan and Jimasa]. Later these kingdoms were re-established.

During the Yongping period [58–75 CE], the Northern Xiongnu forced several countries to help them plunder the commanderies and districts of Hexi. The gates of the towns stayed shut in broad daylight."

More particularly, in reference to Kashgar itself, is the following record:

In the sixteenth Yongping year of Emperor Ming 73, Jian, the king of Qiuci (Kucha), attacked and killed Cheng, the king of Shule (Kashgar). Then he appointed the Qiuci (Kucha) Marquis of the Left, Douti, King of Shule (Kashgar). In winter 73 CE, the Han sent the Major Ban Chao who captured and bound Douti. He appointed Zhong, the son of the elder brother of Cheng, to be king of Shule (Kashgar). Zhong later rebelled. (Ban) Chao attacked and beheaded him.

== The Kushans ==
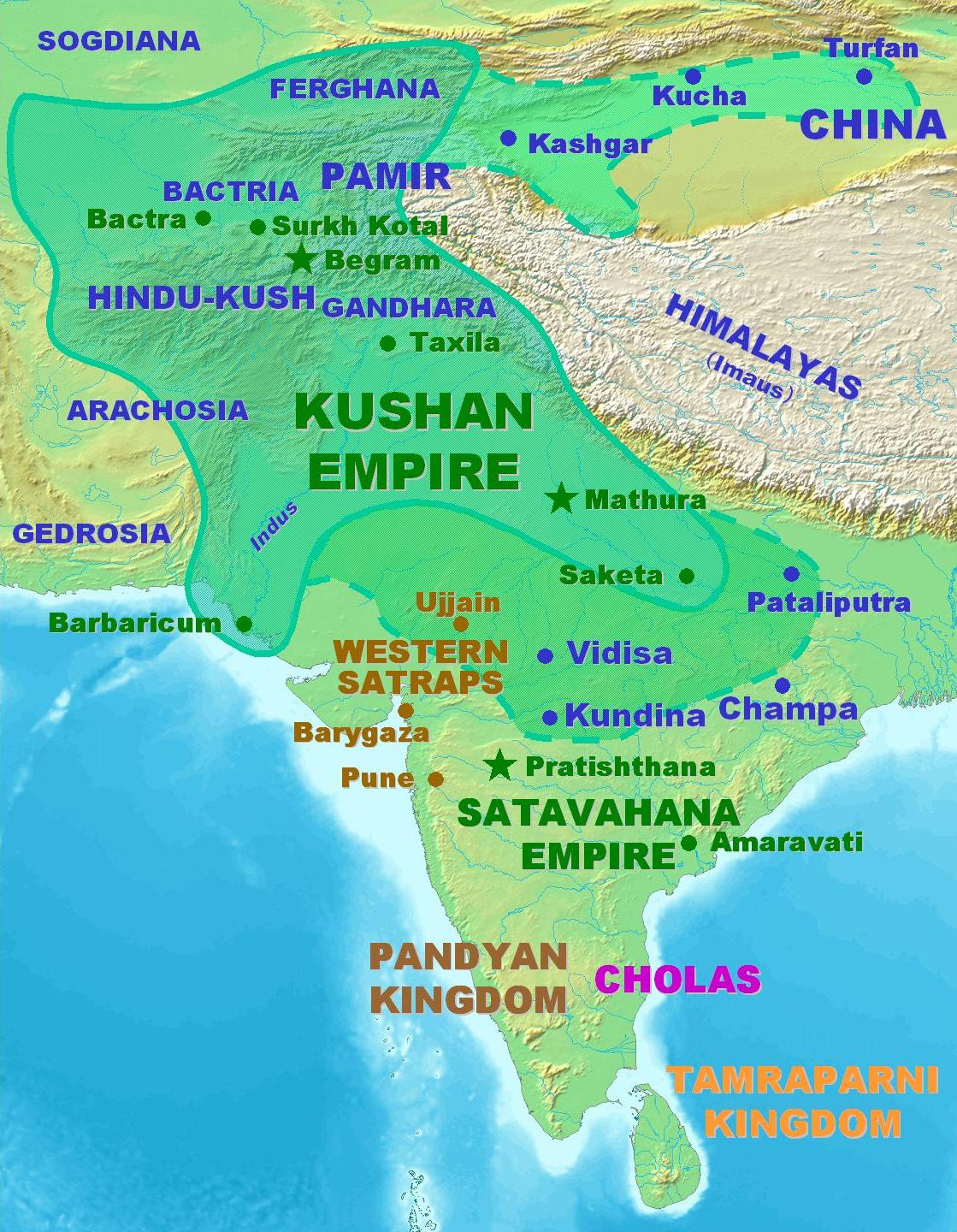
Kashgar in the Kushan Empire under Kanishka the Great

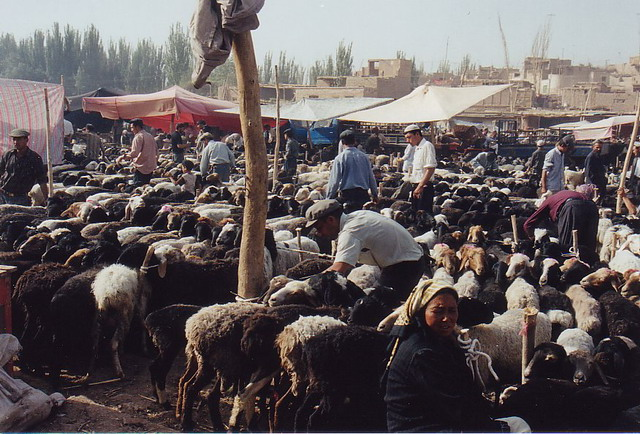
Kashgar's Sunday market.

The Book of the Later Han also gives the only extant historical record of Yuezhi or Kushan involvement in the Kashgar oasis:

During the Yuanchu period (114–120) in the reign of Emperor, the king of Shule (Kashgar), exiled his maternal uncle Chenpan to the Yuezhi (Kushans) for some offence. The king of the Yuezhi became very fond of him. Later, Anguo died without leaving a son. His mother directed the government of the kingdom. She agreed with the people of the country to put Yifu (lit. “posthumous child”), who was the son of a full younger brother of Chenpan on the throne as king of Shule (Kashgar). Chenpan heard of this and appealed to the Yuezhi (Kushan) king, saying:

"Anguo had no son. His relative (Yifu) is weak. If one wants to put on the throne a member of (Anguo’s) mother’s family, I am Yifu’s paternal uncle, it is I who should be king."

The Yuezhi (Kushans) then sent soldiers to escort him back to Shule (Kashgar). The people had previously respected and been fond of Chenpan. Besides, they dreaded the Yuezhi (Kushans). They immediately took the seal and ribbon from Yifu and went to Chenpan, and made him king. Yifu was given the title of Marquis of the town of Pangao [90 li, or 37 km, from Shule].

Then Suoju (Yarkand) continued to resist Yutian (Hotan), and put themselves under Shule (Kashgar). Thus Shule (Kashgar), became powerful and a rival to Qiuci (Kucha) and Yutian (Khotan)."

However, it was not very long before the Chinese began to reassert their authority in the region:

In the second Yongjian year (127), during Emperor Shun's reign, Chenpan sent an envoy to respectfully present offerings. The Emperor bestowed on Chenpan the title of Great Commandant-in-Chief for the Han. Chenxun, who was the son of his elder brother, was appointed Temporary Major of the Kingdom. In the fifth year (130), Chenpan sent his son to serve the Emperor and, along with envoys from Dayuan (Ferghana) and Suoju (Yarkand), brought tribute and offerings.

From an earlier part of the same text comes the following addition:

In the first Yangjia year (132), Xu You sent the king of Shule (Kashgar), Chenpan, who with 20,000 men, attacked and defeated Yutian (Khotan). He beheaded several hundred people, and released his soldiers to plunder freely. He replaced the king [of Jumi] by installing Chengguo from the family of [the previous king] Xing, and then he returned.

Then the first passage continues:

In the second Yangjia year (133), Chenpan again made offerings (including) a lion and zebu cattle.

Then, during Emperor Ling’s reign, in the first Jianning year [168], the king of Shule (Kashgar) and Commandant-in-Chief for the Han (i.e. presumably Chenpan), was killed while hunting by the youngest of his paternal uncles, Hede. Hede named himself king.

In the third year (170), Meng Tuo, the Inspector of Liangzhou, sent the Provincial Officer Ren She, commanding five hundred soldiers from Dunhuang, with the Wuji Major Cao Kuan, and Chief Clerk of the Western Regions, Zhang Yan, brought troops from Yanqi (Karashahr), Qiuci (Kucha), and the Nearer and Further States of Jushi (Turpan and Jimasa), altogether numbering more than 30,000, to punish Shule (Kashgar). They attacked the town of Zhenzhong [Arach − near Maralbashi] but, having stayed for more than forty days without being able to subdue it, they withdrew. Following this, the kings of Shule (Kashgar) killed one another repeatedly while the Imperial Government was unable to prevent it.

== Three Kingdoms to the Sui dynasty ==
These centuries are marked by a general silence in sources on Kashgar and the Tarim Basin.

The Weilüe, composed in the second third of the 3rd century, mentions a number of states as dependencies of Kashgar: the kingdom of Zhenzhong (Arach?), the kingdom of Suoju (Yarkand), the kingdom of Jieshi, the kingdom of Qusha, the kingdom of Xiye (Khargalik), the kingdom of Yinai (Tashkurghan), the kingdom of Manli (modern Karasul), the kingdom of Yire (Mazar − also known as Tágh Nák and Tokanak), the kingdom of Yuling, the kingdom of Juandu (‘Tax Control’ − near modern Irkeshtam), the kingdom of Xiuxiu (‘Excellent Rest Stop’ − near Karakavak), and the kingdom of Qin.

However, much of the information on the Western Regions contained in the Weilüe seems to have ended roughly about (170), near the end of Han power. So, we cannot be sure that this is a reference to the state of affairs during the Cao Wei (220–265), or whether it refers to the situation before the civil war during the Later Han when China lost touch with most foreign countries and came to be divided into three separate kingdoms.

Chapter 30 of the Records of the Three Kingdoms says that after the beginning of the Wei dynasty (220) the states of the Western Regions did not arrive as before, except for the larger ones such as Kucha, Khotan, Kangju, Wusun, Kashgar, Yuezhi, Shanshan and Turpan, who are said to have come to present tribute every year, as in Han times.

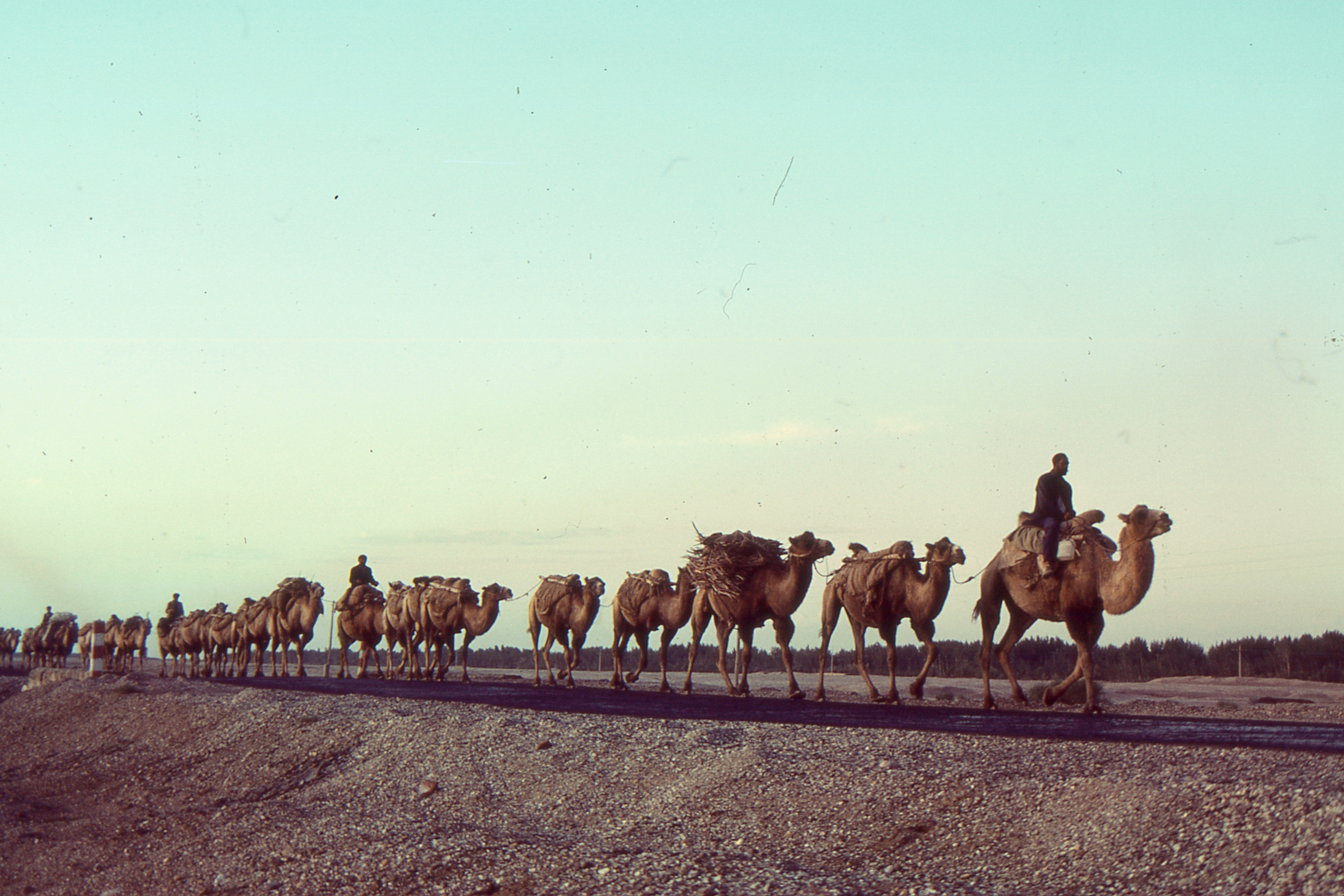
Camels traversing the old Silk Road in 1992

In 270, four states from the Western Regions were said to have presented tribute: Karashahr, Turpan, Shanshan, and Kucha. Some wooden documents from Niya seem to indicate that contacts were also maintained with Kashgar and Khotan around this time.

In 422, according to the Songshu, ch. 98, the king of Shanshan, Bilong, came to the court and "the thirty-six states in the Western Regions" all swore their allegiance and presented tribute. It must be assumed that these 36 states included Kashgar.

The "Songji" of the Zizhi Tongjian records that in the 5th month of 435, nine states: Kucha, Kashgar, Wusun, Yueban, Tashkurghan, Shanshan, Karashahr, Turpan and Sute all came to the Wei court.

In 439, according to the Weishu, ch. 4A, Shanshan, Kashgar and Karashahr sent envoys to present tribute.

According to the Weishu, ch. 102, Chapter on the Western Regions, the kingdoms of Kucha, Kashgar, Wusun, Yueban, Tashkurghan, Shanshan, Karashahr, Turpan and Sute all began sending envoys to present tribute in the Taiyuan reign period (435–440).

In 453 Kashgar sent envoys to present tribute (Weishu, ch. 5), and again in 455.

An embassy sent during the reign of Wencheng Di (452–466) from the king of Kashgar presented a supposed sacred relic of the Buddha; a dress which was incombustible.

In 507 Kashgar, is said to have sent envoys in both the 9th and 10th months (Weishu, ch. 8).

In 512, Kashgar sent envoys in the 1st and 5th months. (Weishu, ch. 8).

Early in the 6th century Kashgar is included among the many territories controlled by the Yeda or Hephthalite Huns, but their empire collapsed at the onslaught of the Western Turks between 563 and 567 who then probably gained control over Kashgar and most of the states in the Tarim Basin.

== Tang dynasty ==
The founding of the Tang dynasty in 618 saw the beginning of a prolonged struggle between China and the Western Turks for control of the Tarim Basin. In 635, the Tang Annals reported an emissary from the king of Kashgar to the Tang capital. In 639 there was a second emissary bringing products of Kashgar as a token of submission to the Tang state.

Buddhist scholar Xuanzang passed through Kashgar (which he referred to as Ka-sha) in 644 on his return journey from Indi] to China. The Buddhist religion, then beginning to decay in India, was active in Kashgar. Xuanzang recorded that they flattened their babies heads, tattooed their bodies and had green eyes. He reported that Kashgar had abundant crops, fruits and flowers, wove fine woolen stuffs and rugs. Their writing system had been adapted from Indian script but their language was different from that of other countries. The inhabitants were sincere Buddhist adherents and there were some hundreds of monasteries with more than 10,000 followers, all members of the Sarvastivadin School.

At around the same era, Nestorian Christians were establishing bishoprics at Herat, Merv and Samarkand, whence they subsequently proceeded to Kashgar, and finally to China proper itself.

In 646, the Turkic Kagan asked for the hand of a Tang Chinese princess, and in return the Emperor promised Kucha, Khotan, Kashgar, Karashahr and Sarikol as a marriage gift, but this did not happen as planned.

In a series of campaigns between 652 and 658, with the help of the Uyghurs, the Chinese finally defeated the Western Turk tribes and took control of all their domains, including the Tarim Basin kingdoms. Karakhoja was annexed in 640, Karashahr during campaigns in 644 and 648, and Kucha fell in 648.

In 662 a rebellion broke out in the Western Regions and a Chinese army sent to control it was defeated by the Tibetans south of Kashgar.

After another defeat of the Tang Chinese forces in 670, the Tibetans gained control of the whole region and completely subjugated Kashgar in 676–678 and retained possession of it until 692, when the Tang dynasty regained control of all their former territories, and retained it for the next fifty years.

In 722 Kashgar sent 4,000 troops to assist the Chinese to force the "Tibetans out of "Little Bolu" or Gilgit.

In 728, the king of Kashgar was awarded a brevet by the Chinese emperor.

In 739, the Tangshu relates that the governor of the Chinese garrison in Kashgar, with the help of Ferghana, was interfering in the affairs of the Turgesh tribes as far as Talas.

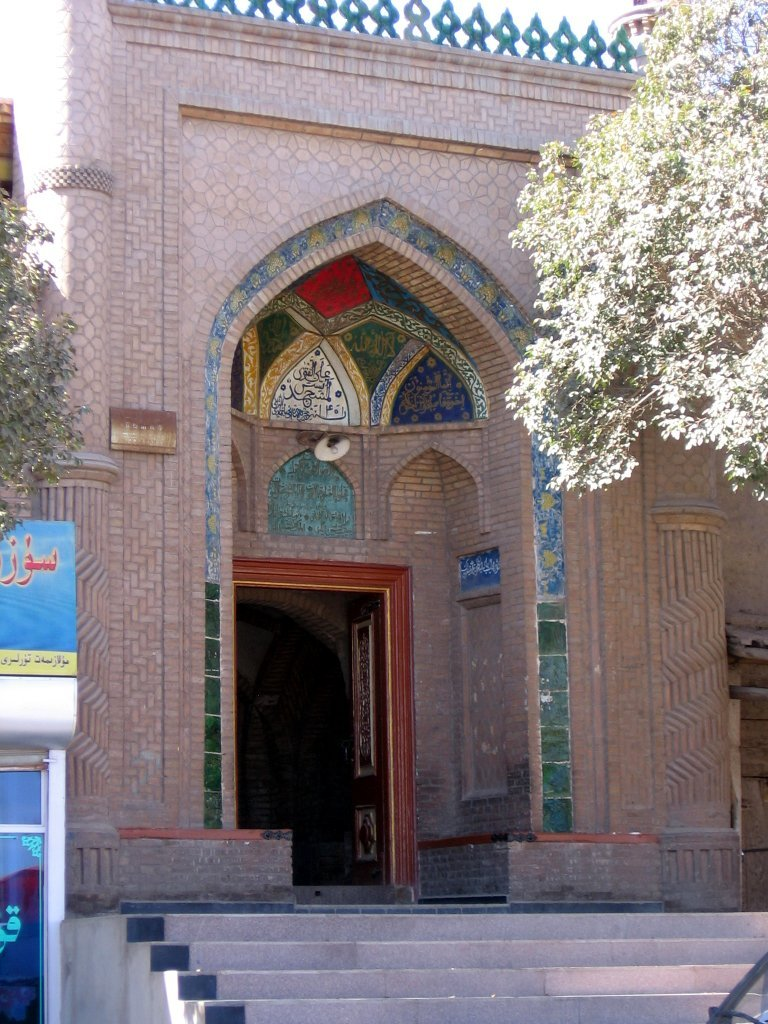
Mosque entrance in old Kashgar

In 751 the Chinese were defeated by an Arab army in the Battle of Talas. The An Lushan rebellion led to the decline of Tang influence in Central Asia due to the fact that the Tang dynasty was forced to withdraw its troops from the region to fight An Lushan. The Tibetans cut all communication between China and the West in 766.

Soon after the Chinese pilgrim monk Wukong passed through Kashgar in 753. He again reached Kashgar on his return trip from India in 786 and mentions a Chinese deputy governor as well as the local king.

== Battles with Arab Caliphate ==
In 711, the Arabs invaded Kashgar. It is alleged that Qutayba ibn Muslim in 712-715 had conquered Xinjiang. Although the Muslim religion from the very commencement sustained checks, it nevertheless made its weight felt upon the independent states of Turkestan to the north and east, and thus acquired a steadily growing influence. It was not, however, till the 10th century that Islam was established at Kashgar, under the Kara-Khanid Khanate.

The fall of Kashgar to Qutayba ibn Muslim is claimed as the start of Islam in the region by Al-Qaeda ideologue Mustafa Setmariam Nasar and by an article from Al-Qaeda branch Al-Nusra Front's English language "Al-Risalah magazine". (Note: (مجلة الرسالة), second issue (العدد الثاني), translated from English into Turkish by the "Doğu Türkistan Haber Ajansı" (East Turkestan News Agency) and titled Al Risale: "Türkistan Dağları" 1. Bölüm (The Message : "Turkistan Mountains" Part 2.))

In 717 the Arabs took Kashgar again, en route to besiege Uqturpan and Aksu, 400km deeper into Chinese territory than Kashgar. Though they and their Tibetan and Turgesh allies were defeated by the Tang at the Battle of Aksu on August 15, 717, and subsequently lost control over much of their gains in previous decades.

== Turkic rule ==
During the Samanid Empire (819-999) Kashgar was under a dehqan named Toghan Tigin, though it is not mentioned whether he had converted to Islam or not. In 922, after a failed rebellion Samanid prince, Ilyas ibn Ishaq, fled to Kashgar.

According to the 10th-century text, Hudud al-'Alam, "the chiefs of Kashghar in the days of old were from the Karluks, or from the Yagma." The Karluks, Yaghmas and other tribes such as the Chigils formed the Karakhanids. The Karakhanid Sultan Satuq Bughra Khan converted to Islam in the 10th century and captured Kashgar. Kashgar was the capital of the Karakhanid state for a time but later the capital was moved to Balasagun. During the latter part of the 10th century, the Muslim Karakhanids began a struggle against the Buddhist Kingdom of Khotan, and the Khotanese defeated the Karakhanids and captured Kashgar in 970. Chinese sources recorded the king of Khotan offering to send them a dancing elephant captured from Kashgar. Later in 1006, the Karakhanids of Kashgar under Yusuf Kadr Khan conquered Khotan.

The Karakhanid Khanate however was beset with internal strife, and the khanate split into two, the Eastern and Western Karakhanid Khanates, with Kashgar falling within the domain of the Eastern Karakhanid state. In 1089, the Western Karakhanids fell under the control of the Seljuks, but the Eastern Karakhanids was for the most part independent.

Both the Karakhanid states were defeated in the 12th century by the Kara-Khitans who captured Balasaghun, however Karakhanid rule continued in Kashgar under the suzerainty of the Kara-Khitans. The Kara-Khitan rulers followed a policy of religious tolerance, Islamic religious life continued uninterrupted and Kashgar was also a Nestorian metropolitan see. The last Karakhanid of Kashgar was killed in a revolt in 1211 by the city's notables. Kuchlug, a usurper of the throne of the Kara-Khitans, then attacked Kashgar which finally surrendered in 1214.

== The Mongols ==
The Kara-Khitai in their turn were swept away in 1219 by Genghis Khan. After his death, Kashgar came under the rule of the Chagatai khans. Marco Polo visited the city, which he calls Cascar, about 1273-4 and recorded the presence of numerous Nestorian Christians, who had their own churches. Later In the 14th century, a Chagataid khan Tughlugh Timur converted to Islam, and Islamic tradition began to reassert its ascendancy.

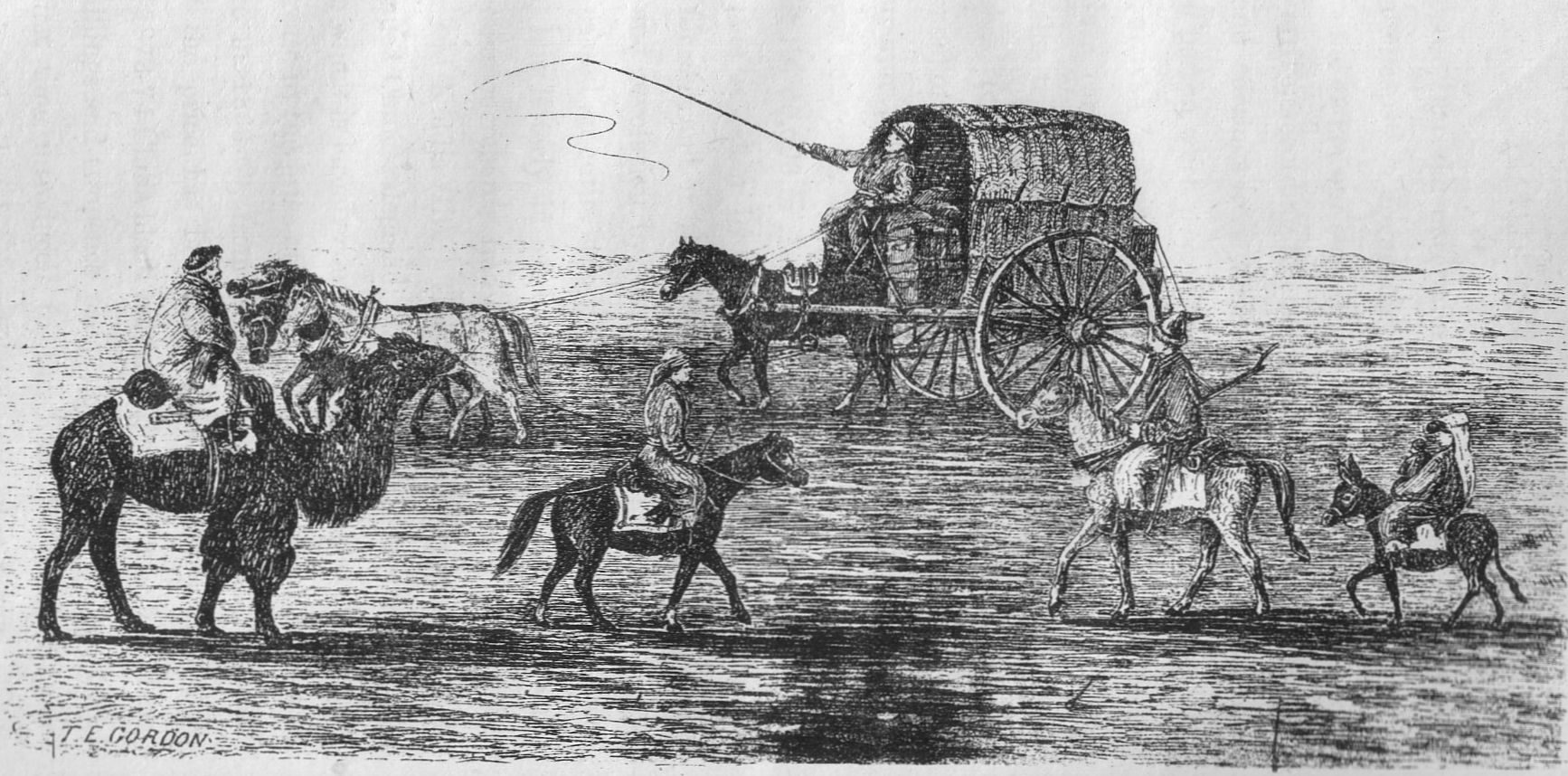
Kashgar road scene, 1870s

Kashgar endured a troubled time, and in 1514, on the invasion of the Khan Sultan Said, was destroyed by Mirza Ababakar, who with the aid of ten thousand men built a new fort with massive defences higher up on the banks of the Tuman River. The dynasty of the Chagatai Khans collapsed in 1572 with the division of the country among rival factions; soon after, two powerful Khoja factions, the White and Black Mountaineers (Ak Taghliq or Afaqi, and Kara Taghliq or Ishaqi), arose whose differences and war-making gestures, with the intermittent episode of the Oirats of Dzungaria, make up much of recorded history in Kashgar until 1759. The Dzungar Khanate conquered Kashgar and set up the Khoja as their puppet rulers.

== Qing conquest ==
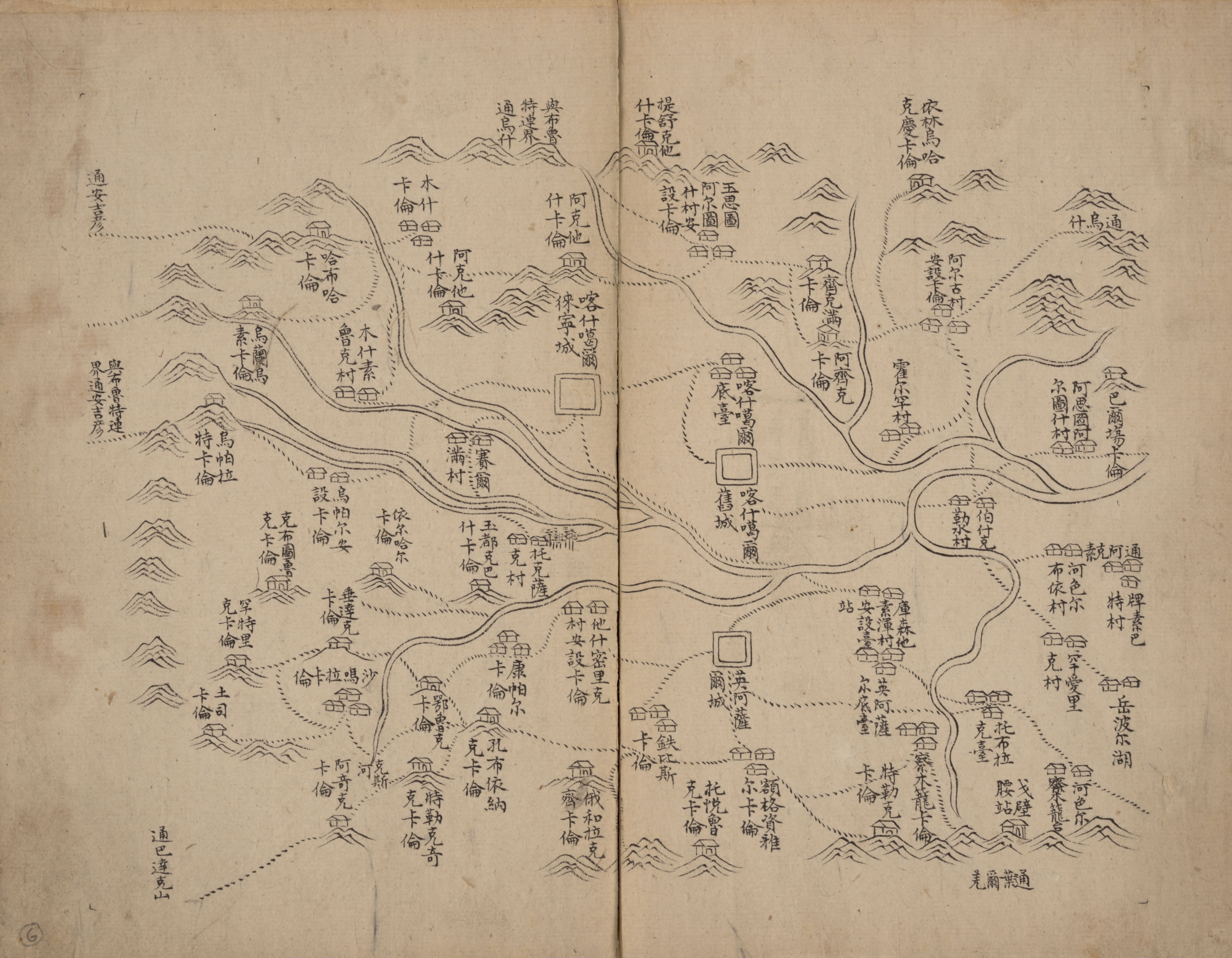
Kashgar (c. 1759)

The Qing dynasty defeated the Dzungar Khanate during the Ten Great Campaigns and took control of Kashgar in 1759. The conquerors consolidated their authority by settling other ethnics emigrants in the vicinity of a Manchu garrison.

Rumours flew around Central Asia that the Qing planned to launch expeditions towards Transoxiana and Samarkand, the chiefs of which sought assistance from the Afghan king Ahmed Shah Abdali. The alleged expedition never happened so Ahmad Shah withdrew his forces from Kokand. He also dispatched an ambassador to Beijing to discuss the situation of the Afaqi Khojas, but the representative was not well received, and Ahmed Shah was too busy fighting off the Sikhs to attempt to enforce his demands through arms.

The Qing continued to hold Kashgar with occasional interruptions during the Afaqi Khoja revolts. One of the most serious of these occurred in 1827, when the city was taken by Jahangir Khoja; Chang-lung, however, the Qing general of Ili, regained possession of Kashgar and the other rebellious cities in 1828.

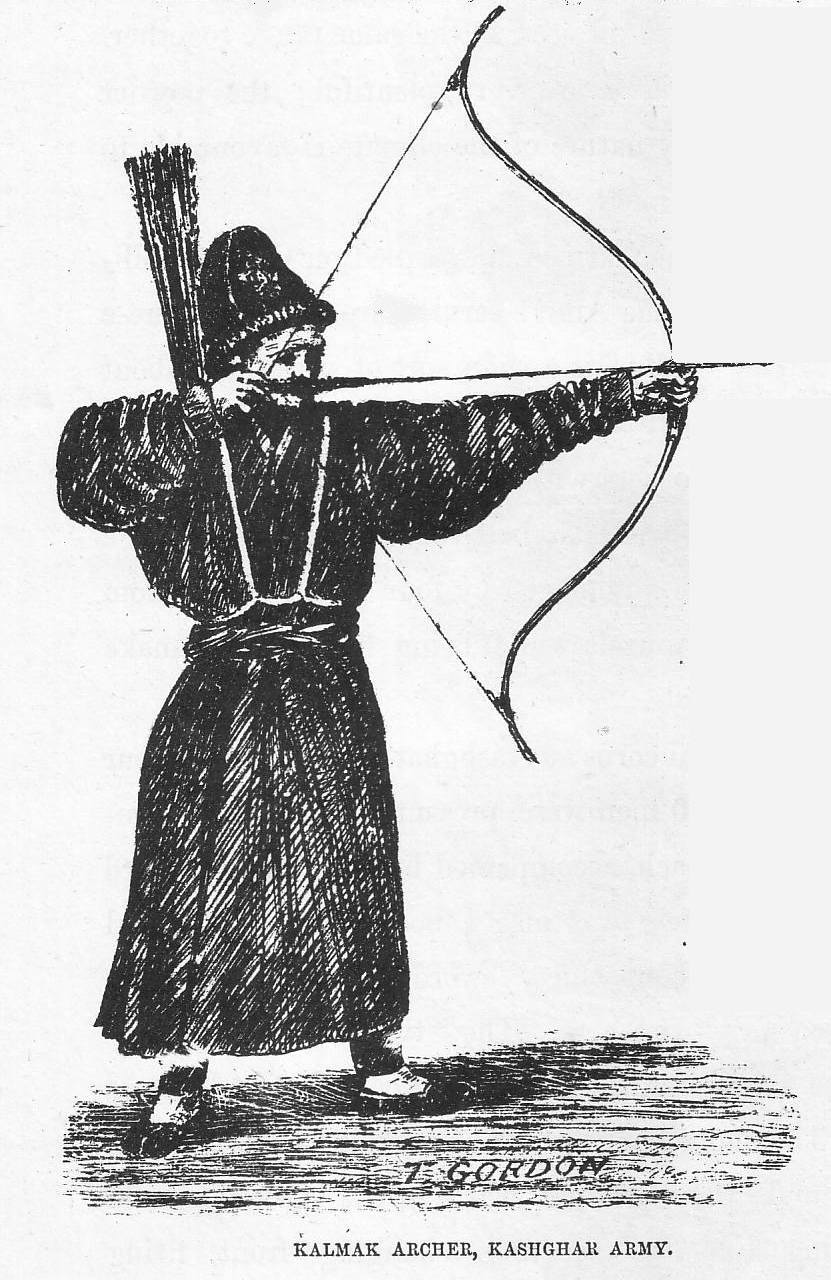
Kalmyk Archer, Kashgar Army in the 1870s

The Kokand Khanate raided Kashgar several times. A revolt in 1829 under Mahommed Ali Khan and Yusuf, brother of Jahanghir resulted in the concession of several important trade privileges to the Muslims of the district of Altishahr (the "six cities"), as it was then called.

The area enjoyed relative calm until 1846 under the rule of Zahir-ud-din, the local Uyghur governor, but in that year a new Khoja revolt under Kath Tora led to his accession as the authoritarian ruler of the city. However, his reign was brief—at the end of seventy-five days, on the approach of the Chinese, he fled back to Khokand amid the jeers of the inhabitants. The last of the Khoja revolts (1857) was of about equal duration, and took place under Wali-Khan, who murdered the well-known traveler Adolf Schlagintweit.

== 1862 Chinese Hui revolt ==
The great Dungan Revolt (1862–1877) involved insurrection among various Muslim ethnic groups. It broke out in 1862 in Gansu then spread rapidly to Dzungaria and through the line of towns in the Tarim Basin.

Dungan troops based in Yarkand rose and in August 1864 massacred some seven thousand Chinese and their Manchu commander. The inhabitants of Kashgar, rising in their turn against their masters, invoked the aid of Sadik Beg, a Kyrgyz chief, who was reinforced by Buzurg Khan, the heir of Jahangir Khoja, and his general Yakub Beg. The latter men were dispatched at Sadik's request by the ruler of Khokand to raise what troops they could to aid his Muslim friends in Kashgar.

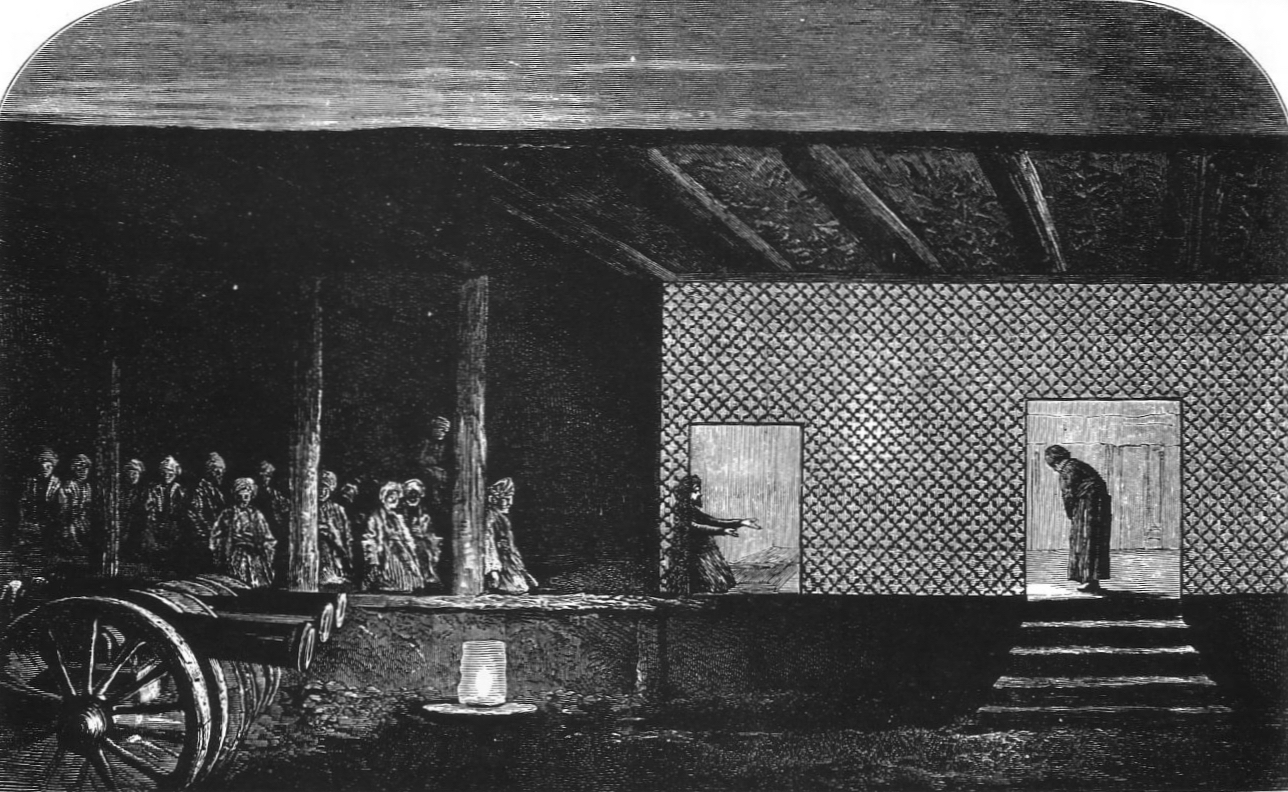
Night interview with Yakub Beg, King of Kashgaria, 1868

Sadik Beg soon repented of having asked for a Khoja, and eventually marched against Kashgar, which by this time had succumbed to Buzurg Khan and Yakub Beg, but was defeated and driven back to Khokand. Buzurg Khan delivered himself up to indolence and debauchery, but Yakub Beg, with singular energy and perseverance, made himself master of Yangi Shahr, Yangi-Hissar, Yarkand and other towns, and eventually became sole master of the country, Buzurg Khan proving himself totally unfit for the post of ruler.

With the overthrow of Chinese rule in 1865 by Yakub Beg (1820–1877), the manufacturing industries of Kashgar are supposed to have declined.

Yaqub Beg entered into relations and signed treaties with the Russian Empire and the British Empire, but when he tried to get their support against China, he failed.

Kashgar and the other cities of the Tarim Basin remained under Yakub Beg's rule until May 1877, when he died at Korla. Thereafter Kashgaria was reconquered by the forces of the Qing general Zuo Zongtang during the Qing reconquest of Xinjiang.

== Qing rule ==
There were eras in Xinjiang's history where intermarriage was common, and "laxity" set upon Uyghur women led them to marry Chinese men in the period after Yakub Beg's rule ended. It is also believed by Uyghurs that some Uyghurs have Han Chinese ancestry from historical intermarriage, such as those living in Turpan.

Even though Muslim women are forbidden to marry non-Muslims in Islamic law, from 1880 to 1949 it was frequently violated in Xinjiang when Chinese men married Uyghur women. Because they were viewed as "outcast", Islamic cemeteries banned the Uyghur wives of Chinese men from being buried within them. Uyghur women got around this problem by giving shrines donations and buying a grave in other towns. Besides Chinese men, other men such as Hindus, Armenians, Jews, Russians, and Badakhshanis (Pamiris) intermarried with local Uyghur women. The local society accepted the Uyghur women and Chinese men's mixed offspring as their own people despite the marriages being in violation of Islamic law.

An anti-Russian uproar broke out when Russian customs officials, 3 Cossacks and a Russian courier invited local Uyghur prostitutes to a party in January 1902 in Kashgar. There was a general anti-Russian sentiment, but the inflamed local Uyghur populace started a brawl with the Russians on the pretense of protecting their women. Even though morality was not strict in Kashgar, the local population confronted with the Russians before they were dispersed by guards, and the Chinese then sought to end tensions by preventing the Russians from building up a pretext to invade.

After the riot, the Russians sent troops to Sarikol in Tashkurghan and demanded that the Sarikol postal services be placed under Russian supervision, the locals of Sarikol believed that the Russians would seize the entire district from the Chinese and send more soldiers even after the Russians tried to negotiate with the Begs of Sarikol and sway them to their side, they failed since the Sarikoli officials and authorities demanded in a petition to the Amban of Yarkand that they be evacuated to Yarkand to avoid being harassed by the Russians and objected to the Russian presence in Sarikol, the Sarikolis did not believe the Russian claim that they would leave them alone and only involved themselves in the mail service.

== First East Turkestan Republic ==
Kashgar was the scene of continual battles from 1933 to 1934. Ma Shaowu, a Chinese Muslim, was the Tao-yin of Kashgar, and he fought against Uyghur rebels. He was joined by another Chinese Muslim general, Ma Zhancang.

=== Battle of Kashgar (1933) ===
Uyghur and Kirghiz forces, led by the Bughra brothers and Tawfiq Bay, attempted to take the New City of Kashgar from Chinese Muslim troops under General Ma Zhancang. They were defeated.

Tawfiq Bey, a Syrian Arab traveler, who held the title Sayyid (descendant of Muhammad) and arrived at Kashgar on August 26, 1933, was shot in the stomach by the Chinese Muslim troops in September. Previously Ma Zhancang arranged to have the Uyghur leader Timur Beg killed and beheaded on August 9, 1933, displaying his head outside of Id Kah Mosque.

Han Chinese troops commanded by Brigadier Yang were absorbed into Ma Zhancang's army. A number of Han Chinese officers were spotted wearing the green uniforms of Ma Zhancang's unit of the 36th division; presumably they had converted to Islam.

=== Battle of Kashgar (1934) ===
The 36th division General Ma Fuyuan led a Chinese Muslim army to storm Kashgar on February 6, 1934, attacking the Uyghur and Kyrgyz rebels of the First East Turkestan Republic. He freed another 36th division general, Ma Zhancang, who was trapped with his Chinese Muslim and Han Chinese troops in Kashgar New City by the Uyghurs and Kyrgyz since May 22, 1933. In January, 1934, Ma Zhancang's Chinese Muslim troops repulsed six Uyghur attacks, launched by Khoja Niyaz, who arrived at the city on January 13, 1934, inflicting massive casualties on the Uyghur forces. From 1,700 to 2,000 Uyghur civilians in Kashgar Old City were massacred by Tungans in February, 1934, in revenge for the Kizil massacre, after retreating of Uyghur forces from the city to Yengi Hisar. The Chinese Muslim and 36th division Chief General Ma Zhongying, who arrived at Kashgar on April 7, 1934, gave a speech at Id Kah Mosque in April, reminding the Uyghurs to be loyal to the Republic of China government at Nanjing. Several British citizens at the British consulate were killed or wounded by the 36th division on March 16, 1934.

== People's Republic of China ==
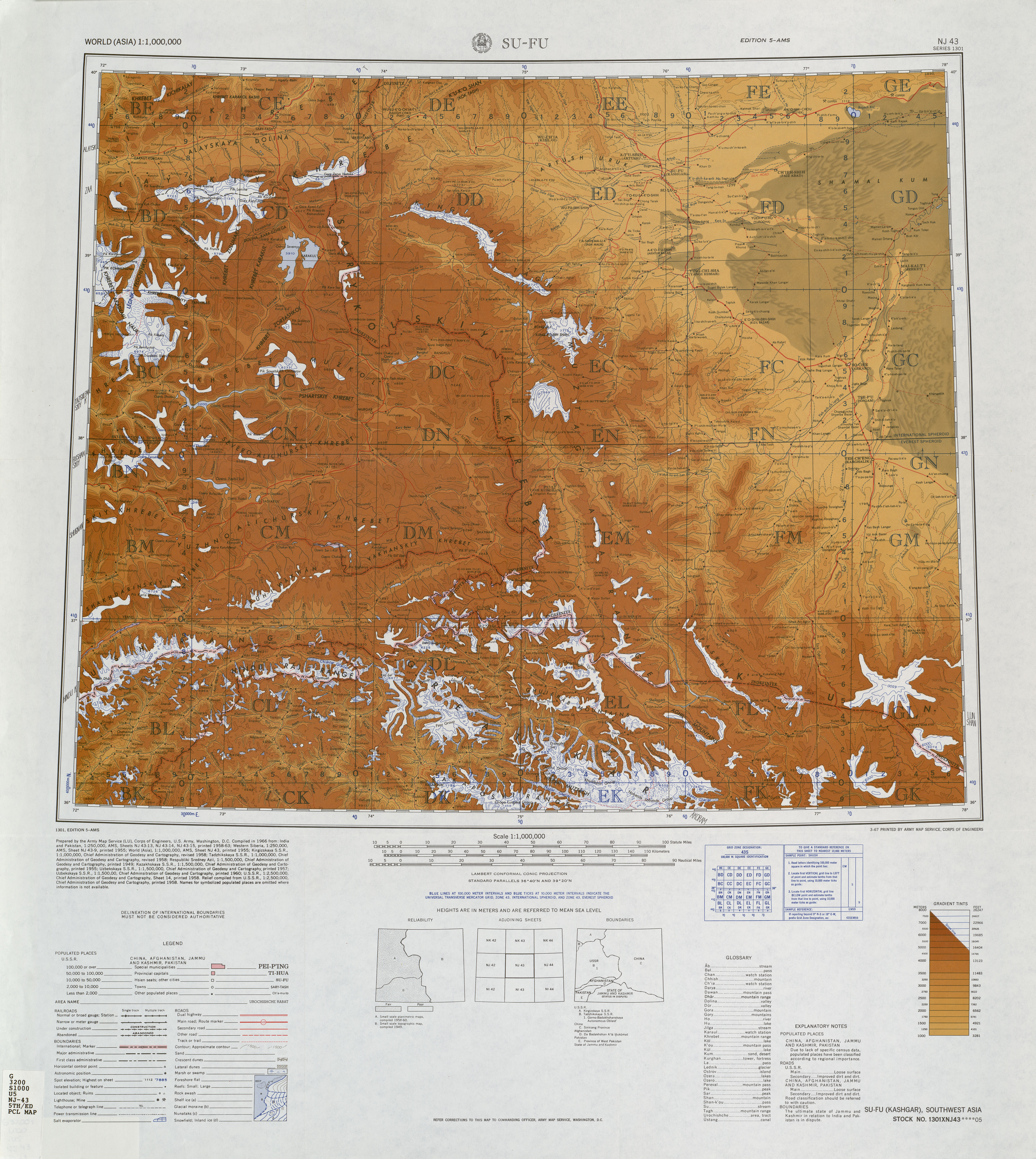
Map of Kashgar (labeled as SU-FU (KASHGAR)) and surrounding region from the International Map of the World (1966) (Note: From map: "DELINEATION OF INTERNATIONAL BOUNDARIES MUST NOT BE CONSIDERED AUTHORITATIVE")

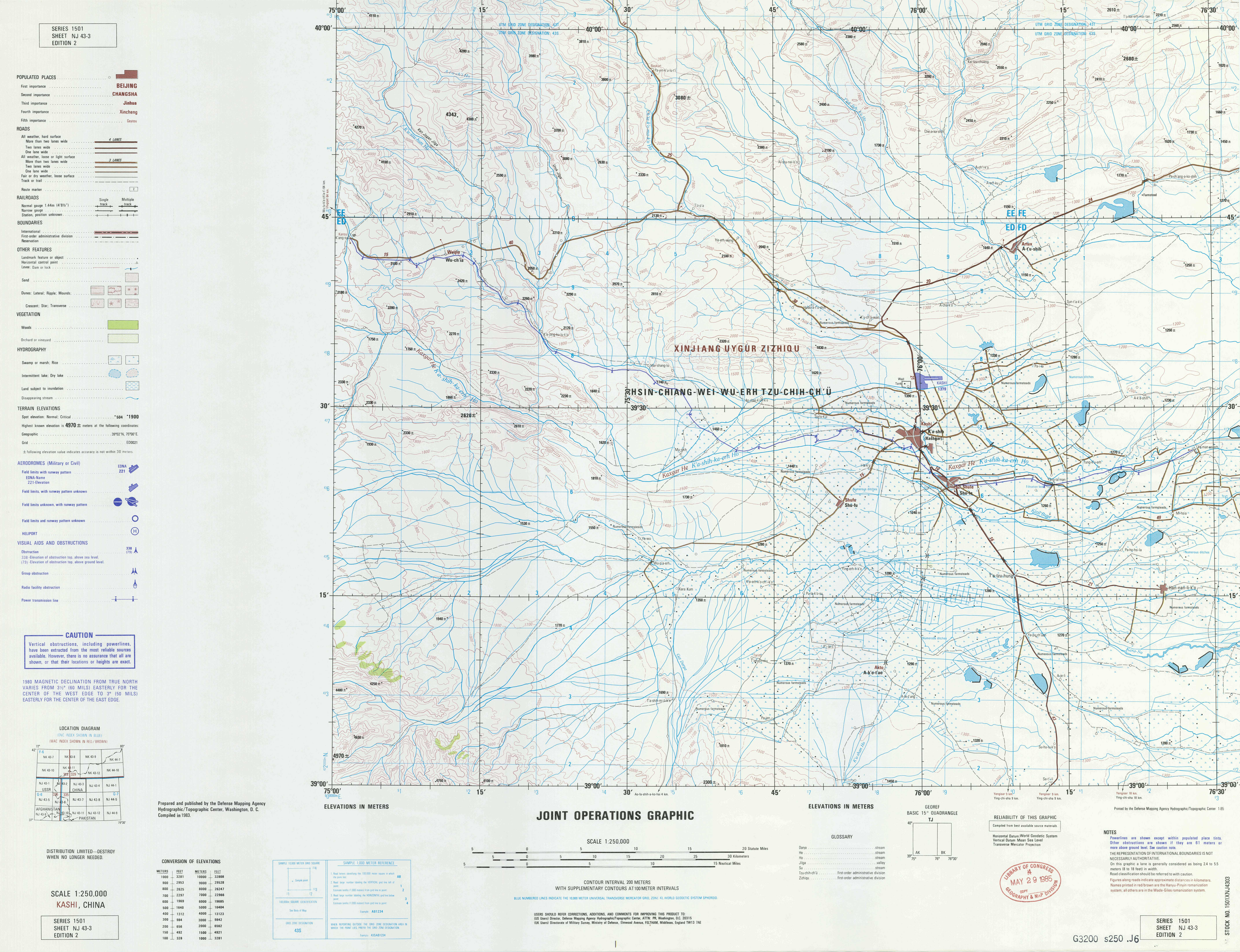
Map including Kashgar (labeled as Kashi K'a-shih (Kashgar)) (DMA, 1983)

Kashgar was incorporated into the People's Republic of China in 1949. During the Cultural Revolution, one of the largest statues of Mao in China was built in Kashgar, near People's Square.

On October 31, 1981, an incident occurred in the city due to a dispute between Uyghurs and Han Chinese in which three were killed. The incident was quelled by an army unit.

In 1986, the Chinese government designated Kashgar a "city of historical and cultural significance". Kashgar and surrounding regions have been the site of Uyghur unrest since the 1990s. In 2008, two Uyghur men carried out a vehicular, IED and knife attack against police officers. In 2009, development of Kashgar's old town accelerated after the revelations of the deadly role of faulty architecture during the 2008 Sichuan earthquake. Many of the old houses in the old town were built without regulation, and as a result, officials found them to be overcrowded and non-compliant with fire and earthquake codes. Additionally, the newer buildings may also have been built with increased ease of surveillance in mind.

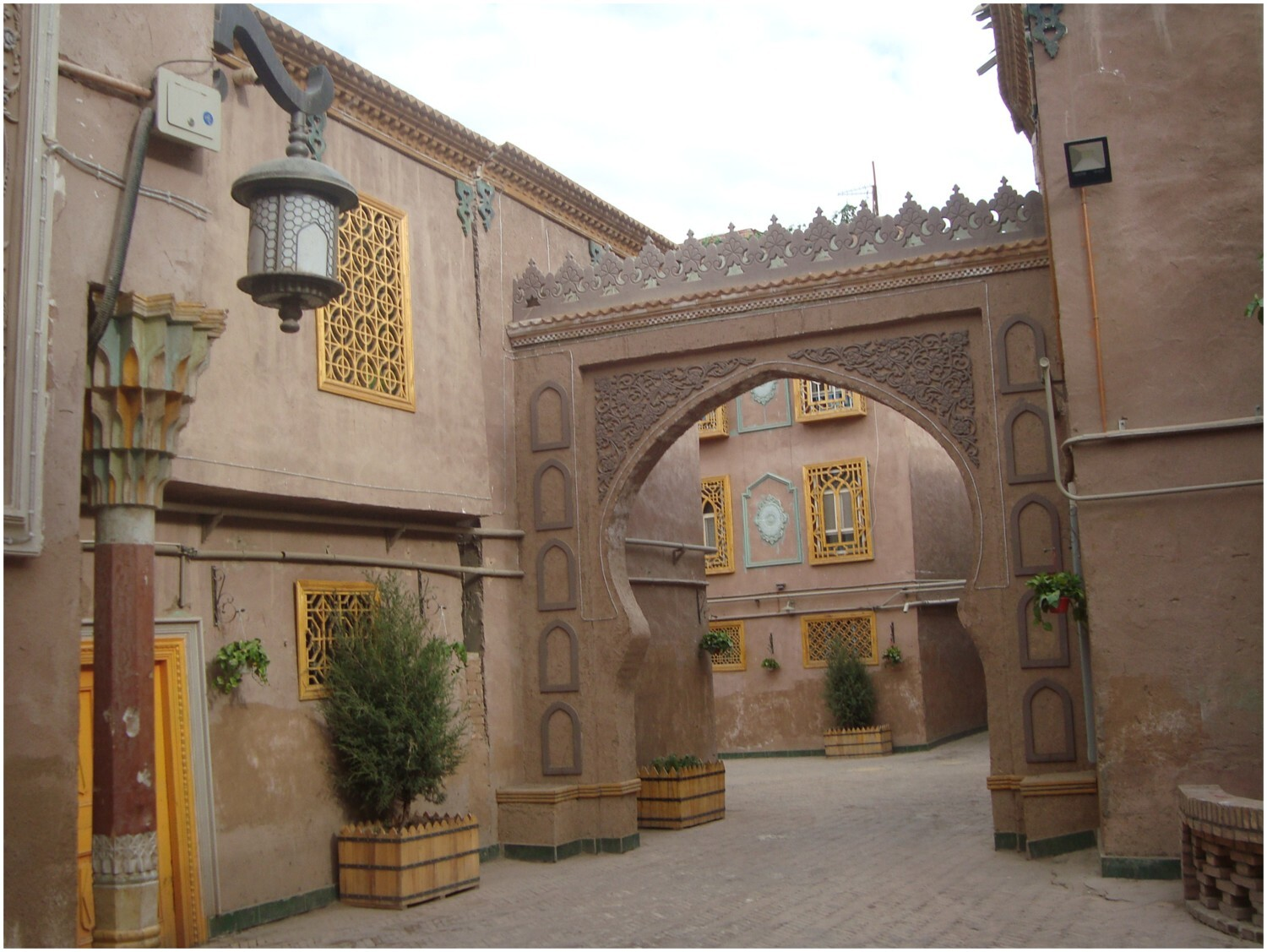
Kashgar’s Old Town

When the plan started, 42% of the city's residents lived in the old town. As the plan was undertaken, residents have been removed from their homes in order to demolish large sections of the old city and replace these areas with new developments. The European Parliament issued a resolution in 2011 calling for "culture-sensitive methods of renovation." The International Scientific Committee on Earthen Architectural Heritage (ISCEAH) has expressed concern over the demolition and reconstruction of historic buildings. ISCEAH has, additionally, urged the implementation of techniques utilized elsewhere in the world to address earthquake vulnerability.

Following the July 2009 Ürümqi riots, the government focused on local economic development in an attempt to ameliorate ethnic tensions in the greater Xinjiang region. Kashgar was made into a special economic zone in 2010, the first such zone in China's far west. In 2011, a spate of violence over two days killed dozens of people. By May 2012, two-thirds of the old city had been demolished, fulfilling "political as well as economic goals." Critics have called the destruction of the old city part of a campaign of cultural genocide. In July 2014, the Imam of the Id Kah Mosque, Juma Tayir, was assassinated in Kashgar.

On October 21, 2014, Aqqash Township (Akekashi) was transferred from Konaxahar (Shufu) County to Kashgar city.
