= Committee for National Revolution =

Uyghur nationalist party (1932–1934)

- Leader: Sabit Damulla Abdulbaki
- Founded: 1932
- Dissolved: 1934
- Headquarters: Kashgar, First East Turkestan Republic
- Ideology: Jadidism; Turkic nationalism Pan-Turkism; Anti-communism; Anti-Han sentiment Anti-Hui sentiment
- Political position: Right-wing
- Religion: Sunni Islam

The Committee for National Revolution (Chinese: 民族革命委員會) was a Turkic nationalist Uyghur-centered party which existed in 1932–1934. It helped found the First East Turkestan Republic. It was anti-Chinese, anti-Chinese Muslim, and anti-Communist. The leader of Karakash gold miners Ismail Khan Khoja, the Khotan Emir Muhammad Amin Bughra, his brothers Abdullah Bughra, Nur Ahmad Jan Bughra, and Sabit Damulla Abdulbaki joined the committee. It had originally 300 members and 50 rifles. On February 20, 1933, it set up a provisional Khotan government with Sabit as prime minister and Muhammad Amin Bughra as head of the armed forces. It favored the establishment of an Islamic theocracy.

== See also ==
- List of Islamic political parties
- First East Turkestan Republic
- Second East Turkestan Republic
- Young Kashgar Party
