= Battle of Kashgar =

There were two battles of Kashgar, The battles were fought at the old city of Kashgar (as opposed to the "new city") in Xinjiang.

- Battle of Kashgar (1933)
- Battle of Kashgar (1934)
