= Tawfiq Bay =

Syrian pan-Islamist who fought in Xinjiang, China

- Tawfiq Bay's grave in New York
- Born: 1897; Damascus, Syria
- Died: 1968 (aged 70–71); New York
- Military career
- Allegiance: First East Turkestan Republic
- Service years: 1914-1918 1933–1934
- Rank: General
- Nickname: Beyzada
- Commands: General
- Conflicts: Battle of Kashgar (1933)

Sayyid Ahmad Tawfiq Bay Sharif Efendi (Arabic: سيد احمد توفيق باي شريف أفندي), also Tevfik Pasha (Chinese: 陶菲格·貝伊), was a Syrian born European Turk who fought for the Ottoman Empire during World war 1. He had been in the service of King Ibn Saud of Saudi Arabia, eventually traveling to Xinjiang, Republic of China, in 1932. He was deported by the Chinese Muslim Daotai Ma Shaowu. On August 26 he arrived at Kashgar oases. He joined the Uighur and Kirghiz Turkic Muslim fighters of the First East Turkestan Republic, who were fighting against the Chinese Muslim forces of the 36th Division (National Revolutionary Army), who were loyal to the Republic of China government. Tawfiq was a follower of Enver Pasha and a devoted believer in Pan Turkism.

The Turkic armies were led by Kirghiz Osman Ali, Abdullah Bughra, Nur Ahmad Jan Bughra, and Muhammad Amin Bughra. Tawfiq Bay was given command of an army of Turkic fighters.

The Chinese Muslim General Ma Zhancang beat off the Turkic Muslims led by Tawfiq and Osman with ease at Kashgar New City, and inflicted severe casualties on the Turkic troops. On September 26, 1933, Tawfiq Bay led an assault against the Chinese Muslims in Kashgar New City. Ma Zhancang's troops repulsed the attack, inflicting heavy casualties, and Tawfiq Bay was severely wounded in the stomach, and retired from fighting.

After Ma Zhancang's troops completely defeated and exterminated the First East Turkestan Republic in 1934, Tawfiq fled to Afghanistan. There, he made contact with the Japanese Ambassador Kitada Masamoto. He moved to Japan and married an 18 year old Volga Tatar woman with whom he had 4 children.
