= Amina Bughra =

Uyghur politician in China

- أمينه بوغرا
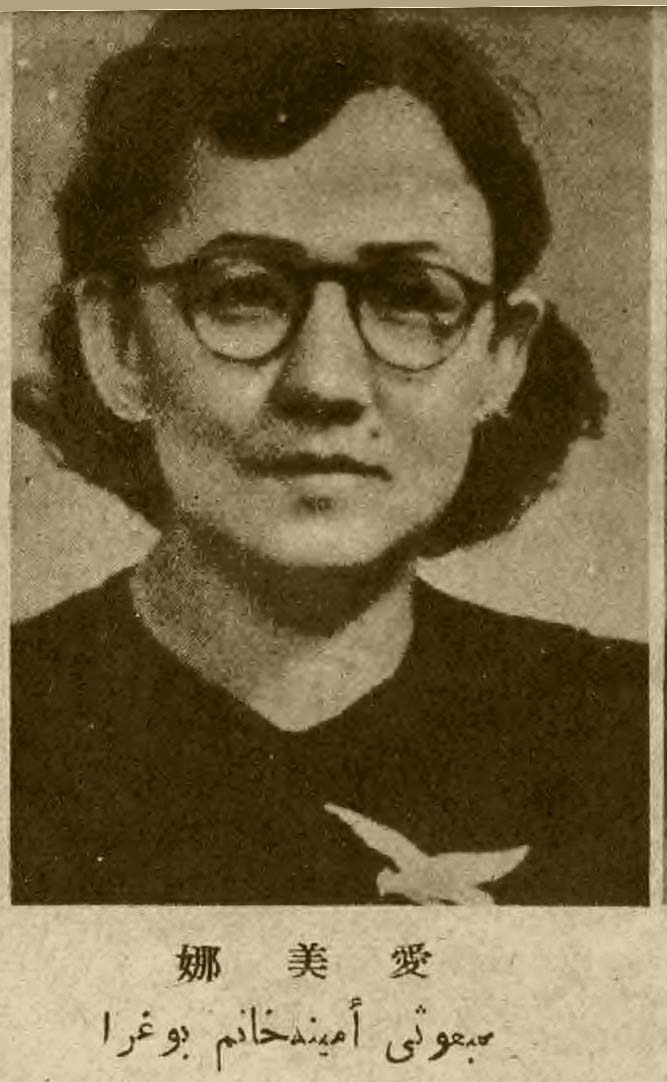

Member of the Legislative Yuan
- In office 1948–1955
- Constituency: Xinjiang

Personal details
- Political party: Kuomintang
- Spouse: Muhammad Amin Bughra

Amina Bughra (Uyghur: أمينه بوغرا; Chinese: 愛美娜) was a Uyghur politician in China. She was one of the first group of women elected to the Legislative Yuan in 1948.

== Biography ==
Bughra married Uyghur leader Muhammad Amin Bughra. She became deputy chair of the Xinjian Women's Association, and was a member of the National Constituent Assembly that drew up the Constitution of the Republic of China. She was subsequently elected to the Legislative Yuan in the 1948 elections. After being elected, she sat on the Political and Local Self-Government Committee, the Foreign Affairs Committee and the Border Committee. She resigned from the Legislative Yuan in 1955.
