= Muhammad Amin Bughra =

Uyghur emir (1901–1965)

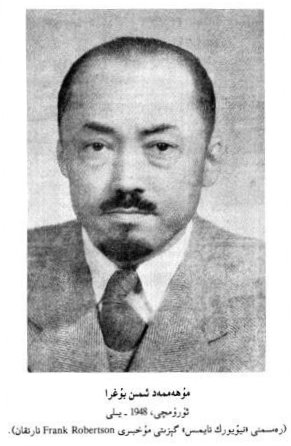
- Muhammad Amin Bughra in 1948

Emir of the Khotan
- In office 1932 – April 1934

Member of the National Assembly of the Republic of China from Xinjiang province
- In office 1943 – –

Personal details
- Born: April 22, 1901 Hotan, Xinjiang, Qing China
- Died: April 29, 1965 (age 64) Turkey
- Party: Young Kashgar Party and Committee for National Revolution
- Relations: Abdullah Bughra, Nur Ahmad Jan Bughra

Muhammad Amin Bughra (Uyghur: مۇھەممەد ئىمىن بۇغرا, محمد أمين بغرا, Мухаммад Эмин Бугро; Chinese: 穆罕默德·伊敏; pinyin: Mùhǎnmòdé·Yīmǐn), sometimes known by his Chinese name Mao Deming (Chinese: 毛德明) or his Turkish name Mehmet Emin Buğra (1901–1965), was a Uyghur emir who attempted to establish a sovereign state, the First East Turkestan Republic. He was a Jadidist.

== Life ==
In the spring of 1937, rebellion again broke out in Southern Xinjiang. A number of factors contributed to the outbreak. In an effort to appease the Turkic Muslims, Sheng Shicai had appointed a number of their non-secessionist leaders, including Khoja Niyaz Hajji and Yulbars Khan, another leader of the Kumul uprising (February 20, 1931– November 30, 1931), to positions of influence in the provincial government, both in Di Hua (modern Ürümqi) and Kashgar.

At the same time, educational reforms, which attacked basic Islamic principles and the atheistic propaganda program, which was being extended into the south, were further alienating the local population from Sheng's administration. In Kashgar Mahmud Sijang, a wealthy Muslim, former leader of the Turpan uprising (1932) and one of Sheng's appointees, became the focal point for opposition to the government.

Meanwhile, in Afghanistan under Sardar Mohammad Hashim Khan, Muhammad Amin, the exiled leader of the Turkish Islamic Republic of East Turkestan (TIRET, known as the first East Turkestan Republic), had approached the Japanese ambassador in 1935 with "a detailed plan proposing the establishment of an 'Eastern Turkestan Republic' under Japanese sponsorship, with munitions and finance to be supplied by Tokyo... he suggested as the future leader of this proposed Central Asian 'Manchukuo' none other than Mahmud Sijang (Mahmut Muhiti – commander of the 6th Uyghur Division, stationed in Kashgar as part of the Sinkiang provincial armed forces, since July 20, 1934), amongst the invitation at such political entity as Greater East Asian Co-Prosperity Sphere how active member." However, this plan was aborted when Mahmud, fearful for his life, fled from Kashgar to India on April 2, 1937, after failed attempt of Sheng Shicai to disarm his troops by offering to "modernize" weapons of 6th Uyghur Division, prior which all old weapons of Division was to be given over to Urumchi representatives.

Mahmud's flight sparked an uprising amongst his troops against provincial authorities. Those who were pro-Soviet in any way were executed and yet another independent Muslim administration was set up under leadership of the close associate of Mahmut Muhiti General Abduniyaz (killed in action in Yarkand on August 15, 1937), who adopted a command of troops, which enlisted about 4,000 soldiers and officers, consisted of 4 regiments, two of them being stationed in Kashgar, one in Yangihissar, one in Yarkand, also one brigade was stationed in Ustin Atush and one cavalry guard escadron in Kashgar. Sheng Shicai's provincial troops were defeated and routed by rebels in the fierce battle near city of Karashahr in July 1937, but eventually the uprising was quelled by Soviet troops (by the so-called Kyrgyz Brigade, about 5,000 troops, consisted of two tactical groups- Oshskaya and Narinskaya, each included 2 mountain regiments, one of Red Army and one of NKVD, reinforced by armoured vehicles, tank battalion (21 BT-7) and aviation; there were unconfirmed reports of the use of chemical weapons by these intervention forces against rebels), invited by Sheng Shicai to intervene in August 1937.

In 1940, Muhammad Amin published the book Sharkiy Turkestan Tarihi (East Turkestan History) while in exile in Kashmir, which described the history of the region from ancient times to the present day and contained an analysis of the reasons for the loss of its independence in the middle of the eighteenth century.

In 1940 Isa Yusuf Alptekin and Ma Fuliang who were sent by Chiang Kai-shek, visited Afghanistan and contacted Bughra, they asked him to come to Chongqing, the capital of the Kuomintang regime. Bughra was arrested by the British in 1942 for spying for Japan and the Kuomintang arranged for Bughra's release. He and Isa Yusuf worked as editors of Kuomintang Muslim publications. Under the Zhang Zhizhong regime in Xinjiang, he was provincial commissioner.

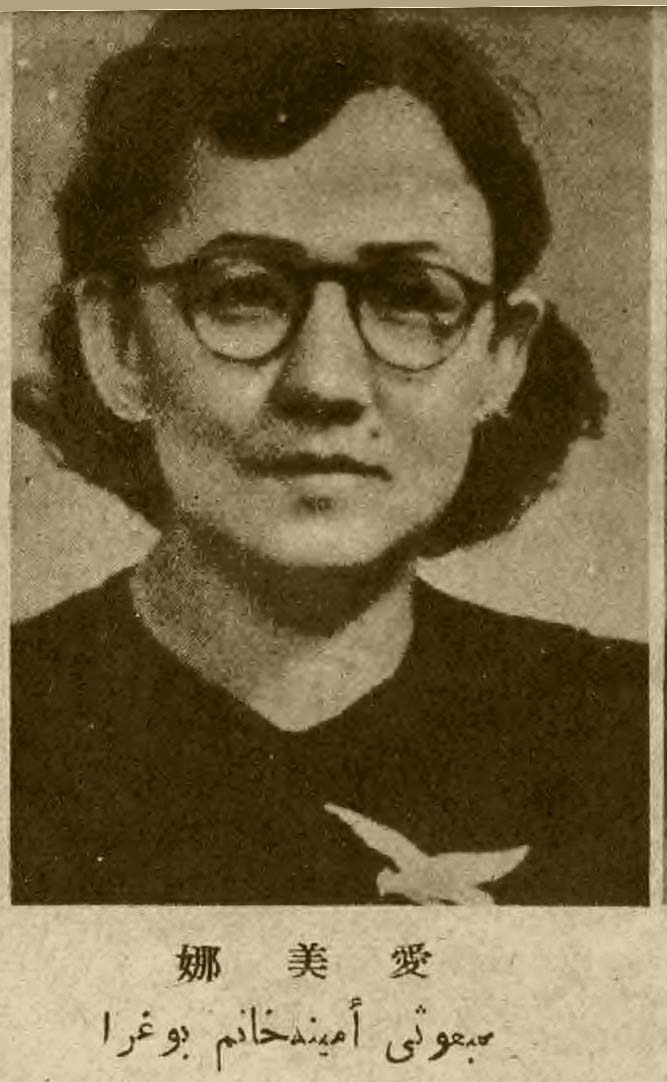
Muhammad Amin's wife, Amina.

Muhammad Amin and fellow Pan-Turkic Jadidist Masud Sabri rejected the Soviet imposition of the name "Uyghur people" upon the Turkic people of Xinjiang. They wanted instead the name "Turkic ethnicity" (Tujue zu in Chinese) to be applied to their people. Masud Sabri also viewed the Hui people as Muslim Han Chinese and separate from his own people. The names "Türk" or "Türki" in particular were demanded by Bughra as the real name for his people. He slammed Sheng Shicai for his designation of Turkic Muslims into different ethnicities which could sow disunion among Turkic Muslims.

In 1948, Bughra's wife Amina was elected to the Legislative Yuan. In December the same year he was appointed by Chiang Kai-shek as vice-chairman of the Sinkiang Government, led by Burhan Shahidi. He declared an alliance with the Chinese nationalists (Kuomintang) in order to gain autonomy for the Turkic people, under formal protection of the Republic of China and necessity of quelling all communist forces in Sinkiang, including the Soviet backed Second East Turkestan Republic.

There were 3 Effendis (Üch Äpändi; ئۈچ ئەپەندى): Aisa Alptekin, Muhammad Amin and Masud Sabri. The Second East Turkestan Republic attacked them as Kuomintang "puppets".

== Exile ==
Upon the approach of the Chinese People's Liberation Army to Sinkiang in September 1949, Muhammad Amin fled to India, then to Turkey, where he joined another exiled Uyghur leader, Isa Yusuf Alptekin.

In 1954, Muhammad Amin and Isa Yusuf Alptekin went to Taiwan to try to persuade the Kuomintang government of the Republic of China of dropping its claims to Xinjiang. Their demand was rejected and Taiwan affirmed that it claimed Xinjiang as "an integral part of China".

Muhammad Amin died in exile in Turkey in 1965.

== Sources ==
- Mark Dickens. The Soviets in Xinjiang (1911–1949). 1990.
- Allen S. Whiting (1958) and General Sheng Shicai. Sinkiang: Pawn or Pivot ?. Michigan State University Press, USA, 1958.
- Millward, James A. (2007). Eurasian Crossroads: A History of Xinjiang (illustrated ed.). Columbia University Press. ISBN 978-0231139243.
- C. X. George Wei; Xiaoyuan Liu, eds. (2002). Exploring Nationalisms of China: Themes and Conflicts. Vol. 102 of Contributions to the Study of World History Series. Greenwood Publishing Group. ISBN 0313315124.
