= Battle of Kashgar (1933) =

1933 battle of the Kumul Rebellion

- Part of the Kumul Rebellion
Date	? 1933 – September 1933
Location	Kashgar, Xinjiang
Result	Republic of China victory

Belligerents
(Republic of China (1912–1949)) Republic of China: (Republic of China (1912–1949)) New 36th Division	First East Turkestan Republic

Commanders and leaders
(Republic of China (1912–1949)) Ma Zhancang (Republic of China (1912–1949)) Ma Shaowu	(First East Turkestan Republic) Nur Ahmad Jan Bughra (First East Turkestan Republic) Abdullah Bughra (First East Turkestan Republic) Osman Ali (Kirghiz) (First East Turkestan Republic) Timur Beg † (First East Turkestan Republic) Tawfiq Bay (WIA)

Strength
500 Hui Chinese and Han Chinese troops	Thousands of Turkic Muslim Uighur and Kirghiz fighters

Casualties and losses
	150+ Kirghiz Killed

In 1933 Battle of Kashgar (Chinese: 喀什戰役), Gen. Ma Zhancang signed a secret agreement with the daotai of Kashgar, Ma Shaowu, and his Chinese Muslim troops joined the Han Chinese garrison inside the yamen in Kashgar and helped them repulse Uighur and Kirghiz attacks led by Abdullah Bughra. Turkic Uighur and Kirghiz forces led by the Uighur Timur Beg had been attacking Chinese Muslim villages and pillaging them. During the fighting Timur Beg was shot and then beheaded by Ma Zhancang's forces, his head being put on display at the Idgah mosque. When more Chinese Muslim troops arrived, they reinforced the Chinese garrison inside Kashgar. Osman Ali, the Kirghiz rebel, attempted to attack the yamen, but was driven back with heavy losses. He then proceeded to loot the city.

On September 26, 1933, the Syrian Arab Tawfiq Bay led a Turkic force against the Chinese Muslims in Kashgar new city. Ma Zhancang repulsed the attack after very heavy fighting, and wounded Tawfiq Bay.
