= Wali Khan (khoja) =

Kokandi khoja who invaded Kashgaria

Wali Khan (sometimes spelled Vālī-khan) was a member of the Ak Taghliq clan of East Turkestan Khojas, who invaded Kashgaria from the Kokand during the Afaqi Khoja revolts on several occasions in the 1850s, and succeeded in ruling Kashgar for a short while.

Although Ak Taghliks had been expelled from Kashgaria by the Qing in the 1760s, they had not abandoned their hopes of reconquering the region, and regularly invaded it from their base in Khanate of Kokand. Wali Khan followed in the footsteps of his father, Jahangir Khoja, his uncle Yusuf, and cousin Katti Torah, who had all invaded Kashgaria with various success through the first half of the 19th century.

He invaded Kashgaria in 1852 (with Divan Quli), 1855 (with Husayn Ishan Khoja), and most famously in 1857. Wali Khan, who was reputed for his brutality and tyranny, let a rebellion in 1855 and began by attacking Kashgar.

Chinese were massacred and the daughters and wives of the subordinates of the loyalist Turki governor were seized. Adolphe Schlagintweit, a German, was executed by beheading by Wali Khan and his head put on display. Wali Khan was infamous for his cruelty and if courtiers "raised their eyes" to him he would murder them, when the call to prayer was made by a muezzin and his voice was too loud the muezzin was murdered by Wali Khan. A 12,000 strong Chinese army crushed and defeated the 20,000 strong army of Wali Khan in 77 days of combat. Wali Khan was abandoned by his "allies" due to his cruelty. The Chinese inflicted harsh reprisals upon Wali Khan's forces and had his son and father in law executed in harsh manners.

In the West Wali Khan is mostly known for his execution of the German explorer Adolf Schlagintweit in 1857, but his cruelty found many other reflections in the local legends. It is said that he killed so many innocent Muslims that four or six minarets were built from the skulls of the victims ( kala minara ); or that once, when an artisan made a sabre for him, he instantly tested the weapon with the words, "Well, I'll try it now," by cutting off the artisan's son head, who had come with his father and was standing nearby. Then, with the words, "Yes, it's a really good sabre," he presented artisan with a gift. This treatment did not make Kashgarians miss the khoja too much when he was defeated by the Chinese troops after ruling the city for four months.

The local Uyghurs of Altishahr grew to hate and despite Wali Khan for his forcible introduction of Kokandi culture and suppression of Kashgari culture and for his brutality.

In 1865, after Kokand Khanate had been successfully invaded by the Russian and its ruler Alimqul killed, Wali Khan joined a large group of Kokandian officials who decided to try their luck in Kashgaria. They appeared in Kashgar in September 1865, but had to submit to the fellow Kokandian Yaqub Beg, who had already firmly established himself as the ruler of the city. Wali Khan's followers attempts to bring him to power again very easily foiled by Yaqub Beg, who had Wali Khan arrested and sent to Yangihissar under armed guard, where he was later poisoned.
