= Timur Beg =

Uyghur military leader (1886–1933)

- تیمور بیگ
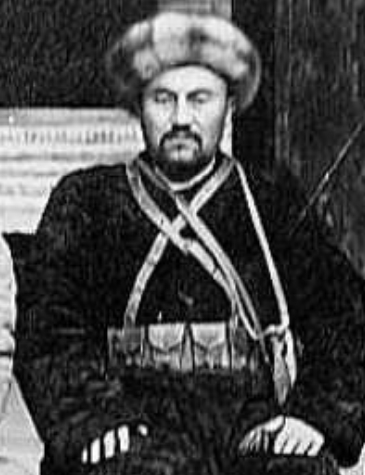

Shah
- In office 1933–1933

Personal details
- Born: 1886 Kucha, Qing Dynasty
- Died: 9 August 1933 (aged 46–47) Kashgar, Republic of China
- Party: Young Kashgar Party

Timur Beg (Uyghur: تیمور بیگ), also known as Timur Sijan (division general), was a Uyghur rebel military leader in Xinjiang in 1933. He was involved in the 1933 Battle of Kashgar and participated before in Turpan Rebellion (1932). He associated with the Turkic nationalist Young Kashgar Party and appointed himself as "Timur Shah". He and other Uyghurs like the Bughra brothers wanted to secede from China. In August 1933 his troops were attacked by the Chinese Muslim 36th Division of the National Revolutionary Army under General Ma Zhancang. Timur was shot and killed in Kashgar.
