= Young Kashgar Party =

- Leader: Abd al Rahim Bay Bachcha
- Founded: 1933
- Dissolved: 1934
- Headquarters: Kashgar
- Ideology: Uyghur nationalism Jadidism; Pan-Turkism; Anti-Han sentiment Anti-Hui sentiment
- Political position: Right-wing
- Religion: Sunni Islam

The Young Kashgar Party (Chinese: 青年喀什噶爾黨) was a Turkic nationalist Uighur political party which existed from 1933 to 1934. It helped found the First East Turkestan Republic, a separatist entity of the Republic of China. It was anti-Han and anti-Hui. The Uighur military leader Timur Beg and the Khotan Emirs Muhammad Amin Bughra, Abdullah Bughra and Nur Ahmad Jan Bughra formed an alliance with the Young Kashgar Party. It convened a parliament of 40 members and sent two delegates to Khoja Niyaz.

== See also ==
- First East Turkestan Republic
- Second East Turkestan Republic
- Timur Beg
- Young Bukharians
- Young Khivans
- Young Turks
