= Khoja (Turkestan) =

Persian title

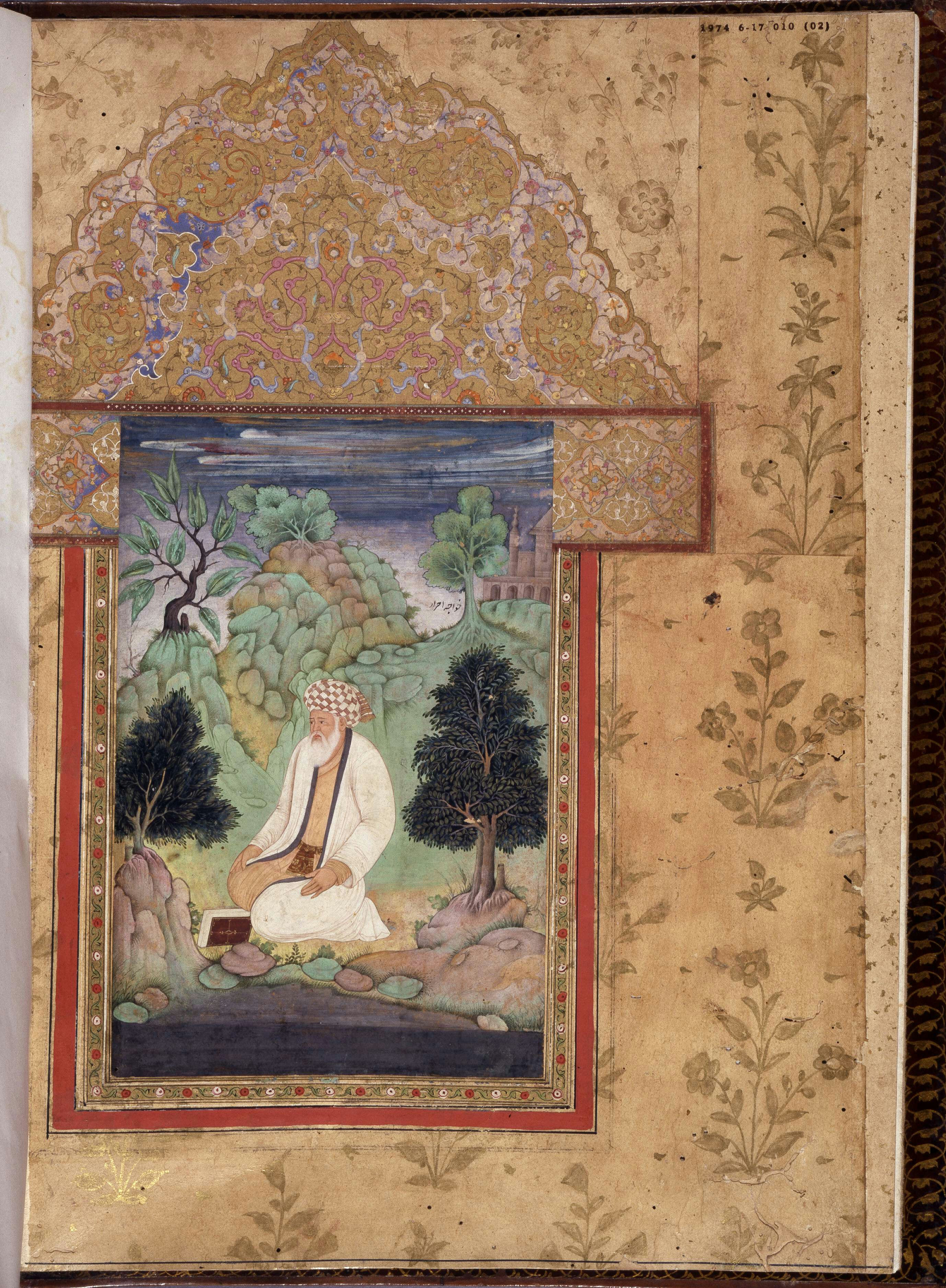
Shaykh Khwaja Ahrar (Master of the free)

Khoja or Khwaja (Kazakh: қожа; Kyrgyz: кожо; Uyghur: خوجا; Persian: خواجه; Tajik: хӯҷа; Uzbek: xo'ja; Chinese: 和卓; pinyin: hézhuó), a Persian word literally meaning 'master' or ‘lord’, was used in Central Asia as a title for the descendants of the noted Central Asian Naqshbandi Sufi teacher, Ahmad Kasani (1461–1542) or others in the Naqshbandi intellectual lineage prior to Baha al-Din Naqshband. The most powerful religious figure in the late Timurid era was the Naqshbandi Shaykh Khwaja Ahrar. The Khojas often were appointed as administrators by Mongol rulers in the Altishahr or present-day region of Tarim Basin in Xinjiang, China.

The Khojas of Altishahr claimed to be Sayyids (descendants of Muhammad) and they are still regarded as such by the fraternity people of Altishahr. Although Ahmad Kasani himself, known as Makhdūm-i-Azam or "Great Master" to his followers, never visited Altishahr (today's Tarim Basin), many of his descendants, known as Makhdūmzādas and bearing the title Khoja (properly written and pronounced Khwaja) played important parts in the region's politics from the 17th to 19th centuries.

On the death of Aḥmad Kāsānī, a division took place among the Khojas which resulted in one party becoming followers of the Makhdum's elder son Khoja Muhammad Amin better known as Ishan-i-Kalan and another attaching themselves to his younger son Khoja Muhammad Ishaq Wali. The followers of Ishan-i-Kalan seem to have acquired the name of Aq Taghliqs or White mountaineers and that of Ishaq Qara Taghliqs or Black mountaineers but these names had no reference to the localities where their adherents lived. All were inhabitants of the lowlands and cities of Eastern Turkistan but each section made allies among the Kyrgyz of the neighboring mountains and apparently subsidized them in their internecine battles. The Kyrgyz tribes of the Western Tian Shan ranges lying to the north of Kashghar were known as the White mountaineers and the Kyrgyz tribes of the Pamir, Karakoram and Kunlun as the Black mountaineers with Yarkand as their main city of influence, such that the Khojas came to assume the designations of their Kyrgyz allies.

The Chagatai language Tadhkirah i Khwajagan (a Tadhkirah) was written by M. Sadiq Kashghari.

== List of Khojas ==
Note: The following list is incomplete and, at times, possibly slightly inaccurate. It also excludes several collateral lines that ruled over minor territories and were relatively unimportant.

Aq Taghliq (The White Mountaineers)	Qara Taghliq (The Black Mountaineers)
Khoja خواجہ; Makhdum-i-Azam (The Great Master) مخدوم اعظم; Makhdum-i-Nura (The Great Light); Hazrat Khoja Khavand Mahmud Shihab-ud-din حضرت خواجہ خاوند محمود شہاب الدین; Ahmad Kasani ? ? – 1542 CE.
Ishan-i-Kalān ایشان کلاں; Khoja Muhammad Amin محمد امین	Khoja Muhammad Ishaq Wali محمد اسحاق ولی ? – 1599 CE.
Khoja Muhammad Yusuf محمد یوسف ?CE.	Khoja Shadi
Afaq Khoja (Master of Horizons) آفاق خواجہ; Khoja Hidāyatullah هداية اللہ ? – 1693/94 CE.	Khoja Ubaydullah (Khoja Abdullah?)
The Zunghar Khanate under Galdan Boshugtu Khan had in 1680 conquered the Tarim Basin and allowed the Khojas administrative hold over the region beginning with Afaq Khoja.
Afaq Khoja (Master of Horizons) آفاق خواجہ; Khoja Hidāyatullah هداية اللہ ? – 1693/94 CE.
Khan Khojan خان خواجہ جان; Khoja Yahya خواجہ یحیی ? – 1693/94 CE.	Khoja Daniyal خواجہ دانیال
Khoja Akbash خواجہ اکباش	
Khoja Ahmed خواجہ احمد	
Khoja Daniyal خواجہ دانیال; The Zunghar Khanate under Tsewang Arabtan had in 1720 CE appointed Khoja Daniyal as administrator of Altishahr (or the Six Cities) but with Oirat overseers, thus making the Qara Taghliq as overall masters. 1720 – 1754 CE.
The Zunghar Khanate under Galdan Tseren divided the Altishahr region, after the death of Khoja Daniyal, among his sons, again with Oirat overseers. Thus Yarkand went to Khoja Chagan; Aqsu went to Khoja Ayub; Khotan went to Khoja Abdullah; and the main city Kashgar went to Khoja Yusuf since his mother was an Oirat Noyan.
Khoja Yusuf خواجہ یوسف; He would unite his brothers and the cities after an attempt was made on his life and his brother Khoja Chagan was kidnapped and imprisoned by the Oirats and chiefs of the cities who were against the authority of the Khojas. Yusuf was successful and in 1754–55 CE he freed the territory of Zunghar Khanate's hold. 1754 – 1757 CE
The Zunghar Khanate under Amarsana devised a plan to replace the Qara Taghliqs with Aq Taghliqs. He brought back the exiled sons of Khoja Ahmed from Irin Khabirghan on the head waters of the Ila river to the east of Ghulja. They were Khoja Burhan-ud-din and Khan Khoja. Khan Khoja was kept as hostage whereas Khoja Burhan-ud-din was sent with Oirat, Chinese and Turks to re-conquer the Altishahr which was achieved in 1758 CE.
Khoja Burhan-ud-din خواجہ برهان الدین; He along with his brother Khan Khoja rebelled against their Oirat and subsequently Qing dynasty Chinese overlords. But were eventually driven out of the region to Badakhshan where the ruler Sultan Shah killed them both. Kashghar was annexed as an integral part of the Chinese Empire under the Provincial Governor of Ili (region around Ili River). In this war four of the sons of the Aq Taghliq family were killed in fight and two were taken prisoners to Beijing for execution there. Only one son of Khoja Burhan-ud-din escaped; His name was Khoja Sa'adat Ali commonly called Sarimsak. He had escaped to Khanate of Kokand. He had three sons there; Yusuf Khoja who lived at Bukhara then there was Bahauddin and lastly Jahangir Khoja who would raise a rebellion against the Chinese in 1825 CE. 1758 CE.
The Qing dynasty to consolidate their authority in this western province of their Empire in 1764 CE built Hoi Yuan Chen on the Ili River and re-settled Oirats in the Dzungharia region, which had been depopulated by the massacre of half a million people by Chinese emigrants and exiles from Gansu, along with Sibo Solon and Daur colonists as well as a Manchu garrison of soldiers of the Green Dragon standard. In the Ili district seven thousand Muslim families were reduced to serfdom as tillers of the soil while the remnant of the Oirats were granted roaming tracts in their former locale. The General of Ili, essentially a Viceroy with three Lieutenants at Ili, Turbaghatai and Kashghar, was in overall control but the details of local government were left to be administered as before by Muslim officers. However, Chinese garrisons were located in the principal cities with outposts established on the frontiers and at post stages built on all the main routes for quick communication. These moves allowed the Chinese to secure their conquest. This success of the Chinese arms alarmed the Islam polity all over Central Asia although the border Chiefs immediately under their influence professed vassalage to the Chinese Emperor. In 1766, Abul-Mansur Khan of the Middle Horde submitted to the Qianlong Emperor and was granted the title of Prince. Nur Ali Beg (r.1748–1786) of the Little Horde in a token of submission sent envoys to Beijing, while in 1758, Irdana Beg of the Khanate of Kokand and then his successor Narbuta Beg recognized the protectorate of China. The rest of Central Asia was panic struck by the establishment of Chinese rule on their frontiers. In 1762 Chinese mandarins with an escort of a hundred and thirty men went to Abul-Mansur Khan and demanded horses and supplies for an army to invade Turkistan and Samarqand in the spring. As a result, Irdana Beg of the Khanate of Kokand and Fazl Beg of Khujand and the independent Kyrgyz Chiefs sent envoys to seek aid from the Durrani Empire of the Afghans who were at this time the most powerful nation of the East besides China. Ahmad Shah Durrani sent a force of Afghans to protect the frontier between Tashkent and Kokand. At the same time he sent an embassy direct to Beijing to demand the restitution of the Muslim States of Eastern Turkistan. Meanwhile, in 1765 the people of Ush-Turfan forestalling the Muslims aid reckoned on, rose in revolt but the rebellion was at once quelled by a massacre of the citizens and the complete destruction of the town. The Afghan deputation was not well received at the Chinese capital and Ahmad Shah Durrani was at the time too much engaged against the Sikhs to turn his attention in this direction; And the Chinese on their side were deterred from further conquest in the helpless States of Central Asia to the west by the presence of an Afghan army of fifteen thousand men in Badakhshan sent there to ravage the country and execute the King Sultan Shah in revenge for his murder of the two refugee Khojas in 1760. The Chinese brought under subjection, however, the Kyrgyz on the north west and yearly sent a force from Kashghar and Turbaghatai accompanied by Chinese traders for barter to collect the annual revenue of 1% of horses and cattle and one per mille of sheep in return for the privilege of pasturing on the steppe between Lake Balkash and the Alatagh. Thus Chinese rule remained undisturbed till 1816 CE.
Khoja Zia-ud-din Akhund خواجہ ضیاء الدین آخوند; He was from Tashmalik or Tashbaligh aka stone town to the west of Kashghar. He rebelled and with a party of Kyrgyz raided the Chinese outposts. He was soon captured and executed but his son Ashraf Beg carried on the war till he shared the same fate. His young brother, however, was sent to Beijing where he was executed on attaining full age. 1816 CE.
Qing dynasty ruled without disturbance again till 1825 CE.
Jahangir Khoja خواجہ جہانگیر; Syed Jahangir Sultan سید جہانگیر سلطان; With the help of his Khanate of Kokand and Kyrgyz allies he took Kashgar in 1825.On the fall of Kashghar the people of Yangihissar, Yarkand and Khotan rose simultaneously and massacring the Chinese everywhere razed their forts and joined the service of the Khoja. But the Khoja immediately ran into trouble with his allies from Khanate of Kokand and they began to fight amongst themselves. By September, 1827, the Chinese collected in Aksu an army of 70,000, under command of military governor of Ili, Chang Ling, and in January, 1828, moved against Jahangir Khoja. He was defeated at the Battle of Yangabad and fled in despair till his own Kyrgyz allies fearing the Chinese, handed him over to them. He was taken to China and Daoguang Emperor was pleased of the Chinese success had the Khoja first tortured and then executed. The Chinese recovering possession of the revolted cities re-established their authority by numerous executions and tortures and confiscations and by the transportation of twelve thousand Muslim families from Kashghar region to Ghulja where they were settled as serfs under the name of Taranchi or those who sweat i.e. laborers. 1825 – 1828 CE.
Qing dynasty rule restored.
Yusuf Khoja خواجہ یوسف; Muhammad Ali Khan, the Khan of Kokand had recently annexed Kyrgyz territories and now decided in 1829 to attack the Chinese. For this purpose he invited Yusuf Khoja the elder brother of Jahangir Khoja from Bukhara and set him on the throne of his ancestors. Yusuf took the field in September 1830 with a force of 20,000 men mostly Andijan and Tashkent troops with some Karatigin levies and Kashghar refugees all under the command of Mingbashi Haq Quli Beg, a brother in law of Muhammad Ali Khan. The Chinese with 3,000 men advanced to oppose them but were defeated at Mingyol and the invaders pushing on seized Kashghar where Yusuf was at once set on the throne. Yangihissar, Yarkand, Khotan and Aksu up to the Muzart Pass quickly fell into his possession and the Chinese as before were everywhere massacred while the arrival of their troops from Ghulja was delayed for want of carriage. This advance of the Kokand army roused the hostility of Emirate of Bukhara against Andijan and Muhammad Ali Khan to avert the attack threatened by Nasr-Allah Khan bin Haydar Tora at once recalled his General Haq Quli Beg and Yusuf unable to hold his position unsupported amongst the fickle Muslims of Kashghar returned with him in November or December after a rule of only ninety days. 1830 CE.
Qing dynasty changed its policy in the region due to the rising influence and power of the Khanate of Kokand under Muhammad Ali Khan and practically gave up control of the trade and certain revenues of the region in a treaty to him in 1831–32 CE. On his part Muhammad Ali Khan was to restrain the Khojas and he consequently strictly watched their movements.
Zuhur-ud-din ظہور الدین; 1832 – 1846 CE.
Revolt of Haft Khojajan (Revolt of the Seven Khojas); It was conducted by that number of the members of the Aq Taghliqs. The eldest of these was Ehsan Khan Khoja commonly called Katta Tora or Great Lord and amongst the others were Khoja Buzurg Khan, Khoja Wali Khan, Khoja Kichik Khan and Khoja Tawakkul Khan all of whom subsequently figured in the conquest of the country by Yaqub Beg Atalik Ghazi. 1846 CE.
Eshan Khan Khoja خواجہ ایشان خان; Katta Tora now assumed the government in Kashghar and appointed the others to the surrounding towns and settlements. He and his kinsmen began to pillage the houses of the government officials appointed by the Chinese and seizing their wives and daughters to stock their harems at once abandoned themselves to a course of unbridled licentiousness and debauchery their troops the while besieging the Chinese garrison shut up in the Mangshin. But within 75 days the Chinese arrived and defeated the Khojas at the Battle of Kok Rabat. 1846 CE.
Qing dynasty rule restored.
Ahmed Wang احمد وانگ; 1846 – 1857 CE.
Khoja Wali Khan خواجہ ولی خان; During 1855–56 Khoja Wali Khan and his brother Khoja Kichik Khan made several attempts to invade Kashghar but on each occasion were repulsed at the frontier pickets owing to their numerical weakness. In the spring on 16 May 1857, however, Khoja Wali Khan after performing the prayers of Ramadan set out from Kokand with seven Kashghar emissaries and a small band of trusty adherents to carry out a preconcerted enterprise against the Chinese. They arrived at the Ocsalar Fort belonging to Kokand on the Ush-Turfan and Kashghar road at night and surprising the little garrison killed the commandant and won over the soldiers to join the Khoja. Gradually his ranks swelled. At the same time some scouts sent out by the Chinese were captured and brought to Wali Khan who inaugurated his bloody career by at once striking off their heads with his own hand. He then pushed on and crossing the Kizil ford surprised the picket there as they slumbered under the effects of their opium pipes and slew every soul of them and at dawn appeared before the Kum Darwaza or Sand Gate on the south side of the city of Kashgar. He took the city and was welcomed as Buzurg Khan Tora. In the confusion Ahmad Wang the Muslim governor on the part of the Chinese with a few others escaped by the opposite gate and took refuge in the Mangshin or Yangishahr with the Chinese garrison. He began to consolidate his rule and sent commanders to take remaining Chinese forts. But the Chinese relief force rescued the besieged and recovered lost territories forcing Wali Khan to flee but was captured and brought before Muhammad Khudayar Khan, the Khan of Kokand. And thus after a rule of only a 115 days in September, 1857 ended the last of the Khoja revolts. May – September 1857 CE.
Qing dynasty rule restored until 1865 when Yaqub Beg became commander-in-chief of the army of the Kokand Khanate. Taking advantage of the Hui Uprising in western China, he captured Kashgar and Yarkand from the Chinese and gradually took control of most of the region, including Aqsu, Kucha, and other cities in 1867. He made himself the ruler of Kashgaria with its capital in Kashgar. At about this time he received the title of Atalik Ghazi.

- Blue row signifies progenitor of the Khojas of Altishahr.
  - Green rows signify The Aq Taghliqs.
    - Pink rows signify the Qara Taghliqs.
      - Orange rows signify Chinese governors.

== See also ==
- Khawaja
- Jahangir Khoja
- Khwaja Ahmad Yasavi (a Sufi Shaykh who was held in high esteem among Central Asian Turkic peoples)
- Turkistan or Yasi, birthplace of Yasavi, in present-day Kazakhstan
- Khoja Nasreddin
- Dzungar conquest of Altishahr
- Āfāqī Khoja Holy War
- Fragrant Concubine

== Literature ==
- Kim Hodong, "Holy War in China: The Muslim Rebellion and State in Chinese Central Asia, 1864–1877". Stanford University Press (March 2004). ISBN 0-8047-4884-5. (Searchable text available on Amazon.com)
- Gladney, Dru. "The Salafiyya Movement in Northwest China: Islamic Fundamentalism among the Muslim Chinese?" Originally published in "Muslim Diversity: Local Islam in Global Contexts". Leif Manger, Ed. Surrey: Curzon Press. Nordic Institute of Asian Studies, No 26. pp. 102–149.
- Ahmad Kasani in Encyclopædia Iranica (special fonts required to properly view)
- Azim Malikov, Kinship systems of Xoja groups in Southern Kazakhstan in Anthropology of the Middle East, Volume 12, Issue 2, Winter 2017, pр.78-91
- Azim Malikov, Sacred Lineages in Central Asia: Translocality and Identity in Mobilities, Boundaries, and Travelling Ideas: Rethinking Translocality Beyond Central Asia and the Caucasus edited by Manja Stephan-¬Emmrich and Philipp Schröder (Cambridge: Open Book Publishers), 2018, pp. 121–150
- Azim Malikov, Khoja in Kazakhstan: identity transformations in Max Planck Institute for Social Anthropology Department 'Integration and Conflict' Field Notes and research Projects VI CASCA – Centre for Anthropological Studies on Central Asia: Framing the Research, Initial Projects. Eds.: Günther Schlee. Halle/Saale, 2013, pp. 101–107
