= Tuman River =

River in Kashgar Prefecture, Xinjiang, China

Coordinates: 39.4875°N 75.9676°E

Tuman
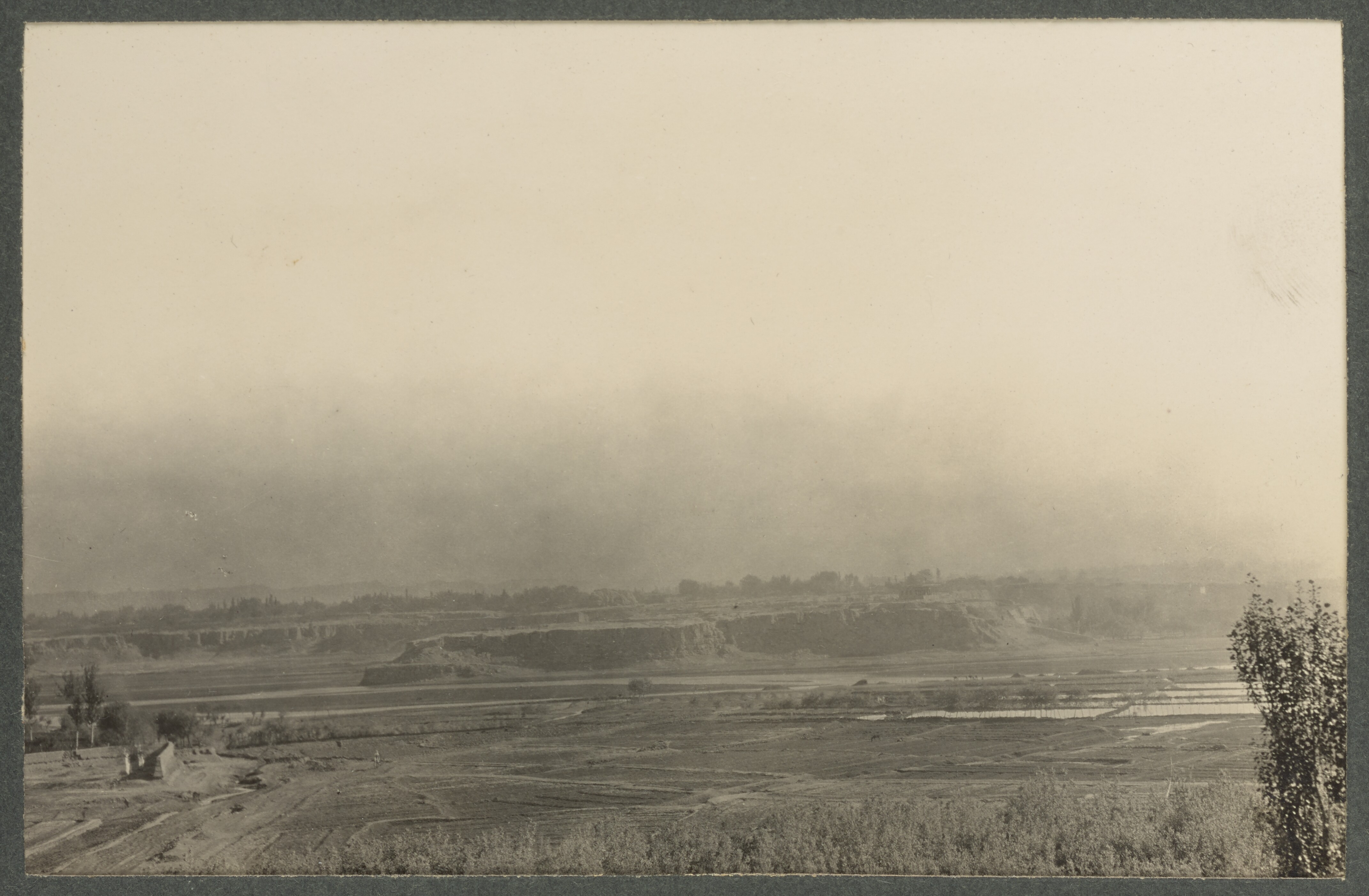

Location
- Country: China

Physical characteristics
- Mouth: Kashgar River

Basin features
- Progression: Kashgar→ Yarkand→ Tarim→ Taitema Lake

The Tuman River (Chinese: 吐曼河; pinyin: Tǔmàn Hé; Uyghur: تۇمەن دەرياسى, romanized: Tumen Deryasi) is a river in Kashgar Prefecture, Xinjiang, China. The name comes from the Uyghur word "tuman" (تۇمان, Тумән) meaning "fog". The Tuman is a minor tributary of the Tarim Basin. It is 77.6 kilometres (48.2 mi) long and receives the water from 487 square kilometres (188 mi^{2}) of land. The oasis city of Kashgar is located on the Tuman's south bank.
