= Ma Shaowu =

Chinese Muslim warlord (1874–1937)

- 馬紹武
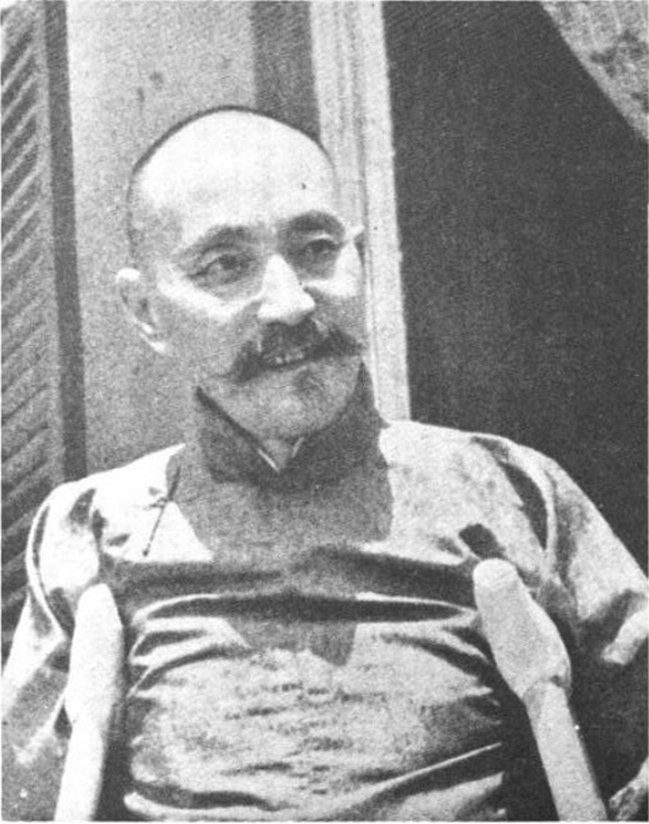
- Gen. Ma Shaowu

Tao-yin of Kashgar
- In office 1924–1933
- Preceded by: Ma Fuxing

Personal details
- Born: c.1874 Yunnan, Qing China
- Died: 1937 (age 62–63) Xinjiang, Republic of China
- Party: Xinjiang clique, Kuomintang
- Spouse: Single unknown wife
- Children: Ma Cho-ya

Military service
- Allegiance: Qing Dynasty; Republic of China
- Years of service: 1912-1937
- Rank: Military commander
- Unit: Kashgar Garrison
- Commands: Military commander at Kucha and Tao-yin of Kashgar
- Battles/wars: Xinhai Revolution; Kirghiz rebellion; Kumul Uprising; Battle of Kashgar (1933); Battle of Kashgar (1934)

Ma Shaowu
- Traditional Chinese: 馬紹武
- Simplified Chinese: 马绍武
Transcriptions
Standard Mandarin
- Hanyu Pinyin: Mǎ Shàowǔ
other Mandarin
- Xiao'erjing: ﻣَﺎ ﺷَﻮْ ءُ

Ma Shaowu (1874–1937; Xiao'erjing: ﻣَﺎ ﺷَﻮْ ءُ) was a Chinese warlord and military commander who was a member of the Xinjiang clique during China's Warlord Era and the Xinjiang Wars.

== Family history ==
The Jahriyya Sufi leader Ma Yuanzhang was related to the leader of the Dungan revolt, Ma Hualong, which made him related to Ma Shaowu, who was also related to Ma Hualong.

== Couplet written in Honor of Ma Shaowu by Ma Yuanzhang ==
Ten thousand li to pay his respects at the isolated tomb and satisfy the wish of the founding ancestor,
Those that satisfy the wishes of their ancestors are truly filial.
In the home province he built up the embankment in honour of the departed sage,
Not only by showing respect for the departed but in his countenance he is a true worthy descendant.

万里祭孤坟而绍祖志，能绍先志方称孝子
原籍修河堤而祭前圣，亦能继前亦象乃为贤孙.

== Official in Xinjiang ==
He took the military exams.

He became a military commander in the Qing Dynasty army and that of the Republic of China. He served as a mandarin official. During Yang Zengxin's reign in Xinjiang, Ma was appointed military commander of Kucha and then Daotai of Kashgar. His authority extended over all of southern Xinjiang and he commanded several hundred Hui and Han Chinese soldiers. Brig. Gen. Yang and Col. Chin served under him. He was loyal to the Chinese government and a Muslim.

Ma Shaowu had replaced fellow Hui Ma Fuxing as Daotai, after shooting him on Yang Zengxin's orders.

Ma enforced anti-Soviet measures and preserved Chinese sovereignty in Xinjiang when the Soviet Union tried to encroach on Chinese territory. He jailed a Uighur called Akbar Ali, who was employed by the Soviet consulate, for setting off a Uighur riot. The Uighurs were suppressed by 400 Hui troops.

In 1932, Ma crushed a Kirghiz revolt led by Id Mirab and jailed several Kirghiz fighters including Osman Ali.

When Ma Zhongying invaded the province in 1932, Ma Shaowu—himself a Hui Muslim—commanded predominantly Han Chinese troops against the anti-provincial Uighur and Hui forces. He steadily lost control over southern Xinjiang, despite Jin Shuren appointing him as Commander in Chief of all Chinese forces in the area, and was panicking. He sent Han Chinese troops to Khotan and Maral Bashi to fight against the anti-provincial forces, withdrew Chinese troops from Sarikol to Kashgar to reinforce the garrison and raised levies of Kirghiz.

Ma faced an army of Uighurs and Hui from Gansu under the command of Timur Beg and Ma Zhancang, when Ma Zhancang defected to Ma Shaowu after conducting negotiations and shot and beheaded Timur Beg. Ma Shaowu commanded a Han Chinese garrison; his subordinates included Brig. Gen. Yang and Col. Chin. Then all of the Hui Muslims and Han Chinese gathered together and holed up in the yamen, while the Turkic Muslims, the Kirghiz and Uighurs besieged them. During this time Ma Shaowu resigned as Tao-yin of Kashgar. When the independence of the First East Turkestan Republic was declared the following year, at the Battle of Kashgar (1934) Ma Zhancang and Ma Fuyuan destroyed the Turkic army, massacring over 2,000 Uighurs and attacking the British consulate. Ma Fuyuan and Ma Zhancang then reinstated Ma Shaowu as Tao-yin of Kashgar. In 1934 Ma Shaowu was seriously injured in an assassination attempt ordered by Sheng Shicai. Ma was sent to the Soviet Union for treatment, and recovered but on crutches.

He was walking with his son and wife when the assassination attempt happened. The child was unhurt, the wife slightly wounded and, even though Ma was shot in the legs, he dragged himself into a maize field. He got home on a donkey, a doctor was summoned and by the end of summer he was convalescing. Nobody was apprehended by the police for the attack. Two of his fingers were lost.

Ma was interviewed by traveler Peter Fleming in 1936, shortly after the assassination attempt. Fleming also visited the site of the assassination, where bloodstains were still present. He wore a long beige silk robe, had a spittoon and spoke in precise Peking speech. His son's name was Cho-ya. He was then sent to Moscow in the Soviet Union to complete medical treatment. He did not give direct answers, replying through a translator that "I lost my post when, as a result of the troubles, China lost her authority in Kashgar", referring to when he had to resign as taotai. After being sent to Moscow by train, he returned to Ürümqi in 1936. In 1937, during the Xinjiang War (1937), Ma Shaowu was accused by Soviet puppet Sheng Shicai of being part of a "Fascist-Trotskyite" network, including Khoja Niyas Hajji, Ma Hushan, along with other claims, which Sheng Shicai used as an excuse to conduct his own purge in Xinjiang along with Joseph Stalin's Great Purge.

Ma Shaowu was killed on Sheng Shicai's orders.

== Legacy ==
In 2006, Anthony Garnaut was told by Ma Shaowu's son that Ma Shaowu's biography was being written in Kashgar, and the son and his wife live in Ürümqi.

== See also ==
- Xinjiang clique
- Ma clique
- Yang Zengxin
- Kashgar
- Yunnan
- Jahriyya
