= Tunganistan =

Exonym for a historical part of Xinjiang

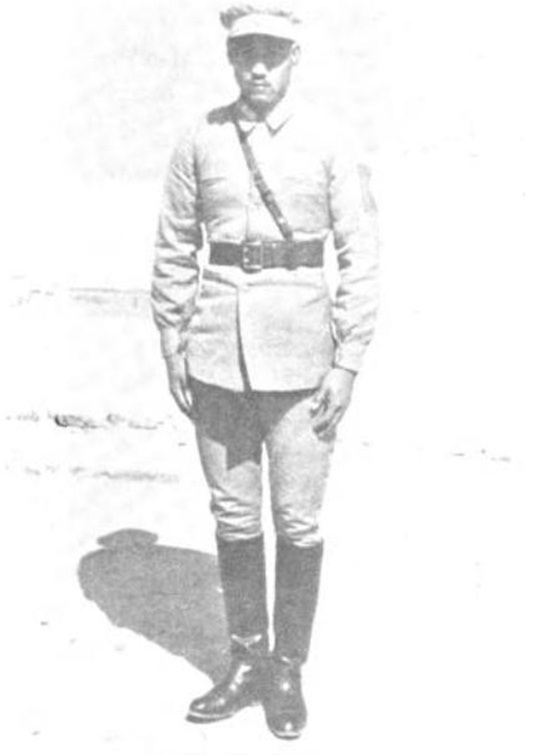
Ma Hushan in 1937

Tunganistan (or Dunganistan) is an exonym for the territory in southern Xinjiang administered by the New 36th Division of the National Revolutionary Army from 1934 to 1937, amidst the Chinese Civil War in China proper. The New 36th Division consisted almost exclusively of Hui Muslim soldiers and was led by the Hui Muslim warlord Ma Hushan. At the time, the Hui were known as the "Tunganis" in Western literature, hence the name "Tunganistan".

== Etymology ==
"Tunganistan" is an exonym generally attributed to Western writers contemporaneous with the New 36th Division's administration. Western literature at the time used the exonym "Tungani" to describe the Hui. According to scholar of Central Asian and Islamic studies Andrew Forbes, "Tunganistan" was coined by the Austrian Mongolist Walther Heissig. However, another scholar of Central Asian studies, Shirin Akiner, asserts that the term was also used by the Turkic Muslims of the area.

== Territory ==
The New 36th Division's territory was centered around the oasis of Khotan, where a garrison command was established. the New 36th Division also administered the counties surrounding Khotan, including Kargilik, Maralbeshi, Guma, Karakash, Keriya, Charkhlik and Charchan. Ma Hushan's domain was surrounded on three sides by troops loyal to Chinese warlord Sheng Shicai and to the south by the Tibetan Plateau.

== History ==
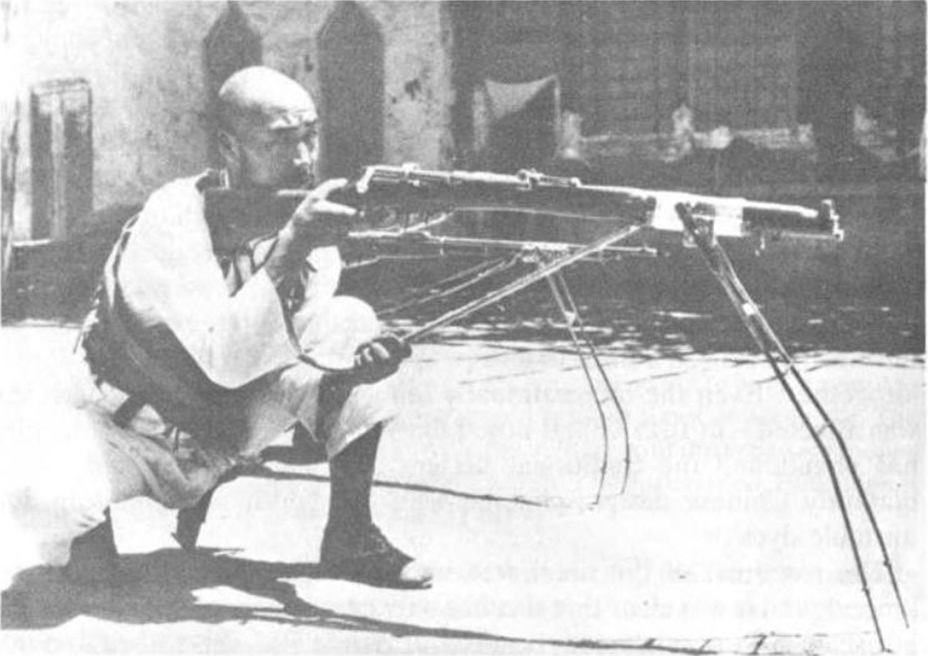
Hui rifleman of the New 36th Division

The 1911 Revolution in Xinjiang concluded with the Qing governor of Gansu and Xinjiang fleeing from the regional capital of Dihua (Ürümqi) and the warlord armies of the Xinjiang clique gaining control. The Xinjiang clique was nominally allegiant to the Republic of China but regularly defied orders from Nanjing. In the early 1930s, the Kuomintang (KMT), the then ruling party of China, conspired with the Hui Muslim warlord Ma Zhongying and his Hui Muslim-majority New 36th Division to overthrow the then governor of Xinjiang, Jin Shuren. Jin had unilaterally signed an arms treaty with the Soviet Union, to the chagrin and anger of the KMT. Ma attempted but was unable to take Dihua in 1933, but Jin retreated to China proper following the battle and was promptly arrested by the KMT. Ma expanded his domain with a number of military victories in Xinjiang, notably in Kashgar in 1934, when his forces ended the First East Turkestan Republic. However, Ma disappeared following the Soviet invasion of Xinjiang that same year.

Ma Hushan succeeded his half-brother Ma Zhongying as the commander of the New 36th Division and retreated from Kashgar to Khotan. Hushan regularly received telegrams, ostensibly from his brother-in-law in the Soviet Union, promising that Zhongying would soon return. However, Zhongying never did return and Hushan administered Zhongying's former domain from 1934 to 1937.

The Hui Muslim officers of the New 36th Division governed the Turkic Muslims of their territory like colonial subjects. Locals referred to Ma as padishah (lit. 'king'). Taxation was heavy in order to support the needs of the New 36th Division. Farmers and merchants were exploited for the benefit of the military garrisons. Forced conscription was also commonplace.

By 1935, local inflation was out of control, homesick troops of the New 36th Division were deserting, and Uyghurs frequently fought with soldiers in the streets of Khotan. A Uyghur revolt erupted in Charkhlik (present-day Ruoqiang County) and was promptly put down by the New 36th Division.

== See also ==
- Hui nationalism
- Ma clique
