= Ma Ju-lung =

Ma Ju-lung or Ma Rulong may refer to:

- Ma Ju-lung (actor) (1939–2019), Taiwanese actor
- Ma Ju-lung (Nationalist general), Hui general for the Nationalist government
- Ma Rulong (Qing general), Hui general for the Qing dynasty
- Ma Yue-lung, name of the protagonist in the 1991 film Inspector Pink Dragon
