= Karakash =

Karakash may refer to:

- Karakash County, county in Hotan Prefecture, Xinjiang, China
- Karakash River, river in Xinjiang, China
