= Ma Sheng-kuei =

- Born: Gansu
- Military career
- Allegiance: Republic of China
- Service years: 1933–1937
- Rank: General
- Unit: 2nd Brigade of the 36th Division (National Revolutionary Army)
- Commands: General of the 2nd brigade in the 36th Division (National Revolutionary Army)
- Conflicts: Kumul Rebellion, Xinjiang War (1937)

Ma Sheng-kuei (Chinese: 馬生貴; pinyin: Ma Shenggui, Xiao'erjing: ﻣَﺎ ﺷْﻊ ﻗُﻮ) was a Chinese Muslim general of the 36th Division (National Revolutionary Army), who served under Generals Ma Zhongying and Ma Hushan. His grew up in Gansu and Shaanxi in "bad company". Ma practiced banditry was noted for torturing his victims in Ningxia. He joined Ma Zhongying in 1933, and was appointed commander of the Tungan 2nd brigade at Khotan. His troops seized the Fayzabad-Maral-Bashi area. Facing the Soviet Red Army and Sheng Shicai's provincial troops, he defected while at Fazayabad and joined the forces of Sheng Shicai, turning against Ma Hushan's forces at Kashgar. Later Ma was stationed in Khotan and it is thought that he went back to Gansu. According to British diplomatic files he possibly received bribes from Sheng to join Sheng's forces.
