= Xinjiang clique =

Chinese warlord clique (1911–1944)

Xinjiang Clique
- Flag of the Xinjiang People's Anti-Imperialist Association (1933–1944) Provincial Government Seal
- Active: 1911–1944
- Disbanded: 1944
- Country: Xinjiang Province, Republic of China
- Allegiance: Beiyang government (1912–1915, 1916–1928); Empire of China (1915–1916); Nationalist government (1928–1934, 1942–1944); Soviet Union (1934–1942)
- Type: Warlord faction
- Motto: Always loyal (永遠忠誠)
- Engagements: 1911 Revolution; Xinjiang Wars: Kumul Rebellion; Soviet invasion of Xinjiang; Islamic rebellion in Xinjiang (1937)

Commanders
- Provincial Governor (1912–1928): Yang Zengxin
- Provincial Chairman (1928–1933): Jin Shuren
- Military Governor (1933–1944): Sheng Shicai

The Xinjiang clique or Sinkiang clique was a military clique that ruled Xinjiang during China's warlord era. Unlike other cliques, its leaders were from outside the province.

== History ==
During the Xinhai Revolution in 1911, the Qing governor fled from Dihua (Ürümqi). A band of Yunnanese led by Yang Zengxin quelled the rebellion and established himself as the provincial leader. President Yuan Shikai recognized Yang as governor. Yang was one of the few who supported Yuan's attempt to become emperor. During the National Protection War, he purged officers who sympathized with the Yunnan clique's leader Cai E. After Yuan's death, he recognized whichever government ruled in Beijing and maintained an isolationist and neutrality policy which kept Xinjiang away from the upheavals experienced in the rest of China.

Ma Fuxing and Ma Shaowu, both of them Hui Chinese, were members of the clique. They held military and political positions under Yang.

Yang held absolute power in the region and kept the keys to the radio station on him at all times. He read every message himself and got rid of any which he did not like.

Yang's future deputy, Fan Yaonan, had been studying in Japan when he was appointed as military attache of Xinjiang by Li Yuanhong. Fan heavily disliked Yang's government policy of keeping the people ignorant and tried to bring in more progressive ideas to the region. Li Yuanhong hoped that Fan would eventually kill Yang and replace him as governor of Xinjiang. Aspiring for higher positions, Fan sped up the process and on 7 July 1928, days after Yang recognized the Nationalist (KMT) government in Nanjing, Fan shot Yang dead during a banquet at the Xinjiang Academy of Politics and Law. Also present at the banquet were Chinese officials along with the Soviet consul-general and his wife. The consul-general and his wife were able to escape.

Following Yang's assassination, Jin Shuren, Yang's second in command, had Fan and his coconspirators killed. After that, he declared himself the provincial governor and was quickly recognized by the KMT. Jin wholly mismanaged the province by causing high inflation, banning the hajj, and replacing local officials with Han officials. In 1931, the alienated Muslim majority rebelled against Jin. Gansu warlord Ma Zhongying of the Hui Ma clique invaded in support of the rebellion. Soon, various other groups rebelled against Jin, often fighting against each other including the breakaway First East Turkestan Republic.

Jin was deposed by mutineers in 1933 and was succeeded by Sheng Shicai. Sheng was not a protégé of either Yang or Jin. He was initially an officer under Guo Songling and defected with Guo to the Guominjun. He was appointed by Nanjing to serve under Jin as late as 1930. The war continued unabated with Nanjing unable to resolve the conflict. Frustrated, Sheng turned to the Soviet Union in 1934. With Soviet support, Ma Hushan was defeated in 1937. Sheng turned Xinjiang into a Soviet protectorate and safe haven for the Chinese Communist Party.

With Germany's invasion of the Soviet Union in 1941, Sheng decided to rejoin the Kuomintang after purging the CCP cadres and executing Mao Zemin, which was done to prevent him being overthrown due to their high administrative positions in Xinjiang. Chiang Kai-shek could not trust Sheng, who tried renegotiating with Joseph Stalin, so he deposed him and installed direct rule in 1944. The new KMT administration then faced a rebellion that formed the Second East Turkestan Republic.

== See also ==
- Warlord era
- Incorporation of Xinjiang into the People's Republic of China

== Works cited ==
- History of Civilizations of Central Asia. Unesco. 1992. p. 390. ISBN 9789231039850.
- Wood, Frances (2002). The Silk Road: Two Thousand Years in the Heart of Asia. University of California Press. p. 224. ISBN 9780520243408.
- Starr, Stephen (2015). Xinjiang: China's Muslim Borderland. Taylor & Francis. p. 71. ISBN 9781317451372.
