= Kyrgyz rebellion in Xinjiang =

1932 civil conflict in China

Kyrgyz rebellion
| Date | 1932 |
| Location | Tian Shan, Xinjiang |
| Status | Chinese victory |

Belligerents
| China: National Revolutionary Army; Soviet Union | Kyrgyz rebels |

Commanders and leaders
| (Republic of China (1912–1949)) Jin Shuren (Republic of China (1912–1949)) Ma Shaowu | Id Mirab Osman Ali (WIA) |

Strength
| Between 500 to 1000 Chinese troops | 10,000 Kyrgyz irregulars |

Casualties and losses
| Unknown | Heavy casualties |

The Kyrgyz Rebellion (Kyrgyz: Кыргыз көтөрүлүшү, romanized: Kyrgyz kötörülüşü); (Chinese: 柯爾克孜叛亂) occurred when Kyrgyz irregulars in Xinjiang revolted against the Republic of China in March 1932. The Kyrgyz rebels, led by Id Mirab, revolted in the Tian Shan mountains as part of the wider Kumul Rebellion in Xinjiang, until they were quickly defeated by government forces led by Ma Shaowu, the Hui military commander of Kashgar, with some minor assistance of the Soviet Union.
