= Mazar Tagh =

Site of a ruined hill fort in China

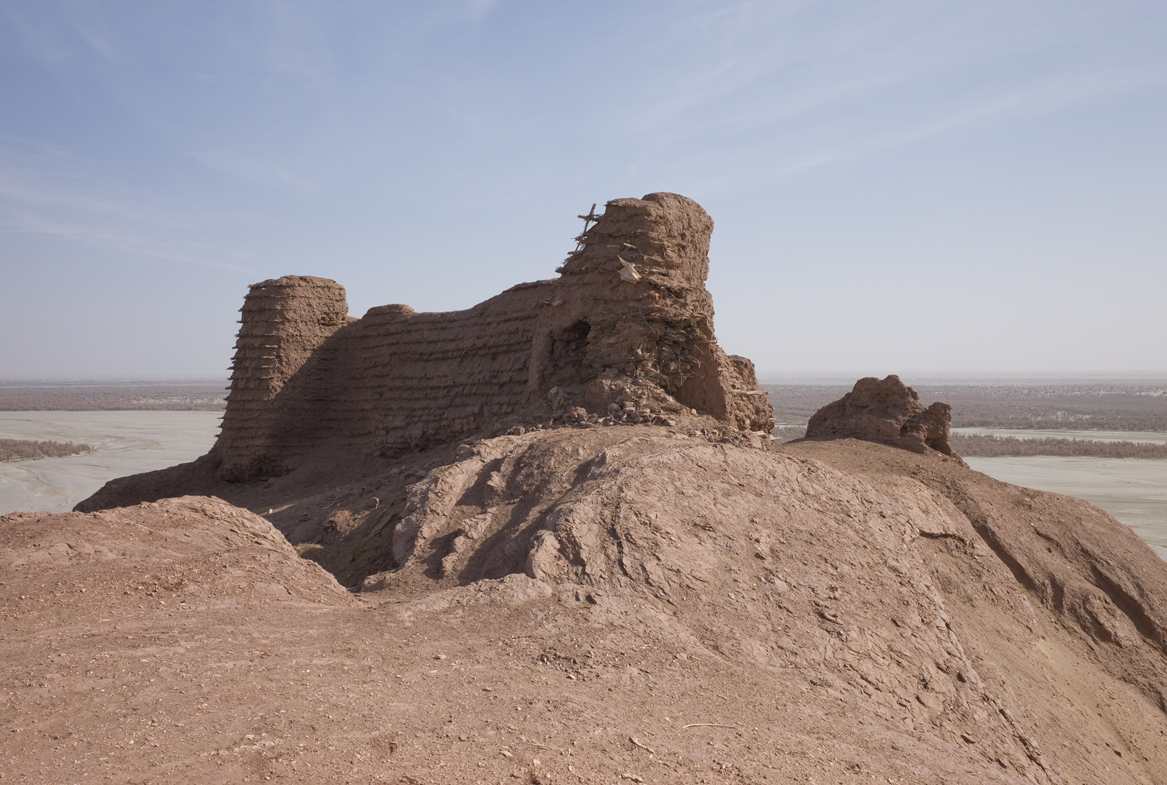
- The fort at Mazar Tagh (1913)

- Location of Mazar Tagh Fort
- 38.450759°N 80.862550°E
- Location: China
- Region: Karakax County (Moyu), Hotan Prefecture, Xinjiang

Mazar Tagh is the site of a ruined hill fort in the middle of the Taklamakan desert, dating from the time of the Tibetan Empire. Like the Miran fort site, its excavation has yielded hundreds of military documents from the 8th and 9th century, which are among the earliest surviving Tibetan manuscripts, and vital sources for understanding the early history of Tibet. The site is now located north of the modern city of Hotan in the Xinjiang Autonomous Region of the People's Republic of China.

== History ==
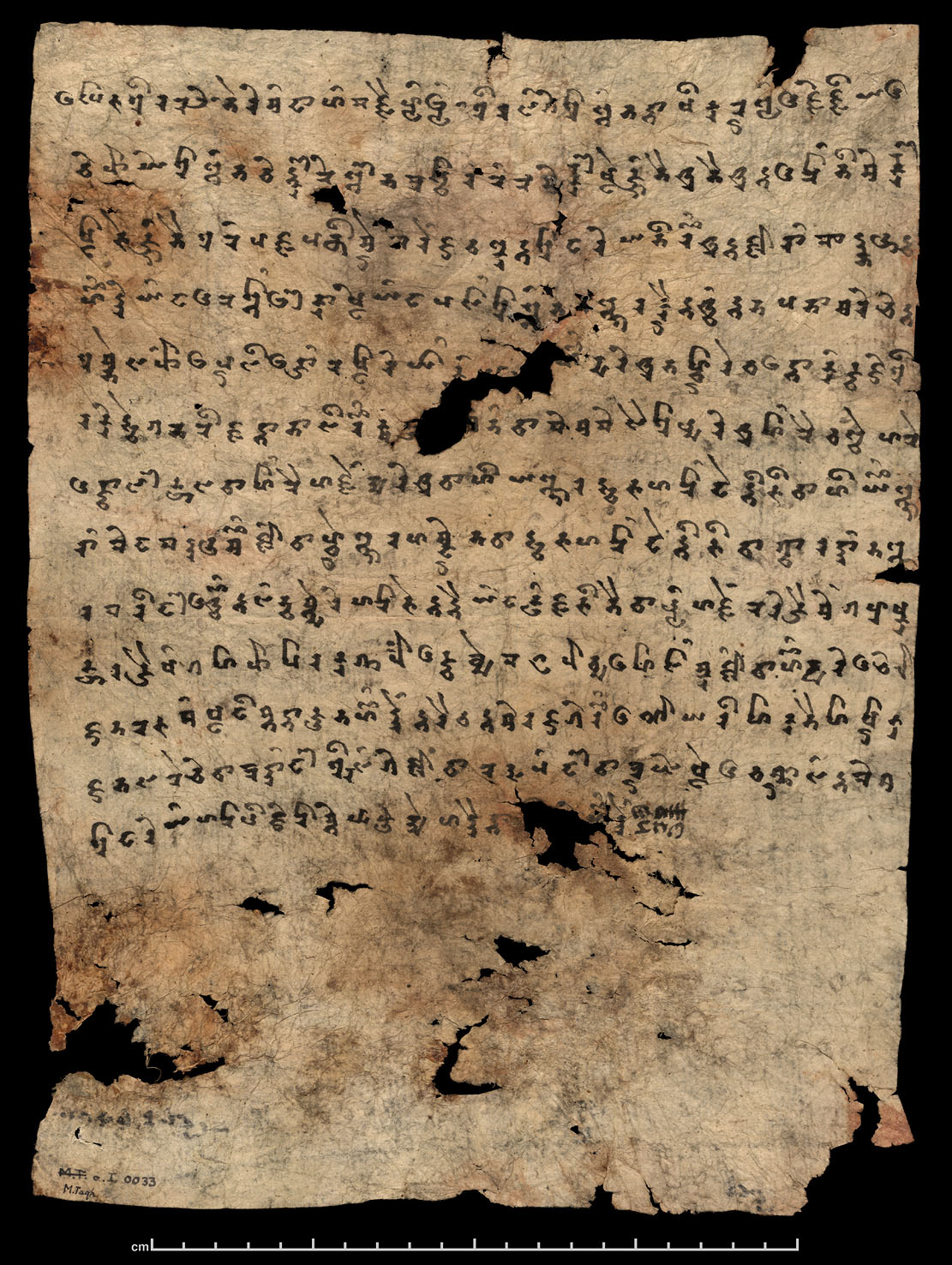
Mazar Tagh find: IOL Khot 41

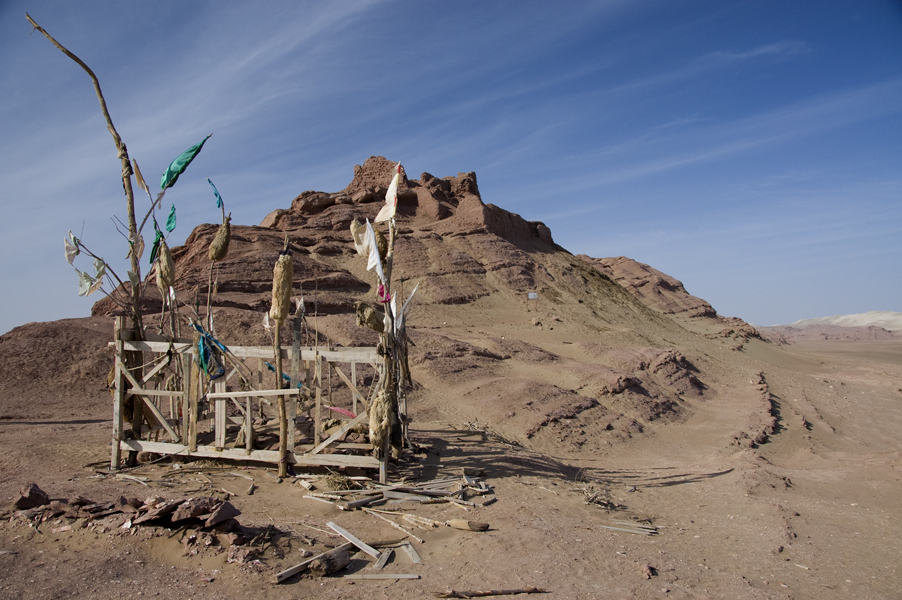
Modern Islamic shrine at Mazar Tagh

Mazar Tagh was part of the ancient Kingdom of Khotan during the first millennium AD. Before the Tibetan army built a fort there, it seems to have been a Buddhist pilgrimage site known locally as "the Hill". During the Tibetan Empire, the fort at Mazar Tagh was the main Tibetan military outpost for the Khotan region, performing a similar role to the Tibetan fort at Miran. During the Tibetan occupation, Mazar Tagh, like Miran, was home not only to soldiers but also to their families, civilian officials, and merchants. Aurel Stein wrote of the presence of an Islamic shrine on the hill at the time of his first visit in 1907, and noted modern Turkic name Mazar Tagh means "Hill of the Sacred Shrine". The hill still contains a functioning Islamic shrine (Mazar).

== Archaeology ==
Mazar Tagh was excavated by Aurel Stein in 1907 during his second Central Asian expedition, and again in 1913 during his third expedition. The fort contained five rooms (i to v in Stein's discussions) and a watchtower, which is still partially standing. As well as excavating the fort, Stein discovered a large refuse heap on the north and northeast slopes of the hill, which contained hundreds of discarded Tibetan military documents on paper and wood. The British Library holds 1,168 wooden documents under the pressmark IOL Tib N, and 321 paper documents under the pressmark Or.150000, found in the fort itself as well as the rubbish heap. Stein also recovered fragments of Khotanese, Uyghur and Sogdian documents from the site. Several of the Khotanese texts refer to the rule of the Tibetan "masters". Stein also discovered other kinds of artefact, though in much smaller number, including arrows, sheathes, shoes, dice, a comb and a pen. These items are now at the British Museum under the pressmarks MAS.480 to MAS.509.

== See also ==
- Silk Road transmission of Buddhism
- Mazartag
