= Yang Zengxin =

Chinese warlord (1864–1928)

- 楊增新
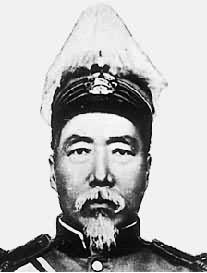
- Yang Zengxin

Governor of Sinkiang
- In office 18 May 1912 – 7 July 1928
- Preceded by: Yuan Dahua
- Succeeded by: Jin Shuren

Personal details
- Born: March 6, 1864 Mengzi, Yunnan
- Died: July 7, 1928 (aged 64) Ürümqi, Xinjiang
- Manner of death: Assassination
- Party: Xinjiang clique
- Profession: Magistrate
- Awards: Order of the Precious Brilliant Golden Grain Order of Wen-Hu

Military service
- Allegiance: Qing Dynasty (Beiyang government) Republic of China; Empire of China

Yang Zengxin (traditional Chinese: 楊增新; simplified Chinese: 杨增新; pinyin: Yáng Zēngxīn; Wade–Giles: Yang Tseng-hsin; March 6, 1864 – July 7, 1928) was a Chinese warlord who was the ruler of Xinjiang after the Xinhai Revolution in 1911 and during the Warlord Era until his assassination in 1928.

== Life ==
Yang Zengxin was born in Mengzi, Yunnan Province, in 1864. Though a Han Chinese, he had connections with the leading Muslim families of Yunnan. He was knowledgeable about Islam and Islamic culture. He passed the imperial examination and became a jinshi degree holder in 1899.

== Magistrate in Gansu ==
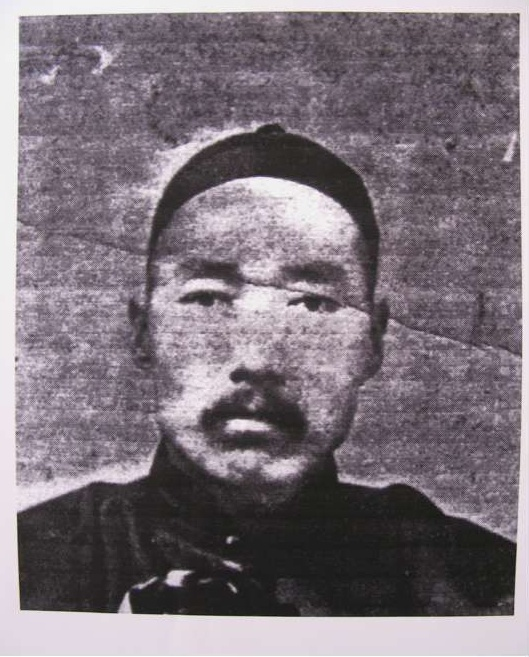
A younger Yang Zengxin

Hezhou Prefecture Magistrate Yang Zengxin wrote an essay on Sufi menhuan dated 1897.

== Governorship of Xinjiang ==
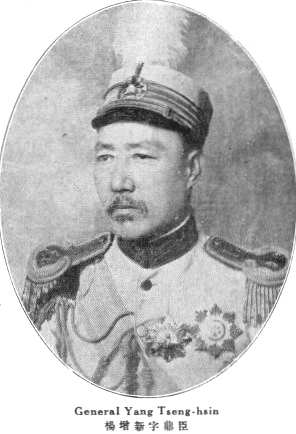
Yang Zengxin

In 1907 Xinjiang was where the Qing assigned Yang Zengxin. He effectively fabricated Xinjiang's boundaries in its modern form by having the posts of Altay minister, Tarbagatai councilor and Ili general destroyed and having their self-rule directly to Beijing removed.

Ma Yuanzhang, a Sufi Jahriyya Shaykh, gave his support to Yang Zengxin to seize power in Xinjiang. This enabled Yang to immediately raise a massive army of Hui Muslim troops, mainly from Jahriyya mosque communities.

The Muslim General Ma Anliang, in cooperation with magistrate Yang Zengxin, attempted to arrest and execute the Yihewani(Ikhwan in Arabic) leader Ma Wanfu. Ma Qi, one of Ma Anliang's subordinates, staged a rescue operation and brought Ma Wanfu to Xining. Ma Anliang and Yang Zengxin were both monarchists and did not trust republicanism, and had served in the Qing military together.

Yang came to power after he defeated the revolutionaries who caused the last Qing dynasty governor, Yuan Dahua, to flee during the Xinhai Revolution in Xinjiang on 18 May 1912. The Ili revolutionaries (Yili uprising and Dihua uprising) and the Gelaohui in Xinjiang were eliminated by Yang. He appointed Ma Fuxing military commander of 2,000 Chinese Muslim troops, whose purpose was to crush Yang's rivals. In 1913 the revolt of Tömür Khälphä in Qumul was crushed by Yang with the help of the Turpan-based Ma Yuanzhang's religious representative "ra'is" Jin Yunlun (金云仑). President Yuan Shikai recognized Yang's rule and in return he supported Yuan's revival of the monarchy by inviting Republican anti-Yuan rebels to a banquet and decapitating them on New Year's Day, 1916. Yang believed a monarchy was the best system for China, and some western travelers noted — with approval— that Yang was a former Mandarin, unlike the Republican governors of the other provinces.

Yang was made a Count of the First Rank (一等伯; Yī děng bó) by Yuan Shikai during Hongxian era.

In 1917, President Li Yuanhong assigned Fan Yaonan (樊耀南) to observe Yang and, if possible, replace him. Yang always recognized whichever faction was in power in the Beiyang government to avoid trouble. His rule kept the region relatively peaceful, compared to other parts of China which were war-torn. However, he ruled dictatorially and executed many dissidents. Taxes for Kazakhs, Uighurs and other minorities were lowered. People were forbidden to abuse minorities, and he warned his Muslim subjects on the Soviet Russians, saying, "Beware of associating themselves with a people who are entirely without religion and who would harm them and mislead their women".

During the Russian Civil War, Yang had a friendly stance towards the new Soviet state. In 1920–21, more than thirty thousand White Russians fled to Xianjiang. Some of them were disarmed and interned, other were offered a safe return, while others, those who fled to the Altai mountains, were persecuted with the help from the Red Army.

He recognised Russian economic dominance in Xinjiang, while concluding a provisional trade deal which established Soviet consulates in the Ili Valley and two Chinese consulates in Semipalatinsk and Verkhne-Udinsk. The Chinese government initially denied the impacts of the unrecognised agreement, but later accepted it. In 1924, Soviet economic advantages over Xinjiang were expanded by the new agreement, which also established Soviet consulates in Ürümqi, Kulja, Chuguchak, Shara-Sume and Kashgar, in return, Chinese consulates were opened in Semipalatinsk, Tashkent, Alma-Ata, Zaysan and Andijan. As of 1927, these Chinese officials acted independently from the Chinese government, following instead orders from Ürümqi.

Yang relied heavily on Hui people—Chinese Muslims—to enforce his rule in Xinjiang. They were disliked by both Han and Uighurs because they had high positions within the Xinjiang military and government under Yang.

A Tungani (Hui) was the military commander at Khotan in 1920.

On July 1, 1928, he recognized the Nationalist Government in Nanjing. Six days later he was killed in a coup attempt by Fan Yaonan during a banquet. Fan had risen high in Yang's regime, but Yang never trusted him. The motive seemed to be Yang's denial of the pro-Nationalist Fan to a Nationalist advisory council designed to keep Xinjiang in check. Yang's death was avenged by Jin Shuren almost immediately. Lacking resources to oust Jin, Nanjing recognized his succession to the governorship.

Yang had weaker control over the south of Xinjiang. Yang appointed Ma Fuxing to a key position in Kashgar. Beginning in 1915, Ma administered power in southwest Xinjiang harshly, including executing his enemies with a hay cutting machine. Yang ordered Ma Shaowu to assassinate Ma Fuxing in 1924. Ma Shaowu was then appointed Daotai of Kashgar.

== Statement on Hui people ==
"The third reason is that at the time that Turkic Muslims were waging rebellion in the early years of the Guangxu reign, the 'five elite divisions' that governor general Liu Jintang led out of the Pass were all Dungan troops [Hui dui 回队]. Back then, Dungan military commanders such as Cui Wei and Hua Dacai were surrendered troops who had been redeployed. These are undoubtedly cases of pawns who went on to achieve great merit. When Cen Shuying was in charge of military affairs in Yunnan, the Muslim troops and generals that he used included many rebels, and it was because of them that the Muslim rebellion in Yunnan was pacified. These are examples to show that Muslim troops can be used effectively even while Muslim uprisings are still in progress. What is more, since the establishment of the Republic, Dungan have demonstrated not the slightest hint of errant behaviour to suggest that they may prove to be unreliable."
