= Ma Fuxing =

Chinese warlord

Ma Fuxing 馬福興
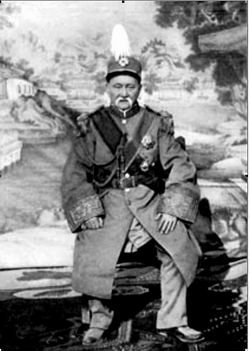

Tao-yin of Kashgar
- In office 1916–1924
- Succeeded by: Ma Shaowu

Personal details
- Born: 1864 Yunnan
- Died: 1924 (aged 59–60) Kashgar, Xinjiang
- Party: Xinjiang clique
- Spouse: Harem of Wives
- Children: Many

Military service
- Allegiance: Qing Dynasty (Beiyang government) Republic of China
- Years of service: 1916–1924
- Rank: Military commander
- Unit: Kansu Braves, Kashgar Garrison
- Commands: Military commander
- Battles/wars: Boxer Rebellion, Xinhai Revolution in Xinjiang

Ma Fuxing
- Traditional Chinese: 馬福興
- Simplified Chinese: 马福兴
Transcriptions
Standard Mandarin
- Hanyu Pinyin: Mǎ Fúxīng
other Mandarin
- Xiao'erjing: ﻣَﺎ ﻓُﻮْ سٍ

Ma Fuxing (Chinese: 馬福興; Ma Fu-hsing in Wade Giles; 1864–1924) was a Hui born in Yunnan, in Qing dynasty China. He was an ex-convict. During Yang Zengxin's reign in Xinjiang, Ma was appointed as a military commander, and then Titai of Kashgar. Known for his brutality, including the execution of his perceived enemies using a hay cutting machine, Ma also developed resource industries in Xinjiang. In 1924, Yang sent forces to remove Ma from power in southwestern Xinjiang and kill him.

== Background ==
Ma was a Yunnanese Muslim.

Ma served as a general for the Qing dynasty. He joined the Kansu Braves during the Boxer Rebellion, under the command of Gen. Ma Fulu and fought against the foreign forces during the Siege of the International Legations (Boxer Rebellion) and Battle of Peking.

After the fall of the Qing dynasty he started working for Yang Zengxin and recruited Dungan troops for him in 1911, and was posted in 1916 to Kashgar. In 1924 Yang intercepted some correspondence between Ma and the Zhili clique and became suspicious.

Ma Fuxing was appointed as the commander of 2,000 Hui soldiers by Yang Zengxin.

== Reign ==
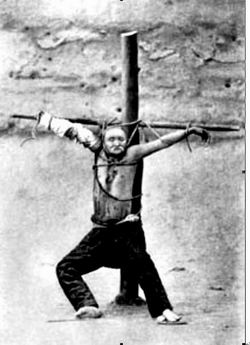
Ma Fuxing after being shot.

His reign was notorious for its repressiveness and his excesses. He kept a harem of Uighur wives, and a hay cutting machine for severing the limbs of his victims. The limbs were put on display, along with notices on why they were severed, on the city walls.

Ma developed resource industries in the region including oil wells, an oil refinery, and coals and copper mines. He established government monopolies over industries such as petroleum, and made people purchase paraffin wax.

Ma demanded that people call him padishah (meaning 'King').

== Downfall ==
Yang Zengxin decided that Ma's excesses were too great, and sent Ma Shaowu, another Hui military commander, to attack and replace him. Ma Shaowu attacked Ma Fuxing, and then personally executed him by shooting him after receiving a telegram from Yang Zengxin. Ma Fuxing's body was tied to a cross to be put on display. Ma Shaowu then was appointed Daotai of Kashgar.

== See also ==
- Xinjiang clique
- Ma clique
- Yang Zengxin
- Ma Shaowu
- Kashgar
