= Mazartag =

- 麻扎塔格山 (Chinese)
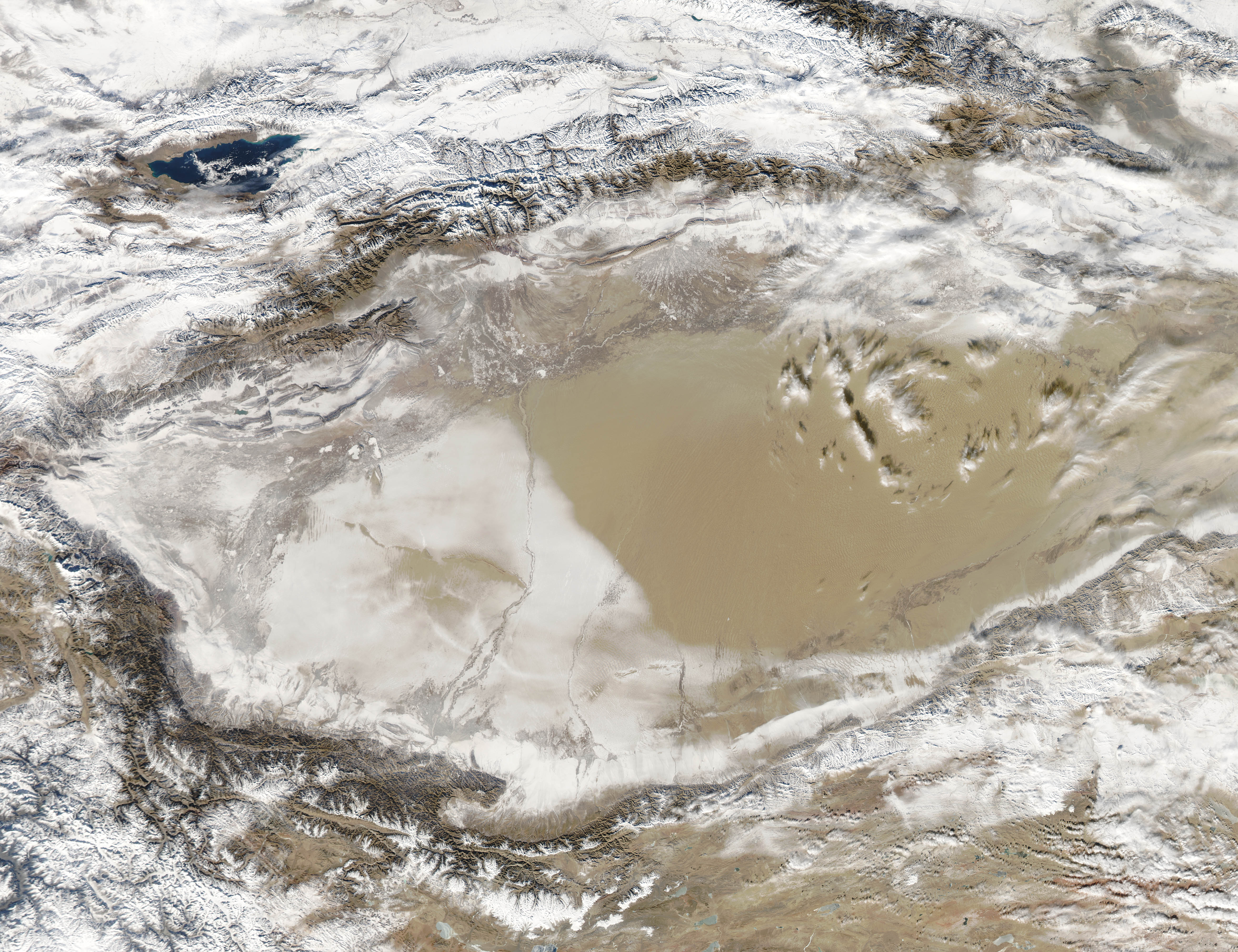
- Mazartag (area not covered by snow in the snow-covered part of the desert)

Highest point
- Elevation: 1,635 m (5,364 ft)

Dimensions
- Length: 145 km (90 mi)
- Width: 3 km (1.9 mi)

Naming
- Native name: مازارتاغ (Uyghur)

Geography
- Location within China
- Country: China
- Region: Xinjiang
- District(s): Karakax County (Moyu), Hotan Prefecture
- Range coordinates: 38°38′N 80°28′E

Geology
- Rock type: Composed mainly of sandstones

Mazartag (Uyghur: مازارتاغ, Мазартағ, Mazartagh; Chinese: 麻扎塔格山; pinyin: Mázhātǎgé Shān, Ma-cha-t'a-ko) is an arc-shaped mountain range located in the western part of the Tarim Basin, between the Hotan and Yarkand river valleys, Xinjiang, China. It is some 145 km long and 3 to 5 km wide; the highest peak rises to 1,635 m. The range is mainly composed of sandstone.

== Historical maps ==
Historical English-language maps including Mazartag:

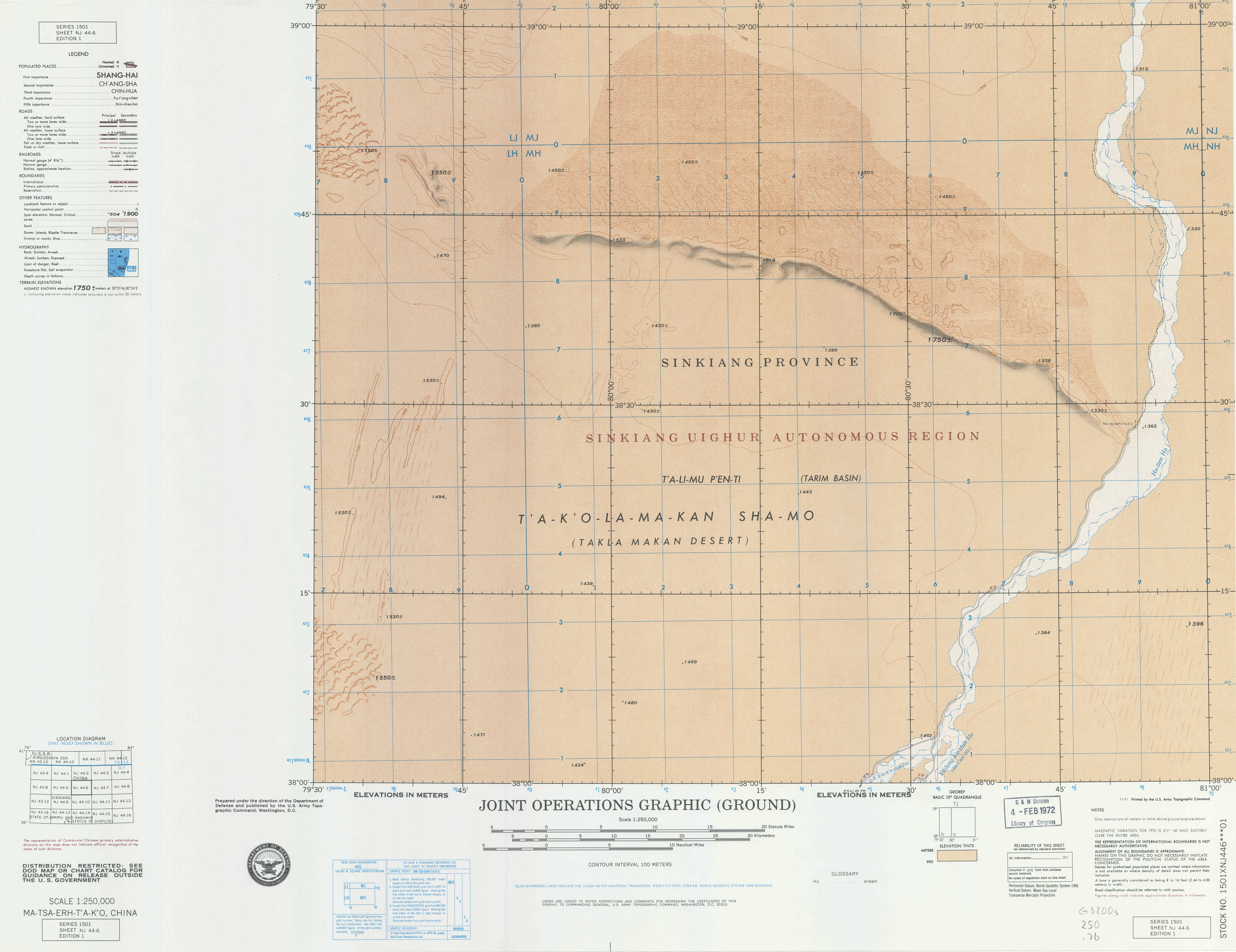
Map including Mazartag (ATC, 1971)

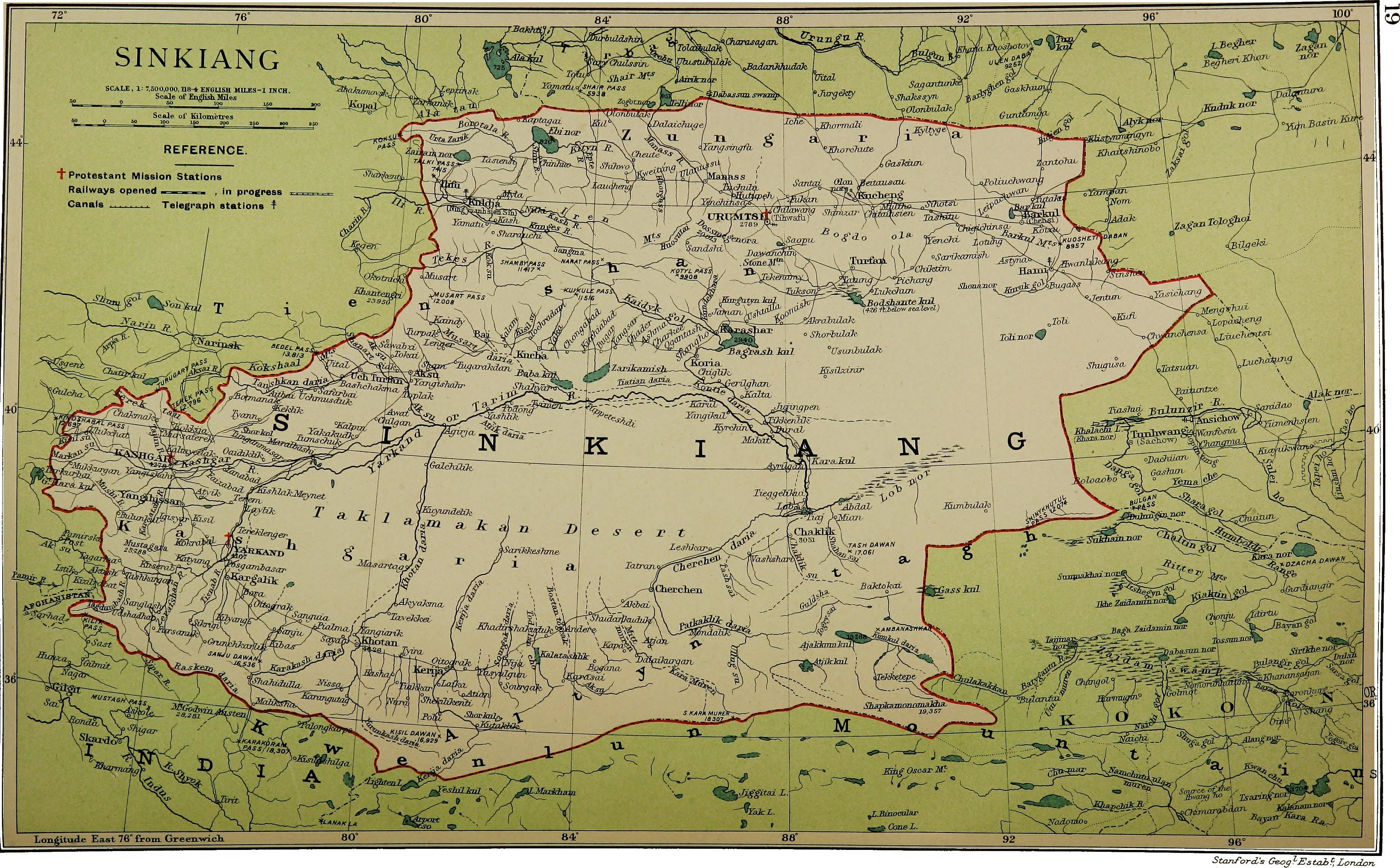
Map including Mazartag (labeled as Masartag) (1917)

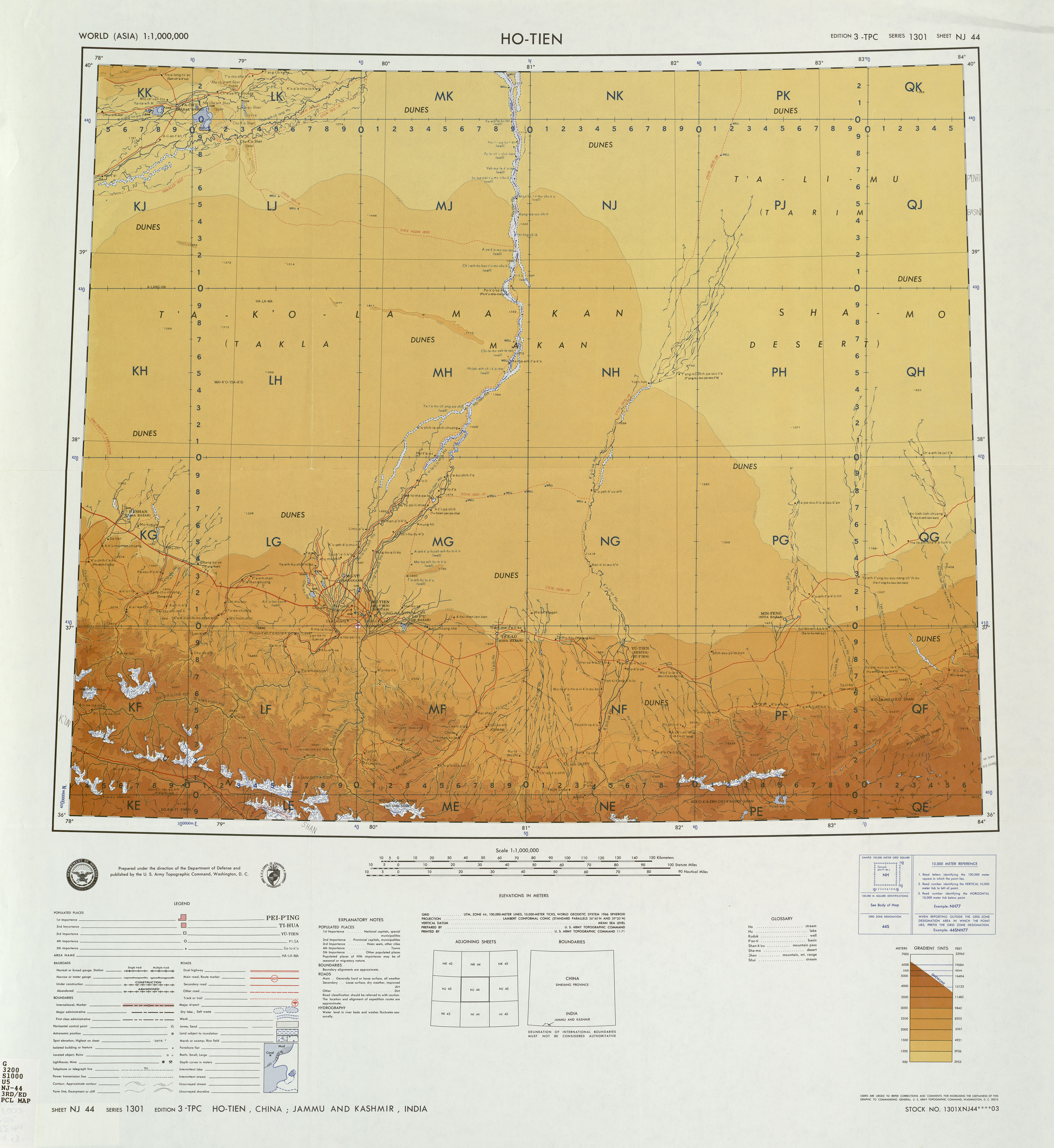
Map including Mazartag (USATC, 1971) (Note: From map: "DELINEATION OF INTERNATIONAL BOUNDARIES MUST NOT BE CONSIDERED AUTHORITATIVE".)

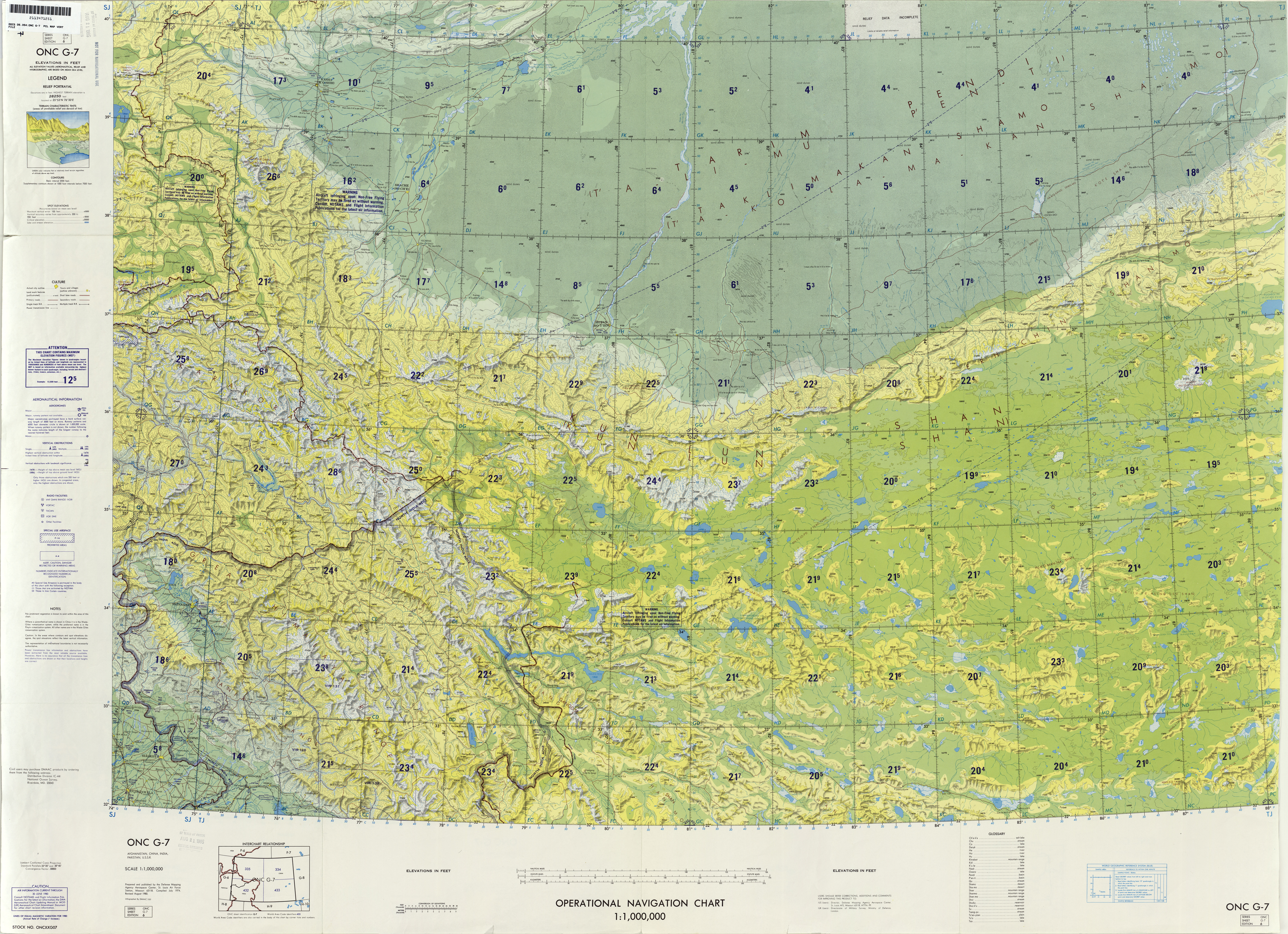
From the Operational Navigation Chart; map including Mazartag (DMA, 1980) (Note: From map: "The representation of international boundaries is not necessarily authoritative.")

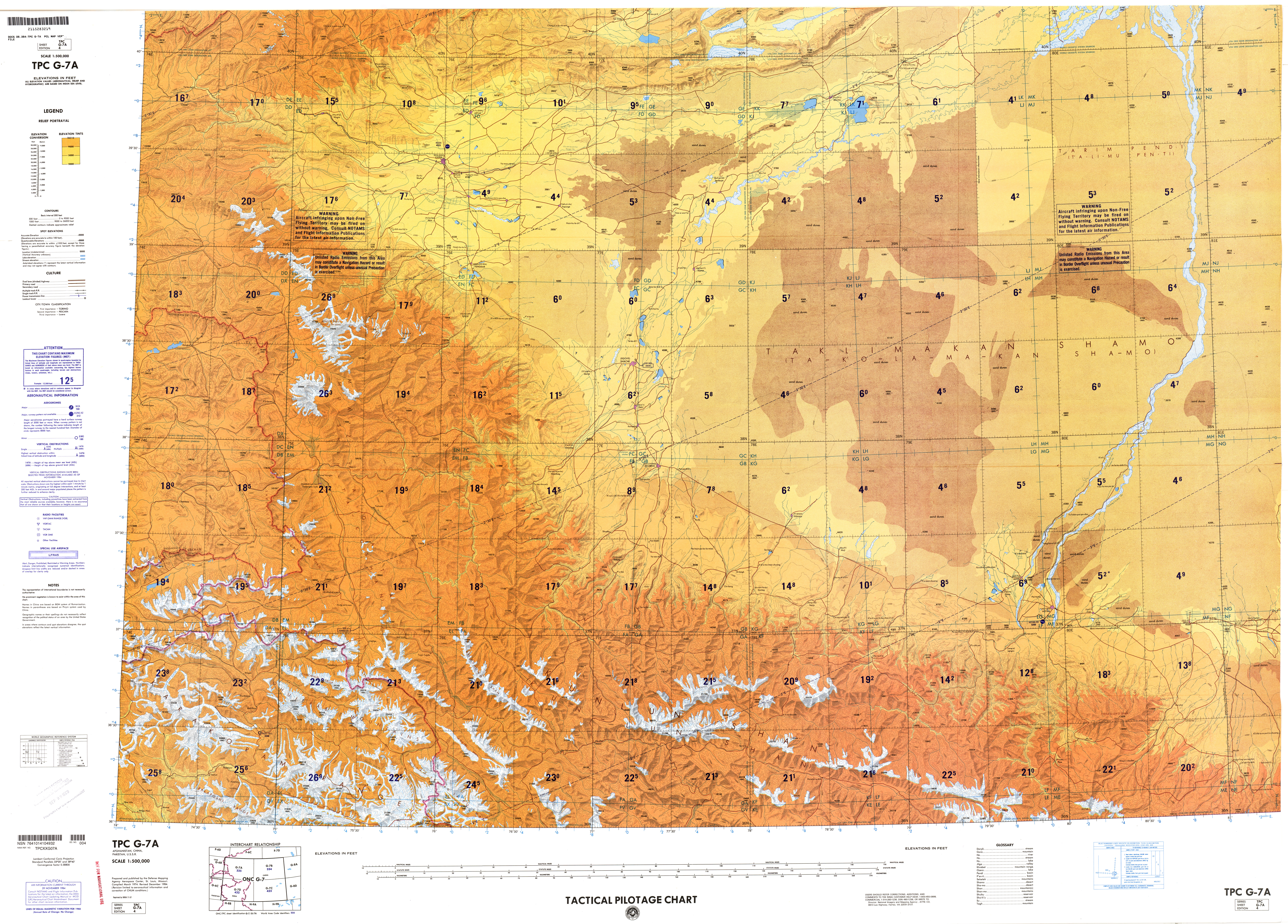
Map including Mazartag (DMA, 1984) (Note: From map: "The representation of international boundaries is not necessarily authoritative")

== See also ==
- Mazar Tagh
