= Charkhlik revolt =

- Part of Xinjiang Wars
| Date | 1935 |
| Location | Charkhlik, Xinjiang |
| Result | Republic of China victory |

Belligerents
| (Republic of China (1912–1949)) Republic of China: Ma clique | Uighur rebels |

Commanders and leaders
| (Republic of China (1912–1949)) Ma Hushan | Unknown |

Units involved
| National Revolutionary Army: New 36th Division | Non-centralized insurgency |

Strength
| Around 10,000 Chinese Muslim cavalry and infantry | Unknown number of Uighur fighters |

Casualties and losses
| Unknown | Heavy casualties |
- Executions of 100 Uighurs and several Uighurs families being held hostage

The Charkhlik revolt (Chinese: 婼羌暴動) was a Uighur uprising in 1935 against Chinese Muslim-dominated Tunganistan, which was administered by the New 36th Division. The Chinese Muslim troops quickly and brutally defeated the Uighur revolt. Over 100 Uighurs were executed. The revolt leader's family were made hostages.
