= Ma Rulong (Nationalist general) =

- Born: Gansu
- Military career
- Allegiance: China
- Service years: 1933–1937
- Rank: general
- Unit: 1st Brigade of the 36th Division (National Revolutionary Army)
- Commands: General of the 1st brigade in the 36th Division (National Revolutionary Army)
- Conflicts: Kumul Rebellion, Xinjiang War (1937)

Ma Rulong (Wade–Giles: Ma Ju-lung, Xiao'erjing: ﻣَﺎ ژُﻮْ ﻟْﻮ) was a Chinese Muslim general of the 36th Division (National Revolutionary Army), who served under Generals Ma Zhongying and Ma Hushan. He commanded the 1st Brigade.
