= Miran Fort =

Archaeological site in Xinjiang, China

Miran fort
- 米兰古城遗址 (Japanese)
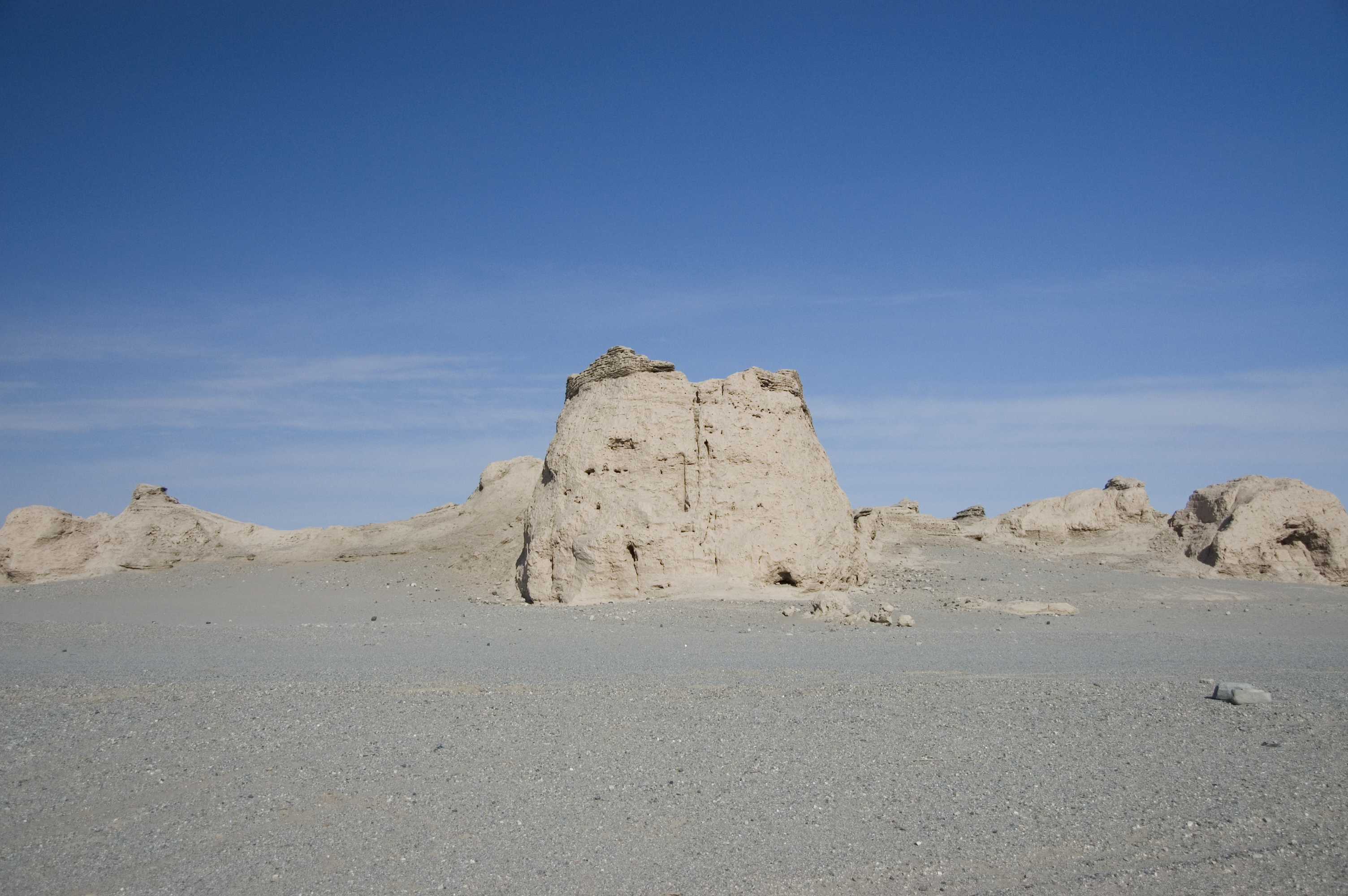
- Miran fort from the south (2008)

- Location of Miran Fort
- 39.226904°N 88.970863°E
- Location: China
- Region: Xinjiang

Miran fort aka "Ruins of Miran" (米兰古城遗址) is a ruined defensive structure in Miran, Xinjiang, China. The fort was active during the Tibetan Empire, in the 8th and 9th centuries AD. It is similar in structure to the fort at Mazar Tagh, which was also used by the Tibetan army in the same period. Like the Mazar Tagh site, the excavation of the fort at Miran has yielded hundreds of military documents from the 8th and 9th century, which are among the earliest surviving Tibetan manuscripts, and vital sources for understanding the early history of Tibet.

== Excavations by Marc Aurel Stein ==
Aurel Stein was the first archaeologist to study the ruins at Miran systematically. The fort was first visited briefly by Stein on December 8, 1906, during his second expedition. A trial excavation of the fort (site number M.I.) uncovered eight rooms and over a hundred Tibetan woodslips. Stein returned on January 22, 1907, and carried out a thorough excavation of the fort, uncovering 44 rooms (site numbers M.I.i - M.I.xliv) discovering many more Tibetan woodslips, as well as other miscellaneous objects. In 1914, when Stein visited during his third expedition, he concentrated on the other sites at Miran. In the fort Stein found Tibetan documents on wood and paper, fragments with a Turkish runic script, palm-leaf documents inscribed with Brahmi characters and Kharosthi texts on silk. The majority of the manuscript finds from Miran are official Tibetan documents and military information from the fort, written in early Tibetan script on wood or paper, dating from the eighth and ninth centuries. These are some of the earliest examples of the Tibetan script. Manuscripts kept at the British Library include 1,101 wooden documents in the IOL Tib N sequence and 295 paper documents in the Or.150000 sequence. Several artefacts from the fort are now held at the British Museum, in the pressmarks between MAS.590 and MAS.626.

== Excavations by Chinese expeditions ==
In 1957-58 Professor Huang Wenbi led a team from the Institute of Archaeology, CASS, spending six days at Miran, and a report was published in 1983 describing the fort and two stupa/temple sites, and a number of finds. In 1959 a team from Xinjiang Museum spent ten days in Miran examining the fort, temple site and dwelling areas. A report of their considerable findings was published in 1960. In 1973 another team from the Xinjiang Museum visited the site an investigated the fort, temples and irrigation system. The excavations and the artefacts found in these sites were discussed in an expedition report by Mu Shunying in 1983. The most extensive investigation of the site so far was carried out in 1978-80 by Huang Xiaojing and Zhang Ping of the Xinjiang Museum. Their 1985 report discusses the fort, 8 stupas, 3 temple sites, 2 beacons, dwellings, tombs, a kiln area and a smelting site.
