= 1937 Islamic rebellion in Xinjiang =

Part of the Xinjiang Wars

Islamic rebellion in Xinjiang (1937)
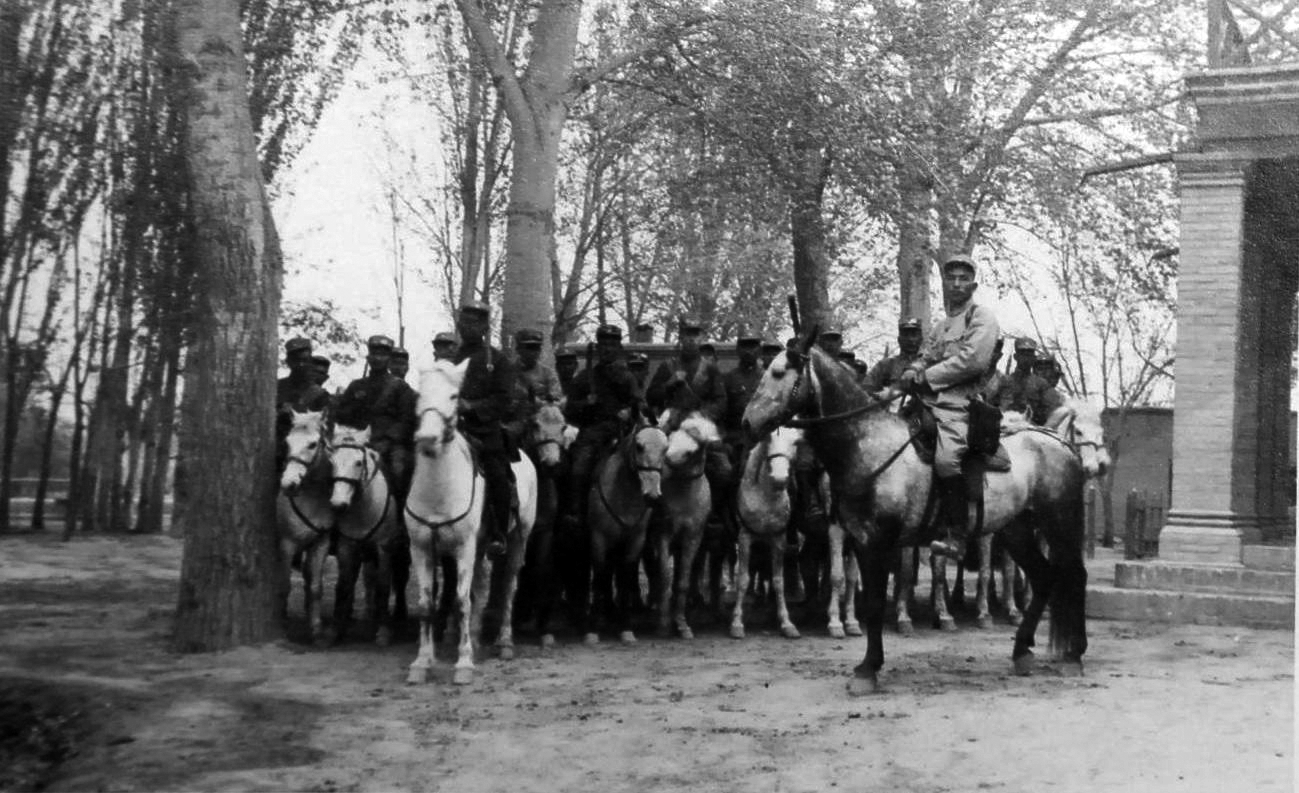
- Abdul Niyaz with his soldiers in Kashgar
| Date | April 2 – October 15, 1937 (6 months, 1 week and 6 days) |
| Location | Xinjiang |
| Result | Provincial government victory |
| Territorial changes | Sheng Shicai's pro-Soviet regime establishes its rule over the whole territory of Xinjiang province. |

Belligerents
| Republic of China Muslim Turkic rebels | Xinjiang clique Soviet Union |

Commanders and leaders
| (Republic of China (1912–1949)) Chiang Kai-shek (Republic of China (1912–1949)) Ma Hushan (Republic of China (1912–1949)) Ma Ju-lung (Republic of China (1912–1949)) Pai Tzu-li Kichik Akhund; Abdul Niyaz † | Sheng Shicai; Ma Sheng-kuei (Soviet Union) Joseph Stalin |

Units involved
| (Republic of China (1912–1949)) National Revolutionary Army: New 36th Division | Red Army; White Army; Xinjiang Army |

Strength
| ~10,000 Chinese Muslim cavalry and infantry 1,500 Turkic rebels | 5,000 Soviet Red Army troops Several thousand White Russian soldiers and provincial Chinese troops |

Casualties and losses
| ~2,000 casualties | Provincial government: ~500; Soviet and White Russian forces: ~300 |

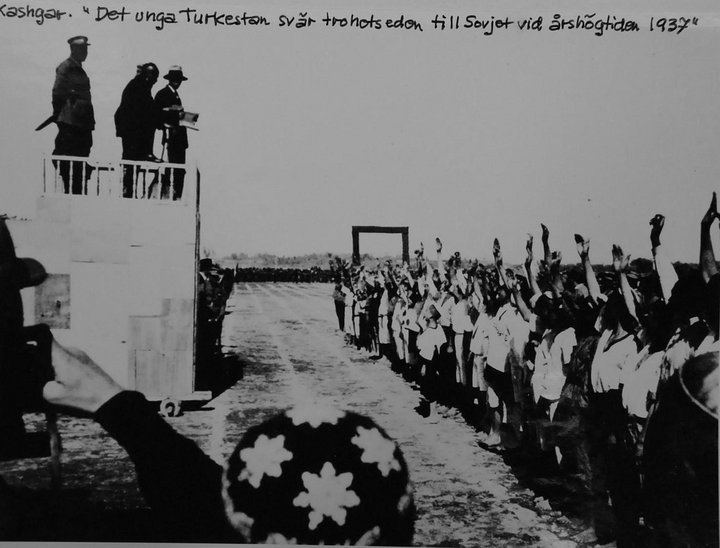
Xinjiang soldiers swearing loyalty to the Soviet Union 1937

In 1937, 1,500 Uyghur Muslim rebels under the command of Kichik Akhund rebelled in southern Xinjiang against the pro-Soviet forces of Sheng Shicai. The rebels were tacitly aided by the New 36th Division of the Chinese National Revolutionary Army.

== Start ==
Sheng Shicai had moved against Divisional General Mahmut Muhiti, the commander-in-chief of the 6th Uyghur Division and the deputy chief of the Kashgar Military Region. Muhiti resented the increased Soviet influence and formed a secret group around himself. Sheng feared that Muhiti had allied with Chinese General Ma Hu-shan, a Muslim. However, the Uyghurs of Kashgar heard hostile reports on Ma from Uyghur refugees from Khotan who suffered under him.

Muhiti fled Kashgar on April 2, 1937, with a small number of his subordinates and some amount of gold to British India via Yengi Hissar and Yarkand. Soon before his departure, he had sent a message to Ma Hu-Shan about his proposed arrival at Khotan. In response, Ma ordered his troops to prepare a parade and feast to honor Muhiti. That preparation pulled troops who guarded both mountain passes to Kashmir, which allowed Muhiti the opportunity to change his route and to sneak through into Kashmir. Muhiti's flight resulted in Uyghur troops rising in revolt in Yengi Hissar, Yarkand, and Artush, which resulted in the execution of all pro-Soviet officials and a number of Soviet advisers. An independent Turkic administration was set up by two of his officers, Kichik Akhund Sijiang, who commanded troops in Artush, and Abdul Niyaz Sijiang, who commanded troops in Yarkand and Yengi Hissar.

Liu Pin, a provincial commander in Kashgar Region with 700 troops at his command, responded to the rebellion by launching a squadron of nine Soviet planes to bomb Yangi Hissar and Yarkand. After Muhiti reached Srinagar in India, the following year, he went on pilgrimage to Mecca. A buildup of Soviet military assets occurred in Xinjiang before the outbreak of war. Around Kashgar, the Soviets sent AA guns, fighter planes, and soldiers of Russian and Kyrgyz origin in great numbers.

The start of the rebellion in southern Xinjiang had an immediate and tragic impact on the fate of about 400 Uyghur students, who had been sent by the Xinjiang government to the Soviet Union (1935–1937) to study in the university of Tashkent. They were all arrested on one night in May 1937 by the NKVD, the Soviet secret police, and executed without trial allegedly by orders of Joseph Stalin. Soviet diplomatic staff were also purged throughout the province in Soviet consulates in Urumchi, Karashar, Ghulja, Chuguchak, and Altai. Soviet Consul-General in Urumchi Garegin Apresov, the former Soviet consul in Mashhad, Iran, and the main architect of Soviet policies in Central Asia and the Middle East, was recalled to Moscow and shot by a firing squad for allegedly participating in the so-called "Fascist-Trotskyite Plot" against Stalin and attempting to overthrow Sheng Shicai's regime on April 12, 1937, a day that commemorated day of an uprising four years earlier. The rebellion is also viewed by some historians as a plot by Mahmut Muhiti and Ma Hu-shan to convert Xinjiang into a base for fighting against Stalinists.

A conquest of the Kremlin, Russian Turkistan, and Siberia was planned in an anti-Soviet movement formulated by Ma. He promised a devastation of Europe and the conquest of the Soviet Union and India. The anti-Soviet uprising by Ma was reported by United Press International (UPI) and read by Ahmad Kamal on 3 June 1937.

== New 36th Division invasion of Kashgar ==
Meanwhile, Ma Hushan and his Chinese Muslim troops of the New 36th Division (National Revolutionary Army) were watching the situation with interest since they were eager to seize more territory. Sheng Shicai surprisingly ordered the New 36th Division to quell the rebellion of the 6th Uyghur Division although the 33rd and 34th Regiments of the 6th Uyghur Division, which had been stationed in Kashgar since August 20, 1934, initially did not join the rebellion because they had previously trained in the Soviet Union. In 1934 to 1935, a number of officers of the 6th Uyghur Division were sent to Tashkent to study at its military academy. Soviet General Rybalko, General Obuhoff, and General Dotkin worked in Kashgar from 1934 to 1936, were the Soviet military advisers of Sheng Shicai's administration, and participated in organizing and training the staff of the 6th Uyghur Division.

Having received the order, the Tungans attacked Kashgar airfield on 20 May but were defeated. Ten days later, 1,500 Islamic irregulars under Kichik Akund attacked and seized Kashgar Old City. His troops wore armbands with the words "Fi sabil Allah" (Arabic: in the way of Allah). The rebellion was followed by a Kyrgyz uprising near Kucha and Muslim unrest in Hami.

Ma Hushan remained at Khotan watching the situation. His chief of staff, Pai Tzu-li, as well as Ma Ju-lung, the 1st Brigade commander at Karghalik, persuaded him to strike against Kashgar. Ma Ju-lung arrived on 2 June at Kashgar reportedly to "put down the rebels of Kichik Akhund" although Kichik Akhund had secretly agreed to back off and he transferred his soldiers and himself to Aksu. Kashgar was taken by Ma Hushan without a battle. The Fayzabad-Maral Bashi region was taken by Ma Sheng-kuei's 2nd Brigade. Ma Hu-shan strengthened his position in southern Xinjiang and avoided engaging in battle, which let the Turkic Muslim rebels do the fighting as a diversion for Sheng's provincial army.

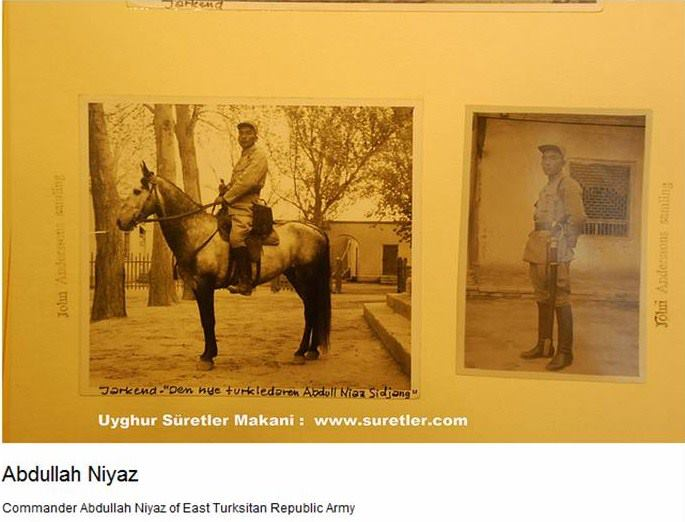
General Abdul Niyaz

Ma Hushan surrounded Kashgar New City and explained to the British Consulate-General that the Chinese Muslim forces, which were still officially the Kuomintang 36th Division, were acting in covenant with the Turkics (Uyghurs) to overthrow the pro-Soviet provincial government and to replace it with an Islamic government loyal to the Republic of China Kuomintang government at Nanjing.

Ma Hushan was paranoid about a Soviet attack and controlled the Kashgar-Khotan area because it offered him a safe escape to British India, where he could take a steamer from Calcutta safely back to Chinese seaports and then to Gansu and Qinghai. He and his officers repeatedly had vowed to attack the Soviets in conversations with Peter Fleming and sought to procure gas masks and airplanes to help them fight. Some sources claimed that Hushan's operation was supported by Britain.

In August 1937, 5,000 Soviet Red Army troops, backed by an air unit and an armored regiment, moved into Xinjiang at the request of Sheng Shicai, whose provincial troops were defeated by Muslim rebels in July 1937 at a battle near Karashar and could not continue their advance on the south. In late August, provincial forces, including White Russians, Red Army, and NKVD units, decisively defeated Kichik Akhund's troops at Aksu, with most of his troops being annihilated after they were machine-gunned and bombed in air attacks by a squadron of 24 Soviet airplanes in an open field near Aksu. As a result, Kichik Akhund and Abdul Niyaz escaped to Kashgar with only 200 men. After that battle, Ma Sheng-kuei was bribed by Sheng Shicai to defect and to turn against Ma Hushan. Ma Sheng-kuei marched on Kashgar on September 1, 1937, only to find that Ma Hushan, Ma Ju-lung, and Pai Tzu-li had withdrawn toward Karghalik with the 1st Brigade. On 7 September, Ma Hushan and his officers deserted their troops and fled to India with gold. Ma brought along with him 1000 ounces in gold, which was confiscated by the British.

Chinese General Ma Zhanshan, a Muslim, was allegedly one of the Soviet Army commanders during the invasion. It was reported that he had led Soviet troops disguised in Chinese uniforms along with bombers during the attack, which had been requested by Sheng Shicai.

General Chiang Yu-fen, a provincial commander, dispatched his men after Ma Hushan's 1st Brigade, and other provincial forces drove Abdu Niyaz and Kichik Akhund towards Yarkand. Red Army aircraft assisted the provincial forces by dropping bombs, including some containing mustard gas. These airplanes first flew from an airbase in Karakol, Soviet Union, and then from captured airfields in Uchturpan and Kucha. On 9 September, Yarkand fell to Sheng, and on 15 September, Abdul Niyaz was executed. On October 15 the Soviets bombed the city of Khotan, which resulted in 2,000 casualties. The remnants of the 36th division melted away through Kunlun Mountains in Qinghai and northern Tibet.

== Aftermath ==
Before the war, Ma Hushan had exchanged messages with the Nanjing government and expected it to send aid, as he said in conversations with Peter Fleming. However, in 1937, during the Soviet attack, China was invaded by Japan in the Second Sino-Japanese War. The pro-Soviet provincial forces of Sheng Shicai established their control over the whole of Xinjiang. All rivals were eliminated, and the defeat of the new 36th Division caused the control of the Chinese government in Xinjiang to cease.

Sheng Shicai set up a memorial to the Soviets killed in combat by Ma Hushan that included Russian Orthodox crosses.

The Chinese government was fully aware of the Soviet invasion of Xinjiang and of the Soviet troops moving around Xinjiang and Gansu, but it was forced to conceal them to the public as "Japanese propaganda" to avoid an international incident and to continue to receive military supplies from the Soviets.

In August 1937, a month into the full-scale war in China against the Japanese forces after the Marco Polo Bridge Incident, the Soviet Union sent the Republic of China material aid during the Second Sino-Japanese war against the Japanese invasion under the Sino-Soviet Non-Aggression Pact.

== See also ==
- Amur Military Flotilla
- Sino-Soviet conflict (1929)
- Kumul Rebellion
- Soviet Invasion of Xinjiang
- Ili Rebellion
