= Id Mirab =

Chinese-Kyrgyz politician

Id Mirab (Chinese: 埃德·米拉布; pinyin: Āidé·Mǐlābù) was a Kyrgyz leader who revolted against the Chinese Nationalist government in Xinjiang in 1932 during the Kirghiz rebellion. He was defeated.
