= 1911 Revolution in Xinjiang =

1911 Revolution in Xinjiang 辛亥革命在新疆
- Part of the 1911 Revolution
- Xinjiang in the Qing Dynasty
Date	28 November 1911-1912
Location	Xinjiang
Result	Revolutionary victory

Belligerents
Qing dynasty	Gelaohui Ili Revolutionary Party

Commanders and leaders
(Qing dynasty) Yuan Dahua (Qing dynasty) Zhirui † (Qing dynasty) Guangfu (Qing dynasty) Wang Peilan	Yang Zuanxu

Strength
Several thousand Provincial Chinese troops Manchu bannermen	Gelaohui rebels and Ili Revolutionaries, made out of Han Chinese, Hui Muslims, and Uyghurs

The 1911 Revolution spread from China proper to Xinjiang, where fighting occurred between Qing loyalists and the Anti-Qing Revolutionary Party (反清革命党人). Fighting took place mainly in Yili.

== Background ==
The Han Gelaohui had infiltrated the Qing military in Xinjiang during the Dungan Revolt (1895–1896) and allegedly planned to help the Hui rebels before the Hui rebels were crushed.

After the success of the Wuchang Uprising, responses came from all over China, in November 1911, twenty four provinces of the country broke away from the Qing government. Seeing this situation, the Royalist Party of Qing Dynasty conspired to welcome the Xuantong Emperor to move westward, in an attempt to build the capital in Kulun (now Ulaanbaatar of Mongolia) or Altay to cede the northwest, and continue to confront the revolutionary army. When the members of Revolutionary Party in Wuhan learned of this situation, they immediately told their members in Xinjiang, and the 1911 Revolution broke out in Xinjiang on November 28, 1911.

== Fighting ==
The last Gansu Xinjiang Provincial Governor (甘肃新疆巡抚) of Qing Yuan Dahua (袁大化) fled and handed over his resignation to Yang Zengxin on May 18, 1912, because of the resistance and struggle of the people of all ethnic groups in the north and south of the Tianshan Mountains, Yuan "cannot deal with the revolutionaries, hears the wind and loses gall" (穷于应付, 闻风丧胆), and finally had to "flee into the Shanhai Pass", on the other hand, he did not want to work for the Republic of China. The Ili revolutionaries and the Gelaohui were then suppressed by Yang. Yang appointed Ma Fuxing as military commander of 2,000 Chinese Muslim troops, to crush Yang's rivals. President Yuan Shikai recognized his rule, appointing him Provincial Governor of Xinjiang. The revolutionaries printed new multi-lingual media.

== Modern evaluation ==
Some Chinese historians believe that the success of the 1911 Revolution in Xinjiang (Yili) completely broke the Qing Emperor's plan of moving westward, and directly promoted the abdication of Xuantong Emperor, which has not yet received much attention in the field of Chinese historiography. The Revolution eradicated the last "life-saving straw" ("救命稻草") of the Qing Dynasty.

== See also ==
- Xinjiang under Qing rule
- History of the Republic of China
- Military of the Republic of China
- History of China
- Xinhai Lhasa Turmoil
- National Revolutionary Army
- Kuomintang
- Taishō period
- Russian Revolution
- German Revolution of 1918–19
