= Karakax County =

County in Xinjiang, China

Karakax County: قاراقاش ناھىيىسى (Uyghur); 墨玉县 (Chinese); Moyu, Mo-yü, Qaraqash
- County
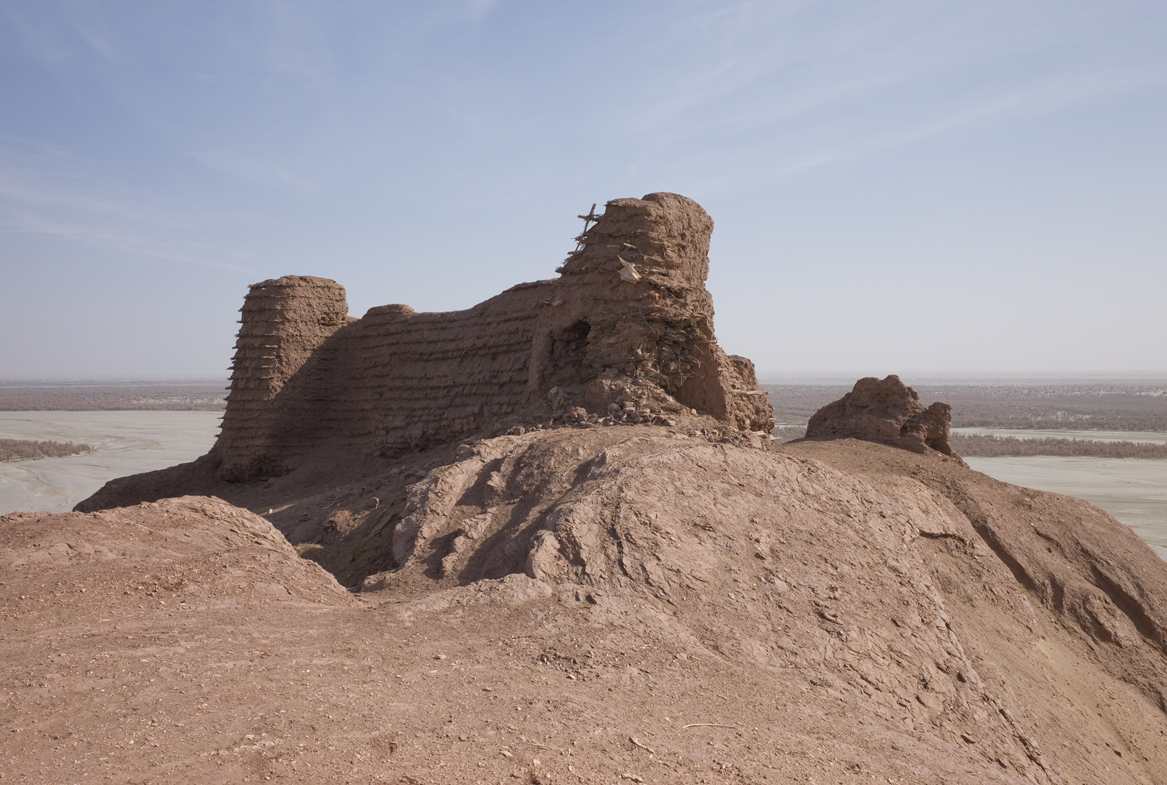
- Mazar Tagh

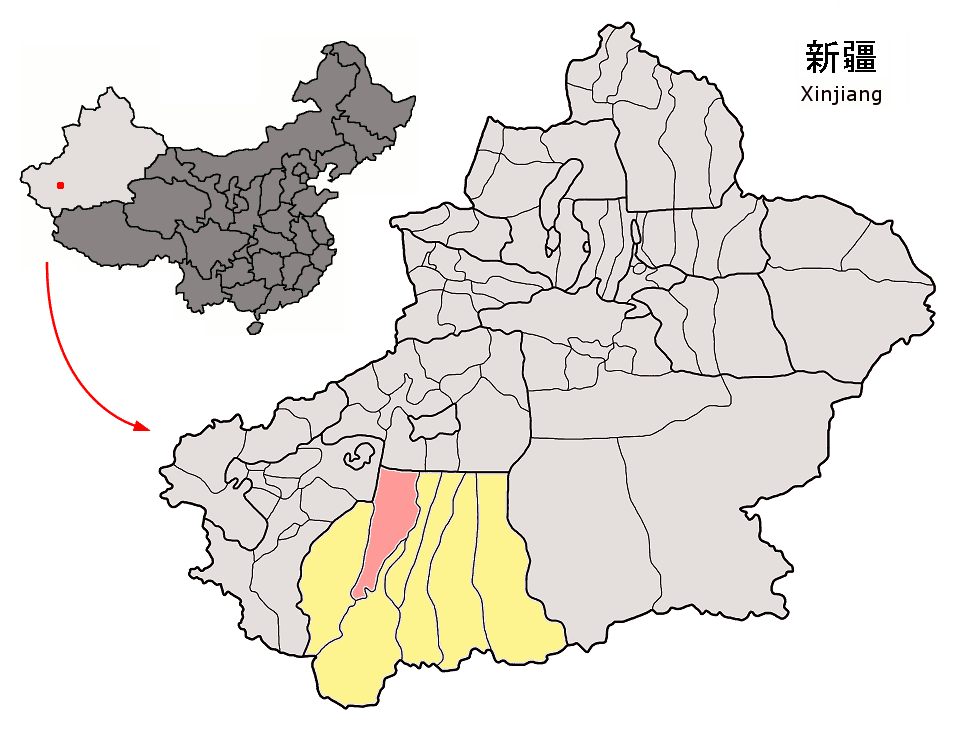
- Location of Karakax County (red) within Hotan Prefecture (yellow) and Xinjiang

- Location within Xinjiang Karakax County (Xinjiang) Karakax County (China)
- Coordinates: 37°17′N 79°42′E
- Country: China
- Autonomous region: Xinjiang
- Prefecture: Hotan
- County seat: Karakax Town

Area
  - Total: 25,788.86 km^{2} (9,957.13 sq mi)

Population (2020)
  - Total: 571,648
  - Density: 22.1665/km^{2} (57.4109/sq mi)

Ethnic groups
  - Major ethnic groups: Uyghur, Han Chinese
- Time zone: UTC+8 (China Standard (Note: Locals in Xinjiang frequently observe UTC+6 (Xinjiang Time), 2 hours behind Beijing.))
- Postal code: 848100
- Website: www.myx.gov.cn (in Chinese)

Karakax County

Uyghur name
- Uyghur: قاراقاش ناھىيىسى
Transcriptions
- Latin Yëziqi: Qaraqash Nahiyisi
- Yengi Yeziⱪ: Ⱪaraⱪax Naⱨiyisi
- SASM/GNC: Karakax Nahiyisi
- Siril Yëziqi: Қарақаш Наһийиси

Chinese name
- Simplified Chinese: 墨玉县
- Traditional Chinese: 墨玉縣
Transcriptions
Standard Mandarin
- Hanyu Pinyin: Mòyù Xiàn
- Wade–Giles: Mo⁴-yü⁴ Hsien⁴

Alternative Chinese name
- Simplified Chinese: 喀拉喀什县
- Traditional Chinese: 喀拉喀什縣
Transcriptions
Standard Mandarin
- Hanyu Pinyin: Kālākāshí Xiàn

Karakax County (Uyghur: قاراقاش ناھىيىسى, also transliterated as Qaraqash; Chinese: 喀拉喀什县), also known as Moyu County (Chinese: 墨玉县), is a county in the Xinjiang Uyghur Autonomous Region and is located in the southern edge of the Tarim Basin, it is under the administration of the Hotan Prefecture. It contains an area of 25,667 km^{2} (9,910 sq mi). According to the 2011 census it has a population of 577,000 and 98.1% are Uyghurs. The county is bordered to the north by Awat County in Aksu Prefecture, to the northeast by Lop County, to the southeast by Hotan County, to the northwest by Maralbexi County in Kashgar Prefecture, and to the southwest by Pishan County and Kunyu. Exclaves of Kunyu are located within the county.

== History ==
In the Late Qing dynasty, the area that would become Karakax County was divided into four ming (明) (Mandarin Chinese Hanyu Pinyin-derived names): Hayashi (哈雅什明), Buhua (布華明), Makuiya (馬奎牙明), and Kuiya (奎牙明). On the eve of the creation of the county, the area was divided into six ming (明): Zhawa (扎瓦明), Ying'ai (英愛明) (also known as Tahe (塔合明)), Balamusu (巴拉木蘇明), Kuiya (奎牙明), Makuiya (馬奎牙明), and Ka'ersai (喀爾賽明).

In 1919, the county was split off from Hotan County.

In October 1984, the people's communes in the county were replaced with towns and townships.

In 2012, Zawa (Zhawa) was changed from a township into a town.

In 2013, Kuya (Kuiya) was changed from a township into a town.

On February 13, 2014, Qarasaz (Ka'ersai) was changed from a township into a town.

On the morning of June 20, 2014, five police officers at a security checkpoint in Kayash village in Manglay township were found dead killed by unknown assailants. The security checkpoint, known as a place where women wearing headscarves and men wearing beards would be interrogated, was razed to the ground.

At 3 AM on July 19, 2014, the day after a raid at a local mosque, Zeynep Memtimin, wife of party secretary Rejep Islam, was killed by unknown assailants in an attack at their home. Islam was severely injured and left for dead, but survived.

In December 2016, the Communist Party office in Karakax County was reportedly attacked by assailants using knives and improvised explosive devices, leading to the deaths of two government employees and three assailants.

In 2017, the county was divided between four and later five main district area committees (大片区管委会).

In May 2017, Abduheber Ahmet, the imam of the Dongbagh Mosque in Urchi township, was arrested for bringing his son to an underground religious school on one occasion several years before the arrest. Because Ahmet admitted that the events took place, Ahmet was sentenced to five and a half years in prison instead of seven years.

In February 2020 dissidents leaked the hacked records of 311 detained Uyghurs from a single neighborhood in Karakax County.

== Geography ==
The populated part of Karakax county is located at the northern edge of the Karakoram mountains and southern part of Tarim Basin (Taklamakan Desert). The Karakax river separates the county from Hotan County and the Hotan River separates the county from Lop County. The length from south to north is 320 km (200 mi) and width from east to width is 51 km (32 mi). Mazartag is a prominent arc-shaped mountain range in the northern desert area of the county.

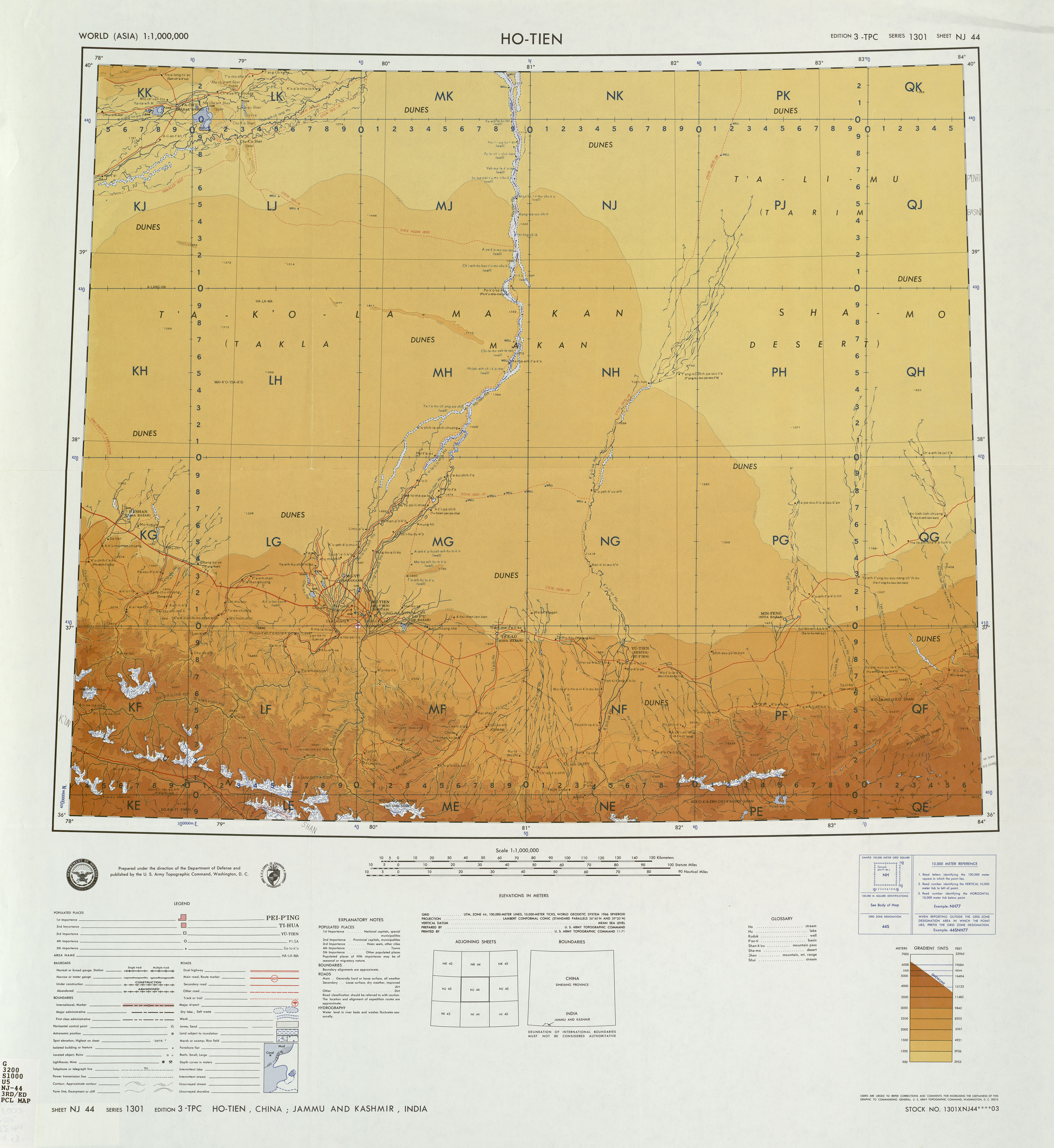
Map including Karakax (labeled as MO-YÜ (KARAKASH)) and surrounding region (USATC, 1971) (Note: From map: "DELINEATION OF INTERNATIONAL BOUNDARIES MUST NOT BE CONSIDERED AUTHORITATIVE".)

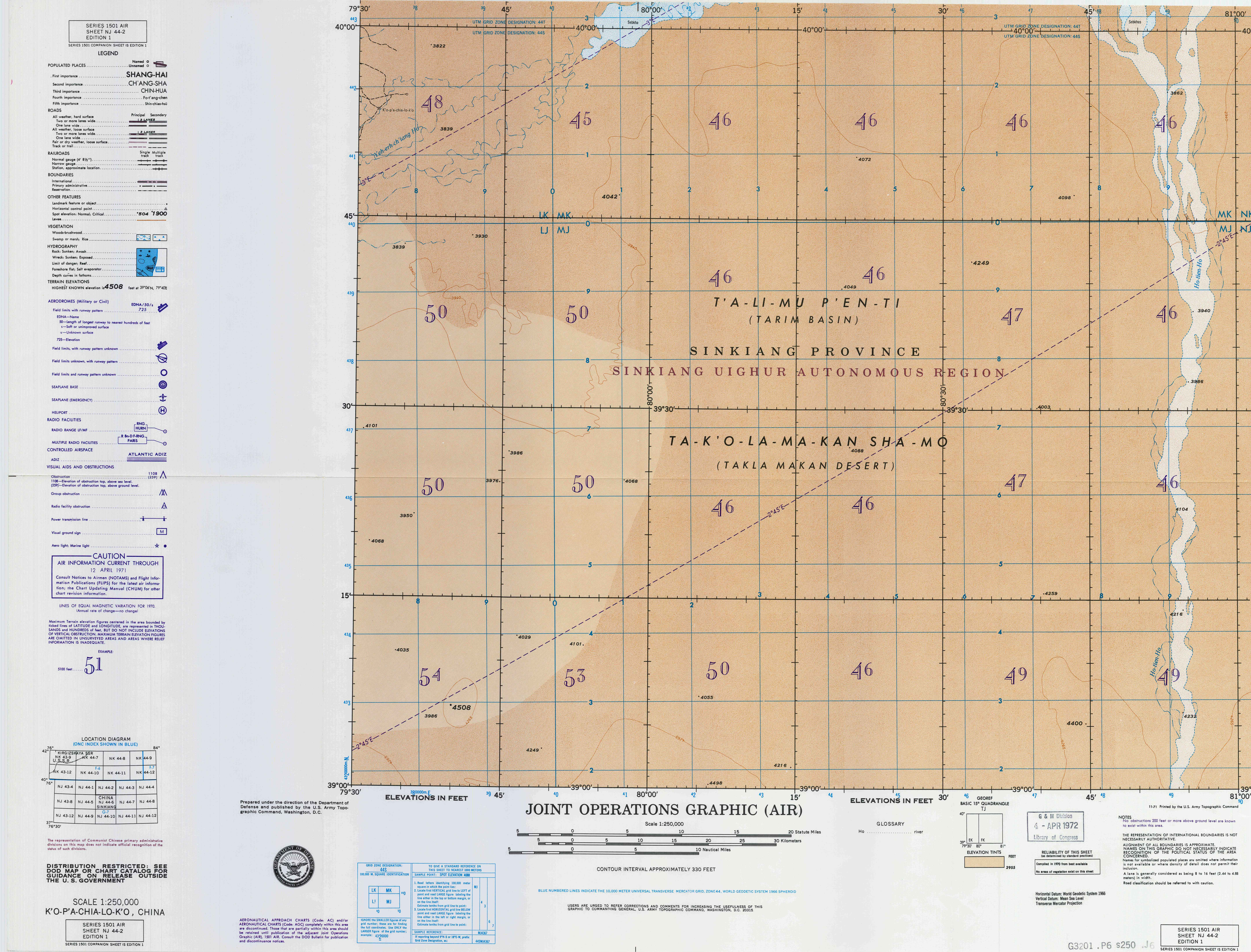
Map including part of northern Karakax (Moyu) County (ATC, 1971)

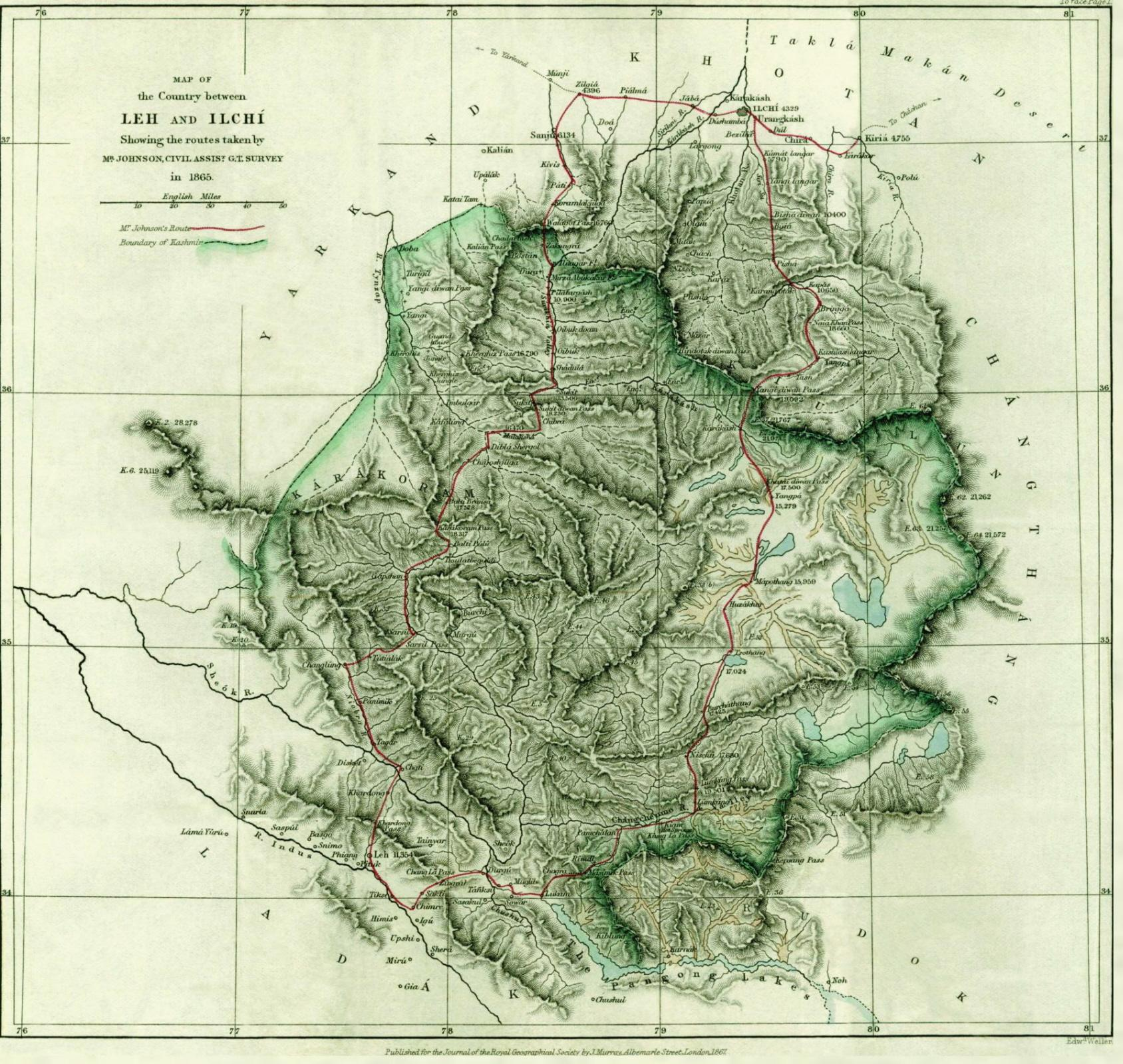
Map including Kárakásh (1865)

== Climate ==
Climate data for Karakax, elevation 1,349 m (4,426 ft), (1991–2020 normals, extremes 1981–present)
Month	Jan	Feb	Mar	Apr	May	Jun	Jul	Aug	Sep	Oct	Nov	Dec	Year
Record high °C (°F)	21.0 (69.8)	23.6 (74.5)	31.0 (87.8)	35.5 (95.9)	37.5 (99.5)	39.9 (103.8)	40.7 (105.3)	39.2 (102.6)	35.3 (95.5)	29.9 (85.8)	26.0 (78.8)	18.8 (65.8)	40.7 (105.3)
Mean daily maximum °C (°F)	1.4 (34.5)	7.5 (45.5)	17.0 (62.6)	24.4 (75.9)	28.2 (82.8)	31.3 (88.3)	32.6 (90.7)	31.4 (88.5)	27.6 (81.7)	21.4 (70.5)	12.3 (54.1)	3.4 (38.1)	19.9 (67.8)
Daily mean °C (°F)	−5.2 (22.6)	0.6 (33.1)	9.3 (48.7)	16.2 (61.2)	20.1 (68.2)	23.3 (73.9)	24.6 (76.3)	23.4 (74.1)	18.7 (65.7)	11.1 (52.0)	3.4 (38.1)	−3.2 (26.2)	11.9 (53.3)
Mean daily minimum °C (°F)	−11.0 (12.2)	−5.7 (21.7)	1.9 (35.4)	8.5 (47.3)	12.7 (54.9)	16.3 (61.3)	18.1 (64.6)	17.0 (62.6)	11.5 (52.7)	2.9 (37.2)	−3.6 (25.5)	−8.6 (16.5)	5.0 (41.0)
Record low °C (°F)	−22.5 (−8.5)	−22.3 (−8.1)	−8.8 (16.2)	−0.5 (31.1)	2.9 (37.2)	8.3 (46.9)	10.5 (50.9)	7.9 (46.2)	2.4 (36.3)	−5.9 (21.4)	−13.5 (7.7)	−21.7 (−7.1)	−22.5 (−8.5)
Average precipitation mm (inches)	1.7 (0.07)	2.3 (0.09)	2.8 (0.11)	3.4 (0.13)	8.7 (0.34)	10.8 (0.43)	8.7 (0.34)	6.4 (0.25)	5.3 (0.21)	1.3 (0.05)	1.4 (0.06)	1.1 (0.04)	53.9 (2.12)
Average precipitation days (≥ 0.1 mm)	1.9	1.3	0.8	1.2	2.8	3.7	3.5	2.7	1.4	0.4	0.5	1.3	21.5
Average snowy days	4.7	2.4	0.4	0	0	0	0	0	0	0	0.5	3.4	11.4
Average relative humidity (%)	60	50	38	38	47	51	57	61	63	60	55	62	54
Mean monthly sunshine hours	166.8	170.9	201.9	220.6	254.9	263.4	250.2	229.3	231.9	243.3	208.5	174.7	2,616.4
Percentage possible sunshine	54	55	54	55	58	60	57	56	64	71	69	59	59
Source: China Meteorological Administrationall-time February high

== Administrative divisions ==
Karakax county is subdivided into the following 5 towns and 11 townships:

Name	Simplified Chinese	Hanyu Pinyin	Uyghur (UEY)	Uyghur Latin (ULY)	Administrative division code	Notes
Towns
Karakax Town	喀拉喀什镇	Kālākāshí Zhèn	قاراقاش بازىرى	qaraqash baziri	653222100	
Zawa Town (Cha-wa)	扎瓦镇	Zhāwǎ Zhèn	زاۋا بازىرى	zawa baziri	653222101	
Kuya Town	奎牙镇	Kuíyá Zhèn	كۇيا بازىرى	kuya baziri	653222102	
Qarasay Town	喀尔赛镇	Kā'ěrsài Zhèn	قاراساي بازىرى	qarasay baziri	653222103	
Purchaqchi Town	普恰克其镇	Pǔqiàkèqí Zhèn	پۇرچاقچى بازىرى	purchaqchi baziri	653222104	formerly Purchaqchi Township (پۇرچاقچى يېزىسى / 普恰克其乡)
Townships
Aqsaray Township	阿克萨拉依乡	Ākèsàlāyī Xiāng	ئاقساراي يېزىسى	Aqsaray yëzisi	653222203	
Urchi Township	乌尔其乡	Wū'ěrqí Xiāng	ئۇرچى يېزىسى	Urchi yëzisi	653222204	
Tokhula Township	托胡拉乡	Tuōhúlā Xiāng	توخۇلا يېزىسى	toxula yëzisi	653222205	
Saybagh Township	萨依巴格乡	Sàyībāgé Xiāng	سايباغ يېزىسى	saybagh yëzisi	653222206	
Jahanbagh Township	加汗巴格乡	Jiāhànbāgé Xiāng	جاھانباغ يېزىسى	jahanbagh yëzisi	653222207	
Manglay Township	芒来乡	Mánglái Xiāng	ماڭلاي يېزىسى	manglay yëzisi	653222209	
Qochi Township	阔依其乡	Kuòyīqí Xiāng	قوچى يېزىسى	qochi yëzisi	653222210	
Yawa Township (Ya-wa)	雅瓦乡	Yǎwǎ Xiāng	ياۋا يېزىسى	yawa yëzisi	653222211	
Tüwat Township	吐外特乡	Tǔwàitè Xiāng	تۈۋەت يېزىسى	tüwet yëzisi	653222212	
Yéngiyer Township	英也尔乡	Yīngyě'ěr Xiāng	يېڭىيەر يېزىسى	yëngiyer yëzisi	653222213	
Kawak Township	喀瓦克乡	Kāwǎkè Xiāng	كاۋاك يېزىسى	kawak yëzisi	653222214	

== Economy ==
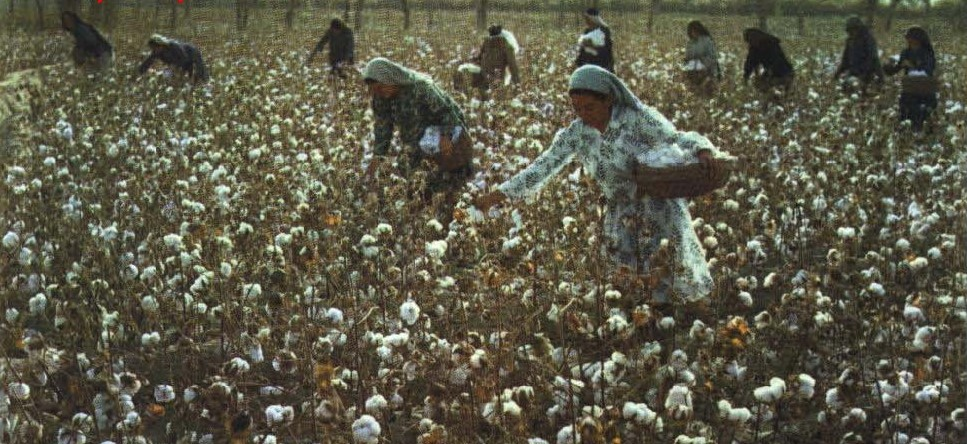
Cotton farmers in Karakax County, 31 March 1965

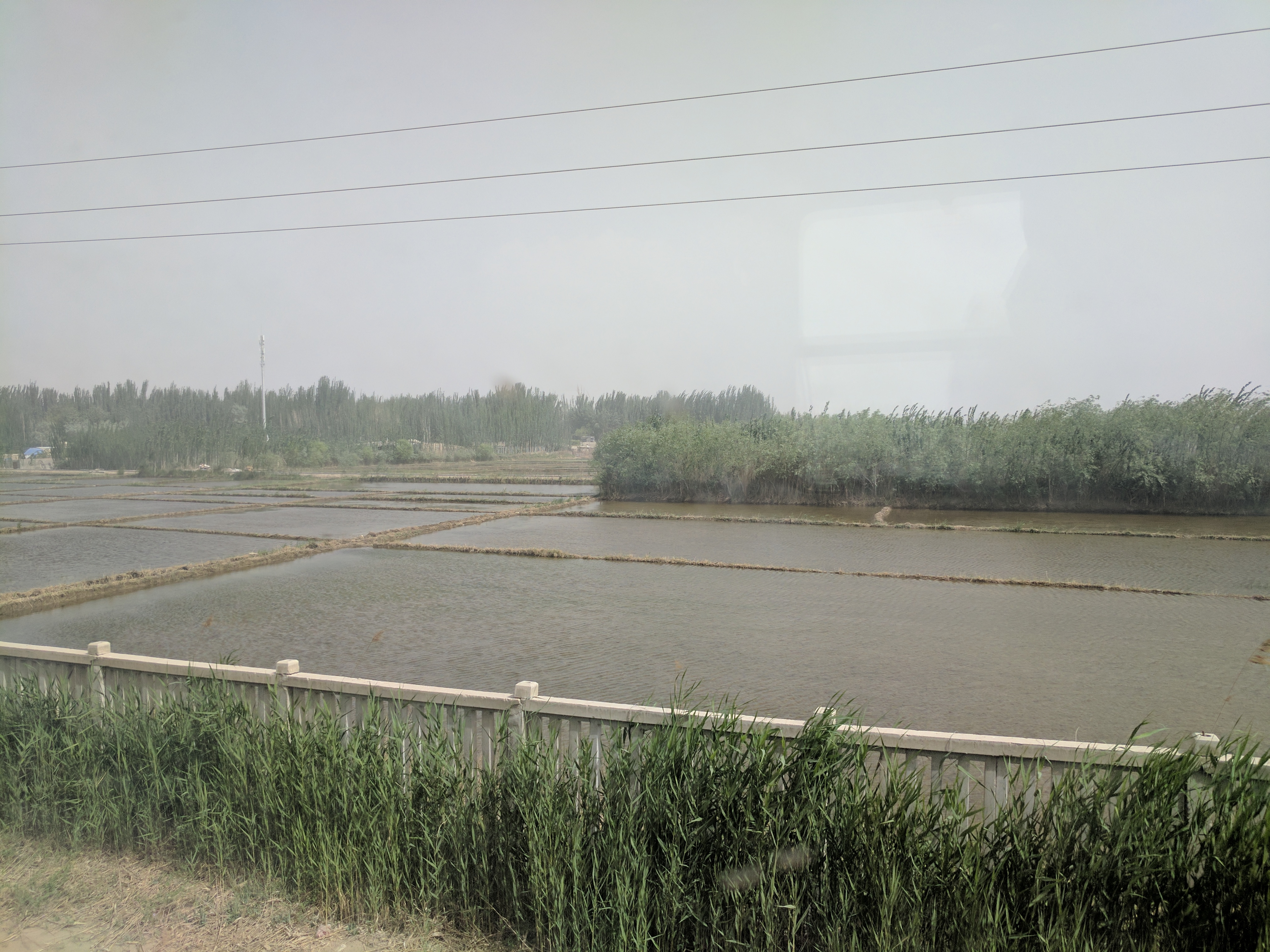
A rice paddy field in Karakax County

The county produces cotton, corn, wheat, melons, silkworm cocoons, black jade and walnuts. Industries include cotton ginning, food processing, tractors and carpet making.

== Demographics ==
Historical population
Year	Pop.	±% p.a.
2000	405,634	—
2010	500,114	+2.12%

As of 2015, Uyghurs made up 97.61% of the population of the county. Han Chinese made up 2.34% of the population.

As of 1999, 98.53% of the population of Karakax (Moyu) County was Uyghur and 1.44% of the population was Han Chinese.

== Transportation ==
Karakax county has daily bus and taxi to Hotan and other counties like Guma, and also has direct luxury buses to Ürümchi, which is the capital city of Xinjiang, Karakax is also served by China National Highway 315 and the Kashgar-Hotan Railway.

A long, straight special-use road (专用道) enters the Taklamakan Desert northwest of Dunkule village (墩库勒村) in Kawak (Kawake) township. The road turns near a ridge and terminates near buildings. The area is near Mazar Tagh (Ma-cha-t'a-ko, Mazartag; مازار تاغ / 麻扎塔格戌堡遗址).

== See also ==
- Melikawat
