= Ma Hushan =

Chinese warlord

- 馬虎山
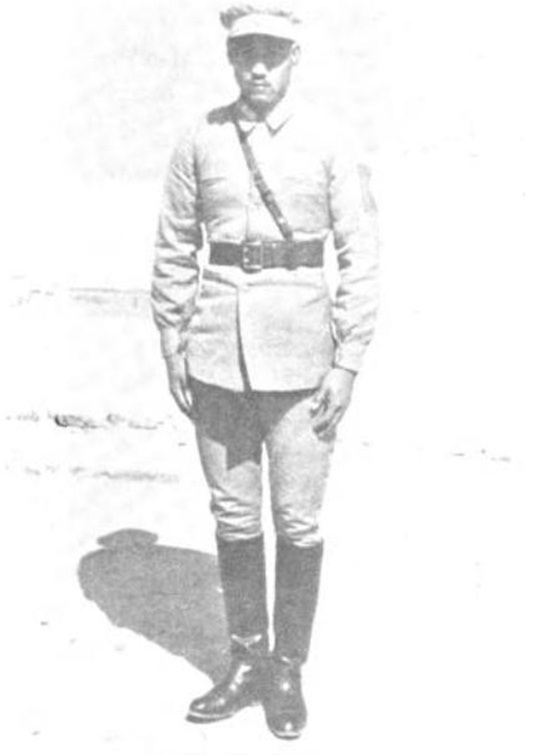
- Hushan in 1937
- Born: 1910; Gansu, Qing China
- Died: 1954 (aged 43–44); Lanzhou, Gansu, People's Republic of China
- Military career
- Allegiance: Republic of China
- Service years: 1929–54
- Rank: General
- Unit: New 36th Division
- Commands: Deputy Divisional Commander of the New 36th Division then promoted to Chief of the New 36th Division
- Conflicts: Soviet Invasion of Xinjiang; Charkhlik Revolt; Xinjiang War (1937); Kuomintang Islamic Insurgency in China (1950–1958)

Ma Hushan (Xiao'erjing: ﻣَﺎ ﺧُﻮْ شً, traditional Chinese: 馬虎山; simplified Chinese: 马虎山; pinyin: Mǎ Hǔshān; 1910 – 1954) was a Chinese Muslim warlord and the brother-in-law and follower of Ma Zhongying, a Dungan/Hui Ma Clique warlord. He ruled over an area of Southern Xinjiang, called Tunganistan by Westerners (as the Hui were then known as 'Tunganis'), from 1934 to 1937. Locals sometimes referred to him as padishah (lit. 'king').

== Tunganistan ==
Ma Hushan fought against the Russian Red Army and White Russian forces during the Soviet Invasion of Xinjiang and defeated them in battle. “The Russ brought the fiji (airplane) and bombed and gassed us“ he said about the war.

He also took part in the war to destroy the First East Turkestan Republic, commanding the new 36th division at the Battle of Kashgar and Battle of Khotan.

Ma's 36th Division crushed the Charkhlik Revolt by the Uighurs in the Charkhlik oasis. It controlled southern Xinjiang's oasis and the area was nicknamed "Tunganistan" by Peter Fleming. Ma Hushan and the new 36th Division declared their loyalty to the Kuomintang government in Nanjing and sent emissaries there requesting aid to fight against Sheng Shicai's provincial forces and the Soviet Union.

Khotan was the base of Ma Hushan during his rule over the southern oases. His troops were said to be "strongly anti-Japanese", and the territory they ruled was covered with "most of the stock anti-Japanese slogans from China proper," and Ma made "Resistance to Japanese Imperialism" part of his governing doctrine. Ma Hushan himself was described by Ella Maillart as a "well-set-up long-legged man".

=== Carpet Factory ===
Ma's regime forced the switch from the old, internationally renowned style to the manufacture of Chinese-style carpets, of which were of poorer quality and made from more unstable dyes, by the government-owned factory. He ordered the creation of "small blue carpets", "woven in Khotan". They were of Chinese design, with Chinese writing on them. Peter Birchler mistakenly said that Ma Hushan's brother-in-law Ma Zhongying was the client of the carpet factory.

=== Xinjiang War (1937) ===
Ma Hushan formulated a plan for an anti-Soviet "jihad" to conquer the Kremlin, Russian Turkestan and Siberia. He promised a devastated Europe and the conquering of Russia and India. The anti-Soviet client uprising by Ma Hsi Jung (Ma Ho San) was reported by United Press International (UPI) 3 June 1937.

Ma's troops were defeated by Sheng Shicai and the Soviets, and many of them deserted or defected. Ma fled to British India. He brought with him thousands of ounces of gold, which was confiscated by the British. The British kept that money to pay for the alleged "looting" of British property in Kashgar by Ma's troops, but eventually sent the money "back" to Sheng Shicai's regime. He was briefly detained by the British, then took a steamer from Calcutta back to China—specifically Qinghai province—in 1938.

British telegrams from India in 1937 said that Tungans like Ma Zhongying and Ma Hushan had reached an agreement with the Soviets, whom they had previously fought, that since the Japanese had begun full-scale warfare with China, that Tungans led by Ma Hushan would help Chinese forces battle Japan, and that he would return to Gansu.

Sven Hedin reported that a telegram from the diplomatic office in India stated Ma Hushan would "certainly obey the summons" to join the Chinese side in the war against Japan.

== Kuomintang insurgency in Southwestern China ==
Ma led the Kuomintang anti-communist insurgency in Southwestern China from 1950 to 1954 against the PLA using guerrilla tactics. He was captured in 1954 and executed at Lanzhou.
