= Khoja Niyaz =

President of the First East Turkestan Republic

Khoja Niyaz خوجا نىياز
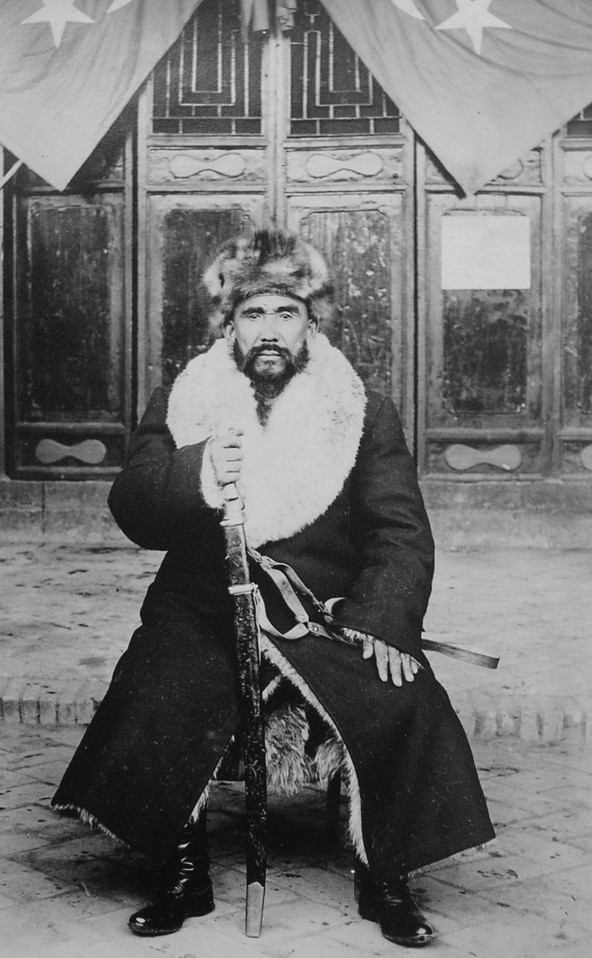
- Khoja Niyaz in front of Kökbayraq

President of Turkestan the Islamic Republic of East Turkestan
- In office November 12, 1933 – April 16, 1934
- Preceded by: Polity established
- Succeeded by: Polity abolished

Personal details
- Born: 1889 Kumul, Xinjiang, Qing China
- Died: August 21, 1941 (aged 51–52) Urumchi, Xinjiang, Republic of China

Khoja Niyaz, also Khoja Niyaz Haji (Uyghur: خوجا نىياز ھاجى, romanized: Xoja Niyaz Haji; Chinese: 和加尼牙孜; pinyin: Héjiā Níyázī; 1889 – 21 August 1941), was a Uyghur independence movement leader who led several rebellions in Xinjiang against the Kumul Khanate, the Chinese governor Jin Shuren and later the Hui warlord Ma Zhongying. He is best remembered as the first and only president of the short-lived Islamic Republic of Eastern Turkestan from November 1933 until the republic's defeat in April 1934.

== Early life and uprisings ==
Khoja was born in 1889 in a small mountainous village in Kumul Prefecture, Xinjiang. He participated in his first rebellion at the age 18, joining a 1907 uprising of peasants and mountaineers against Shah Maqsud, hereditary ruler of Kumul (who was allowed semi-autonomous rule by Qing China). After being defeated, he fled to the Turpan region, where he entered "Astana," religious school and became acquainted with future prominent Uyghur Turpan revolutionary leaders, brothers Maksut and Mahmut Muhiti. After one year of studying, he left Turpan and went on the Hajj to Mecca, adding to his name the title "Hajji".

In 1912, Khoja returned to Xinjiang where another uprising against the Kumul Khanate, led by Temur Halpa, was developing and he joined the rebellion, quickly being promoted to the position of an adviser to the leader of uprising. Following the treacherous killing of Temur Halpa at the banquet on September 6, 1913, held by Xinjiang Governor Yang Zengxin, who previously had mediated the conflict and raised Temur Halpa to the position of Commander of Provincial Troops in the Kumul Region, Hoja Niyaz was forced again to flee.

In 1916, he came to the then-Russian boundary town of Jarkent, Semiryechye Oblast, founded and populated by Ili Uyghurs who had escaped to Russia after 1881, when Qing troops re-took the Ili valley of Xinjiang. In Jarkent, he served under local Uyghur leader and wealthy merchant Valiahun Yuldashev and, after the Russian Revolution erupted in 1917, helped to organize small, local Uyghur self-defense groups. After the Russian Civil War came to Semiryechye, Hoja Niyaz met Uyghur revolutionary Abdulla Rozibakiev, one of the founders of the Inqlawi Uyghur Ittipaqi ("Revolutionary Uyghur Union") in 1921, a revolutionary nationalistic organization under umbrella of the Comintern.

== Revolutionary leader ==
In 1923, Khoja Niyaz returned to Xinjiang, first to Ghulja, then to Urumchi, where he was involved in organizing underground revolutionary groups and preparing a new rebellion. In 1927, he returned to Kumul for the funeral of his father, and after the death of Kumul Khanate ruler Shah Mahsut in March 1930, Hoja Niyaz was appointed to the high position of adviser to new ruler of the Kumul Khanate.

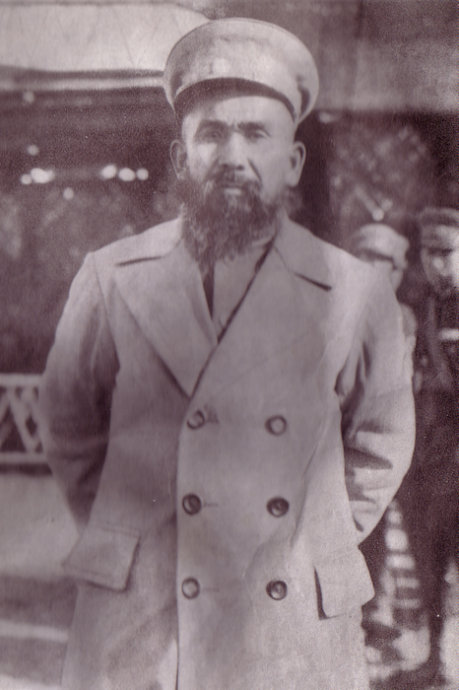
Khoja Niyaz, location not clear

Nevertheless, the Xinjiang Governor Jin Shuren (1928–1933), sought to take advantage of the power vacuum left after the death of Shah Mahsut and decreed the abolition of the Kumul Khanate, preventing the new ruler, Shah Mahsut's son Nazir, from assuming control. At the same time, Jin Shuren arranged for Han Chinese migrants from Gansu to settle in the abolished Khanate. These events sparked the Kumul Rebellion in 1931, which was led by Hui warlord Ma Zhongying in Gansu after his June 1931 meeting with Hoja Niyaz and Yulbars Khan. Ma Zhongying agreed to add his troops to the campaign to topple Jin Shuren. Hoja Niyaz also received support from the Mongolian People's Republic: in autumn 1931 they provided him 600 sets of winter clothes, felt tents and 120 rifles (which were actually bartered for horses, one rifle was given for two horses).

Rebellion soon spread from the East of Xinjiang throughout the whole province and by February, 1933, when Urumqi was laid siege by joint Uyghur and Hui troops, the Provincial Government controlled no more than 10% of Xinjiang's territory. On April 12, 1933, General Sheng Shicai came to power in Xinjiang after former Governor Jin Shuren was toppled off in March by the mutinied Russian Cossack troops (retreated to Northern Xinjiang in 1921 after losing civil war in Russia), who previously were mobilized by Jin Shuren into Provincial Army in late 1931 in desperate attempt to quell Rebellion. Sheng Shicai gained support from USSR after confirming all secret agreements that previous Governor concluded with the Soviet Union and in June 1933 he made an alliance with Hoja Niyaz against Ma Zhongying. Previous alliance between Hoja Niyaz and Ma Zhongying was destroyed following the battle of Jimsar. On this battle Hoja-Niyaz forces suffered heavy casualties, but forced garrison of Jimsar to surrender. Ma Zhongying's forces during the battle guarded mostly the flanks and the back of joint troops, while Uyghur troops were put into the frontal attack on Jimsar fortress. Hoja-Niyaz agreed to provide the free retreat of besieged garrison in exchange of weapons of the fortress' Arsenal. But at night, Ma Zhongying suddenly came to the fortress, seized all Arsenal (12,000 rifles, 6 machine guns and 500,000 bullets) and joined Chinese garrison to his Tungan troops. He refused to share weapons of the seized Arsenal with Hoja-Niyaz, that outraged the latter. This happened on May 28, 1933 and on the next few days Hoja-Niyaz already met with the representatives of Soviet Consul-General in Urumchi Apressoff to start peaceful talks with Sheng Shicai. Agreement of alliance between Sheng Shicai and Hoja-Niyaz was signed on June 4, 1933 and at this time the Soviets gave Hoja Niyaz "nearly 2,000 rifles with ammunition, a few hundred bombs and three machine guns." The newly appointed Soviet Consul in Urumqi, Garegin Apresoff, who arranged negotiations, forced Hoja Niyaz to turn his troops against Tungans (Hui) forces, and that eventually led to the rebellion's turning into massacres between different national groups, and its defeat in the hands of Provincial troops.

Hoja Niyaz marched his troops across Dawan Ch'eng to Toksun, where he was defeated at the Battle of Toksun by Tungans under General Ma Shih-ming. Hoja Niyaz then fell back to Kashgar on January 13, 1934, retreating from Aksu through a 300 miles-long march by Tengri Tagh mountain road along the Soviet/Chinese border, bypassing this way general Ma Fuyuan's Tungan forces who waited him on the main road from Aksu to Kashgar, and assumed the Presidency of the self-proclaimed Turkic Islamic Republic of East Turkestan. Joining the break-away republic went against his deal of June 4, 1933 with Sheng Shicai (the so-called Jimsar Agreement in 7 articles, in this Agreement Hoja-Niyaz dropped his claims to Northern Xinjiang or Jungaria in exchange of recognizing his rights for the whole territory south of Tengri Tagh, including Kashgaria, Turpan Depression and Kumul Depression, in this Agreement all this vast territory was granted "Autonomy" and Chinese promised not to cross Tengri Tagh, that divides Xinjiang onto two parts). However, offensive of Tungan forces, direct Soviet military intervention into Xinjiang and Soviet ultimate support of Sheng Shicai led to the defeat of East Turkestan Republic by June 1934.

== Death ==
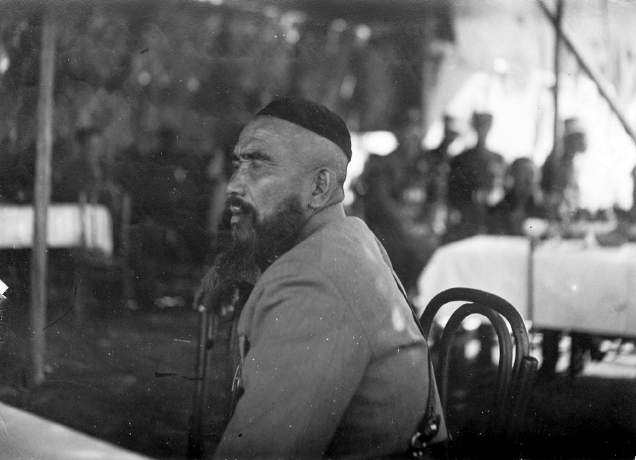
Hoja-Niyaz at the Second Congress of People's Representatives, Ürümchi, April 1935

There are contradictory statements about his death. Though appointed by Sheng Shicai as the Vice-Chairman of the Xinjiang Government and "Civil Governor for life" of the Xinjiang province in 1934, Khoja Niyaz actually was separated from his troops and held in Urumchi as a puppet under close supervising of Soviet agents. He was denied his request to meet Stalin in person and to settle the Xinjiang issue in accordance with the Right of nations to self-determination, which was officially supported by the USSR in its revolutionary doctrine. In November 1937, following the Rebellion of the 6th Uyghur Division under general Mahmut Muhiti against the Provincial Xinjiang Government at Kashgar, Artush, Yarkand, Aksu, Kucha and Karashar in April–October 1937 in Southern Xinjiang, Khoja Niyaz was arrested in Urumchi and allegedly executed in 1938. The death penalty was approved by Moscow, Khoja Niyaz and his 120 followers were labeled as counter-revolutionary "Trotskysts" and "Japanese agents." Khoja Niyaz rejected all accusations against him saying that they were all fabricated by Sheng Shicai. Being sentencing to the death penalty, Khoja Niyaz said in his last words: This death sentence is not new for me. Actually, I have died in a day when I came to Urumchi (he meant his departure from Aksu in August 1934 after negotiations with Soviet Consul-General in Urumchi Garegin Apresov, who urged him to come to Urumchi and accept the offer from Sheng Shicai to become a Vice-Chairman of Xinjiang Government, Commander of 6th Uyghur Division Mahmut Muhiti was against this move, considering that it will affect badly Uyghur cause for independence), I will die, but my People will continue to live...Revolution will not be terminated. He reportedly told a visitor (Ziyauddin) that "I trusted Apresoff and relied on his guarantee, now look what Sheng Shih-ts'ai has done to me. I'm his prisoner. Go tell Apresoff of my predicament", but Apresov was nowhere to be found. Other versions speculate he was held alive in prison as far as summer 1943, when he was executed on the orders of Chiang Kai-shek, who restored Kuomintang control over Xinjiang in 1943 following Sheng Shicai expelling Soviet military personnel and advisers from the province. It is reported that he was strangled to death in his cell after spending 14 months in jail.

The name Niyas was used for a son of Yulbars Khan.

== See also ==
- Islamic Republic of East Turkestan
- Sabit Damolla

== Sources ==
- Pahta, Ghulamuddin (1990). "Soviet-Chinese collaboration in Eastern Turkestan: the case of the 1933 uprising". Institute of Muslim Minority Affairs. 11 (2): 250. doi:10.1080/02666959008716168.
