= Emblem of East Turkestan =

Emblem of East Turkestan شەرقىي تۈركىستان دۆلەت گېربى
- Armiger: Islamic Republic of East Turkestan
- Adopted: 12 November 1933
- Crest: Three mullets azure
- Shield: Basmala and crescent moon azure
- Supporters: Lunar phase azure

The Emblem of East Turkestan (Uyghur: شەرقىي تۈركىستان دۆلەت گېربى) was adopted on 12 November 1933, when the Islamic Republic of East Turkestan declared independence. After the fall of the country, it became a symbol of the East Turkestan independence movement and appears on the official emblem of the East Turkistan Government in Exile.

== Description ==
All of the elements featured in the emblem are in azure, which is the tincture of blue in heraldry.

=== Basmala ===
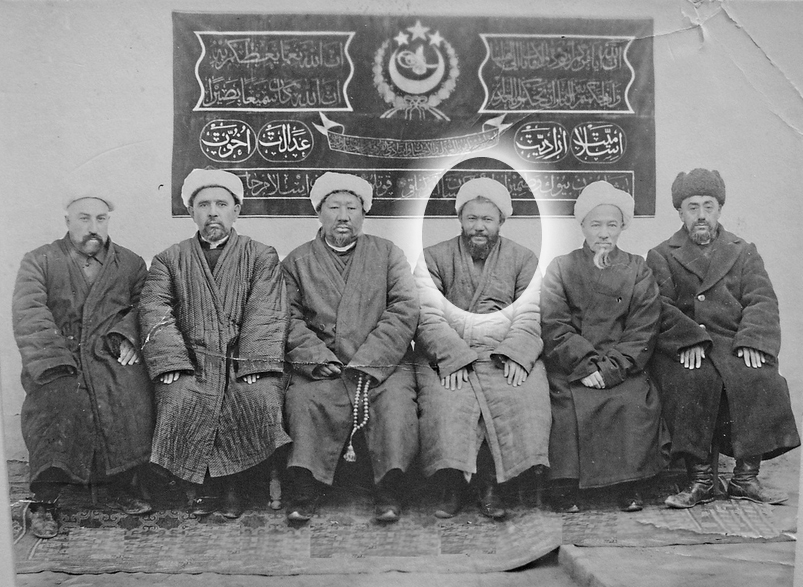
Prime minister Sabit Damolla and ministers of the Islamic Republic of East Turkestan in front of a board which included the emblem in the center

The basmala in the middle is stylised as a tughra.

=== Crescent ===
There is a crescent moon under the Basmala.

=== Three Stars ===
There is three stars on top of the emblem which represent three independent states which existed in or throughout the East Turkestan territory.

- Turkic Khaganate
- Uyghur Khaganate
- Kara-Khanid Khanate

=== Circles ===
There are 18 circles with different sizes which represent 18 local tribes who lived in the territory, which also represent the moon cycle.

- Pechinek
- Qipchaq
- Oghuz
- Basmil
- Qay
- Yabaqu
- Tatar
- Kyrgyz
- Chigil
- Toqsi
- Yaghma
- Oghraq
- Charuq
- Chumul
- Uyghur
- Tangghut
- Qitan
- Qarluq

== See also ==
- First East Turkestan Republic
- Flag of East Turkestan
