= Kök Bayraq =

Kök Bayraq means "blue flag" or "blue banner" in Crimean Tatar and Uyghur. It may refer to:

- The flag of the Crimean People's Republic (1917–1918), now widely used to represent Crimean Tatars in general
- The flag of the First East Turkestan Republic (1933–1934), now widely used to represent East Turkestan or Uyghurs in general
