= Nurmemet Yasin =

Uyghur author (c. 1977 – c. 2011)

- Born: c. 1977
- Died: 2011 (reported 2013); Shaya Prison, Xinjiang, China
- Occupation: Author
- Known for: 2005 imprisonment

Nurmemet Yasin (c. 1977 – c. 2011) was a Uighur author who lived in the People's Republic of China. He was charged for inciting separatism and imprisoned after the publication of his short story "The Wild Pigeon", and in 2013, was reported to have died in prison in 2011.

Nurmemet published three poetry collections: First Love, Crying from the Heart and Come on, Children. His short story "The Wild Pigeon" is a first-person narrative from the point-of-view of a blue pigeon king captured by pigeons of another color; he commits suicide rather than live his life in confinement. The Ministry of State Security objected to the story in part because blue is the color used by some factions of the Uighur independence movement. The story appeared in the Kashgar Literary Journal, a magazine based in Kashgar, Xinjiang. Yasin was arrested a month later.

On 2 February 2005, a court in Kashgar sentenced Yasin to ten years' imprisonment on a charge of inciting separatism. Rebiya Kadeer, president of the World Uyghur Congress, called his arrest an example of "the simple truth ... that whenever Uighurs contradict the official narrative of the benevolence of the Communist Party, they are severely punished". Human Rights Watch cited it as an example of "official policy that criticism or minority expression in art and literature can be deemed a disguised form of secessionism, its author a criminal or even 'terrorist'".

After suffering from ill health, on 1 January 2013, Yasin was reported to have died in Shaya Prison sometime in 2011. Amnesty International stated that "if confirmed, the death of this young writer in prison is a shameful indictment of the Chinese government’s notion of justice".
