= Flag of East Turkestan =

Kök Bayraq
- Use: National flag (Note: These vexillological symbols indicate that the flag shown is a national flag, that it is the normal or de jure version of the flag, and that the reverse (back) side is a mirror of the obverse (front) side.)
- Proportion: 2∶3
- Adopted: 12 November 1933; 93 years ago
- Design: A blue field charged with a white star and crescent slightly left-of-centre

A number of flags have been used to represent the cultural and geographical region of East Turkestan in Central Asia, particularly by states that broke away from China during rebellions in the late 19th and early 20th centuries. Nearly all the flags feature a star and crescent, a symbol of the region's Turkic and Islamic identity.

The most well-known flag is the Kök Bayraq (Uyghur: كۆك بايراق, lit. 'blue flag'), introduced by the government of the short-lived First East Turkestan Republic (1933–1934). It is a blue field charged with a white star and crescent slightly left-of-centre. It is identical to the flag of Turkey, albeit with a blue background instead of red. The Kök Bayraq remains a prominent symbol of the East Turkestan independence movement and the Uyghur diaspora. The Second East Turkestan Republic (1944–1946) introduced a similar star-and-crescent flag but with a green background. Former officials of the republic have also reported seeing a white flag with either a yellow star and crescent or the Shahada in gold text. The Kök Bayraq is banned in China by the country's national security law.

== History ==
=== Kashgaria (Yettishar) ===
(Note: This vexillological symbol indicates that the flag shown was historically used but is not currently used.) Flag of the Ottoman Empire, which flew over Kashgar from 1873 to 1877

The breakaway state of Kashgaria (Yettishar) flew the flag of the Ottoman Empire from 1873 to 1877. A large Muslim revolt against Qing rule erupted in East Turkestan in 1862. The Kokandi military leader Yakub Beg conquered several oases in the region's west and proclaimed an emirate centered around Kashgar in 1864. Seyyid Yaqub Khan Töre, an official Kokandi envoy, made four trips to Istanbul from 1865 to 1875 to request Ottoman support for Yakub Beg. By the time of his last trip in April 1875, the Ottoman flag had already been flying over Kashgar for two years. In August 1875, the Ottoman sultan bestowed upon Yakub the title of emir and the Sancak-ı Şerif (the sultan's holy flag), and sent military advisors and weapons to assist Yakub Beg's army. An expeditionary army sent by the Qing reconquered the area after Yakub Beg's sudden death in 1877. Töre petitioned the Ottoman sultan to persuade the Qing emperor to withdraw his forces from Kashgaria, citing Kashgar's raising of the Ottoman flag as evidence of Ottoman sovereignty over the area. Töre's request was ignored.

=== First East Turkestan Republic ===
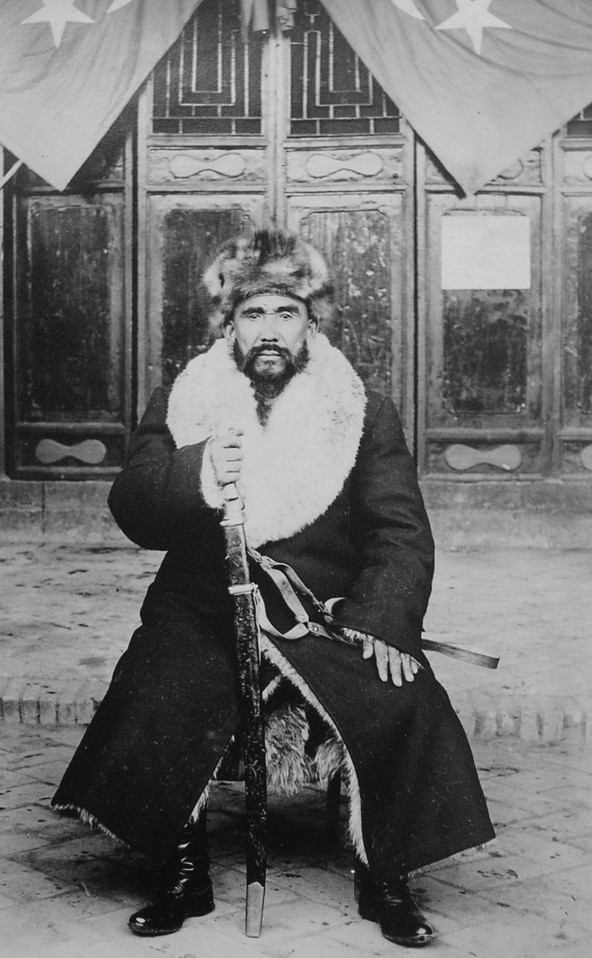
Khoja Niyaz, president of the First East Turkestan Republic, in front of the Kök Bayraq in January 1934

The Kök Bayraq was adopted as the flag of the First East Turkestan Republic upon its proclamation of independence on 12 November 1933. Pan-Turkic and pan-Islamic sentiments among the Turkic population of East Turkestan culminated in local resistance against Chinese rule and the foundation of the republic in Khotan. A government with a constitution and legislature was established, with the Kök Bayraq specifically defined in the former.

The design of a blue field with a white star and crescent, nearly identical to the Turkish flag, was meant to symbolise the republic's cultural and political ties to Turkey. While the Turkish public expressed enthusiasm at the republic's founding, the Turkish foreign ministry exercised caution. The Turkish foreign minister acknowledged Turkey's "feelings for a people which speaks her language" and reasserted the right of every nation to self-determination, but denied any connection to the republic. The Turkish government focused on reconstruction during the interwar period and prioritised stable relations with the Soviet Union, which was the most influential power in East Turkestan at the time due to its control of Soviet Central Asia. The fledging republic therefore received no support from the Turkish state and ultimately collapsed with the capture of Kashgar by the Hui Muslim forces of the Ma clique on 6 February 1934.

=== Second East Turkestan Republic ===
On 7 November 1944, uprisings against Chinese rule erupted in the three northern districts of Ili, Tarbagatay, and Altay. Five days later, the Second East Turkestan Republic (officially just the East Turkestan Republic or ETR) was proclaimed in Ghulja (Yining). The new state was covertly supported by the Soviet Union, but its leadership was dominated by religious conservatives who saw it as a restoration of the First East Turkestan Republic. A green flag charged with a star and crescent was adopted as the national flag of the ETR, with the green symbolising Islam. Former ETR education minister Seypidin Azizi and former East Turkestan National Army officer Batur Ershidinov, (Note: Uyghur: باتۇر ئەرشىدىنوف; variously transliterated as Batur Ershidinov, Batur Arshidinov, or Batur Ärshidinov.) both speaking in retrospect decades after the ETR's dissolution, reported seeing such a flag. Seypidin stated the star and crescent were white, while Batur did not mention their colour. Seypidin also claimed to have seen another flag, a white field with the Shahada written in gold, while Batur stated that a white field with a yellow star and crescent was used as an Islamic flag.

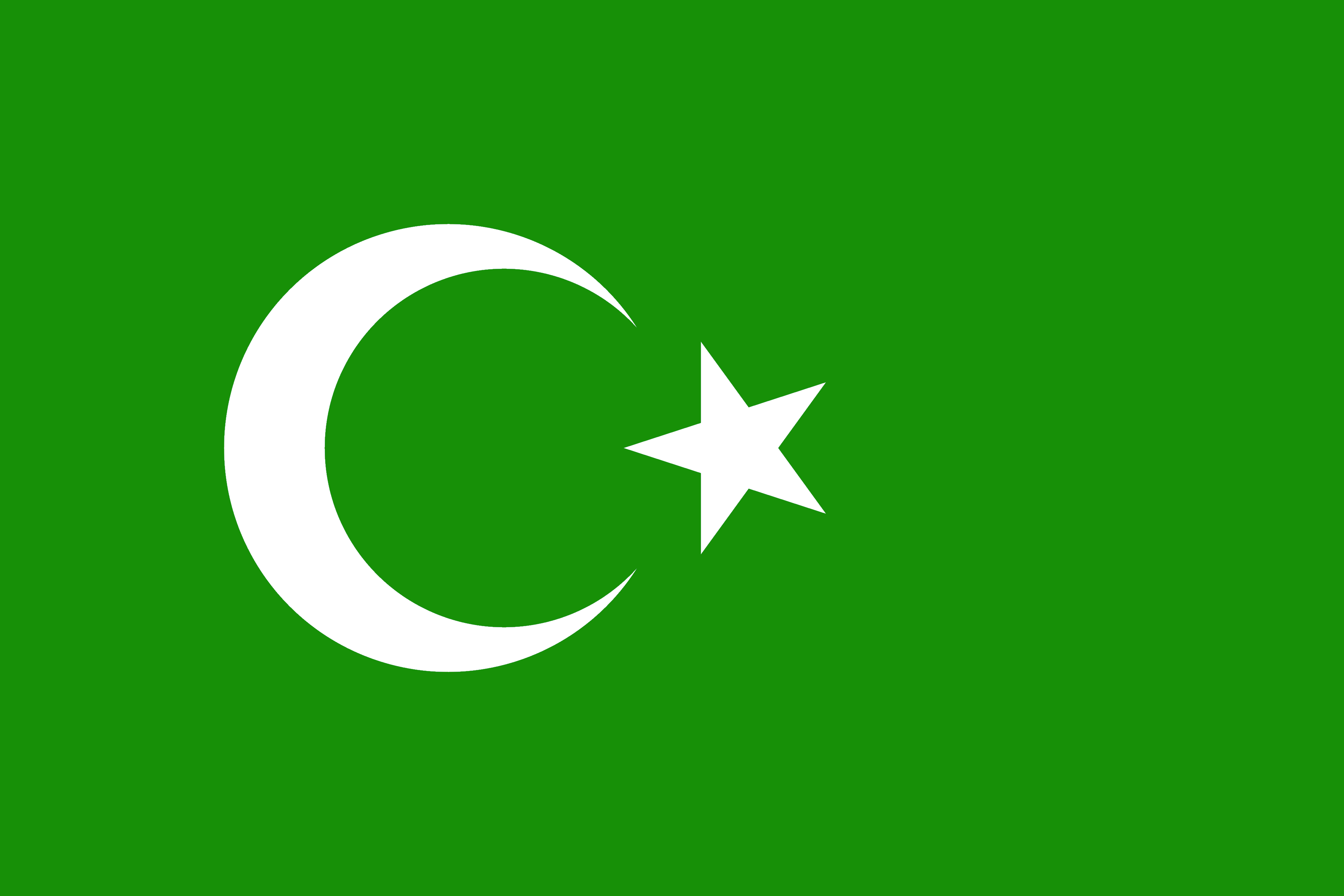
(Note: This vexillological symbol indicates that the flag shown is a reconstruction based on historical documents and not necessarily accurate to how it actually looked.) Reconstruction of the star-and-crescent flag described by Seypidin Azizi

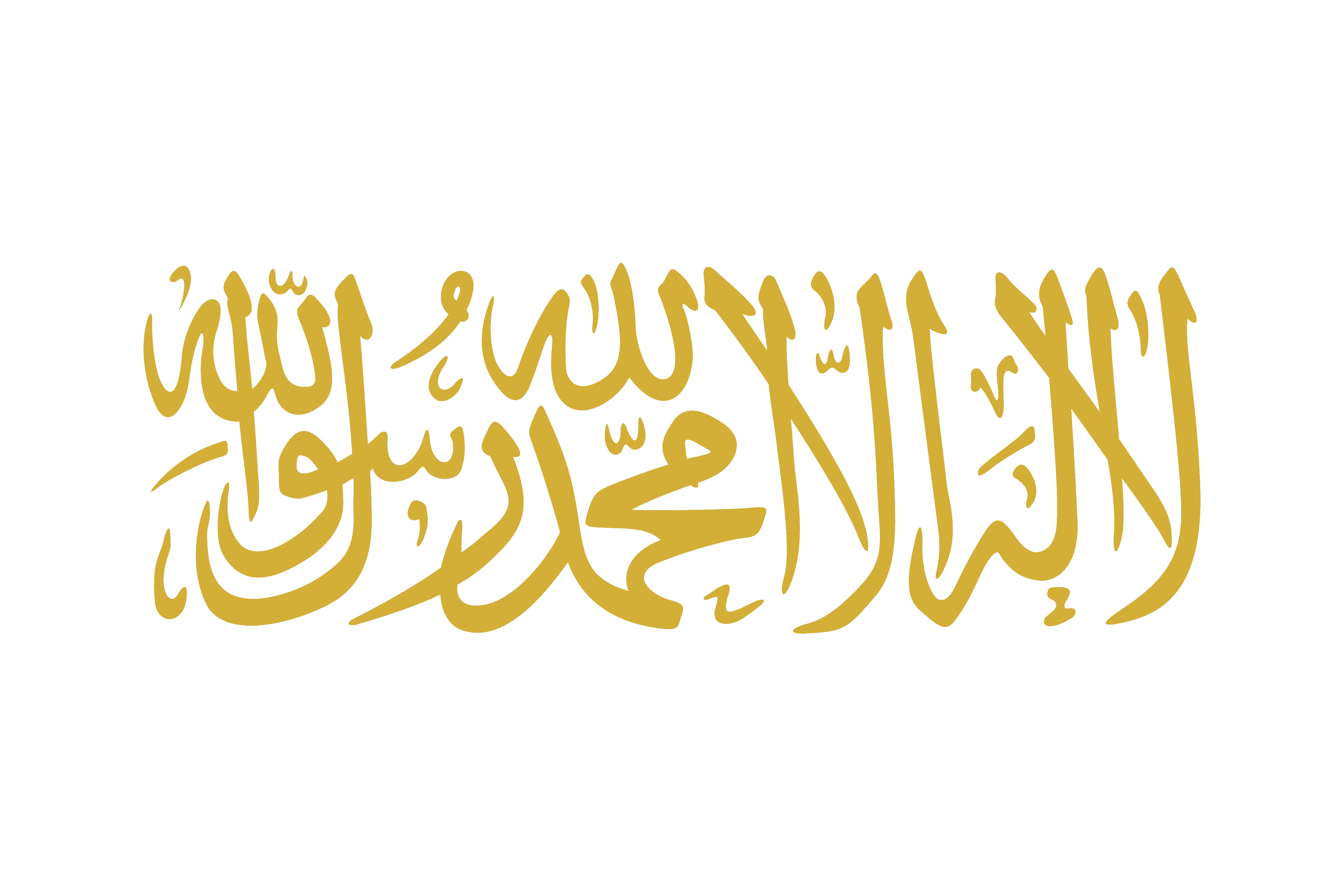
Reconstruction of the Shahada flag described by Seypidin Azizi

Reconstruction of the Islamic flag described by Batur Ershidinov

== Contemporary usage ==
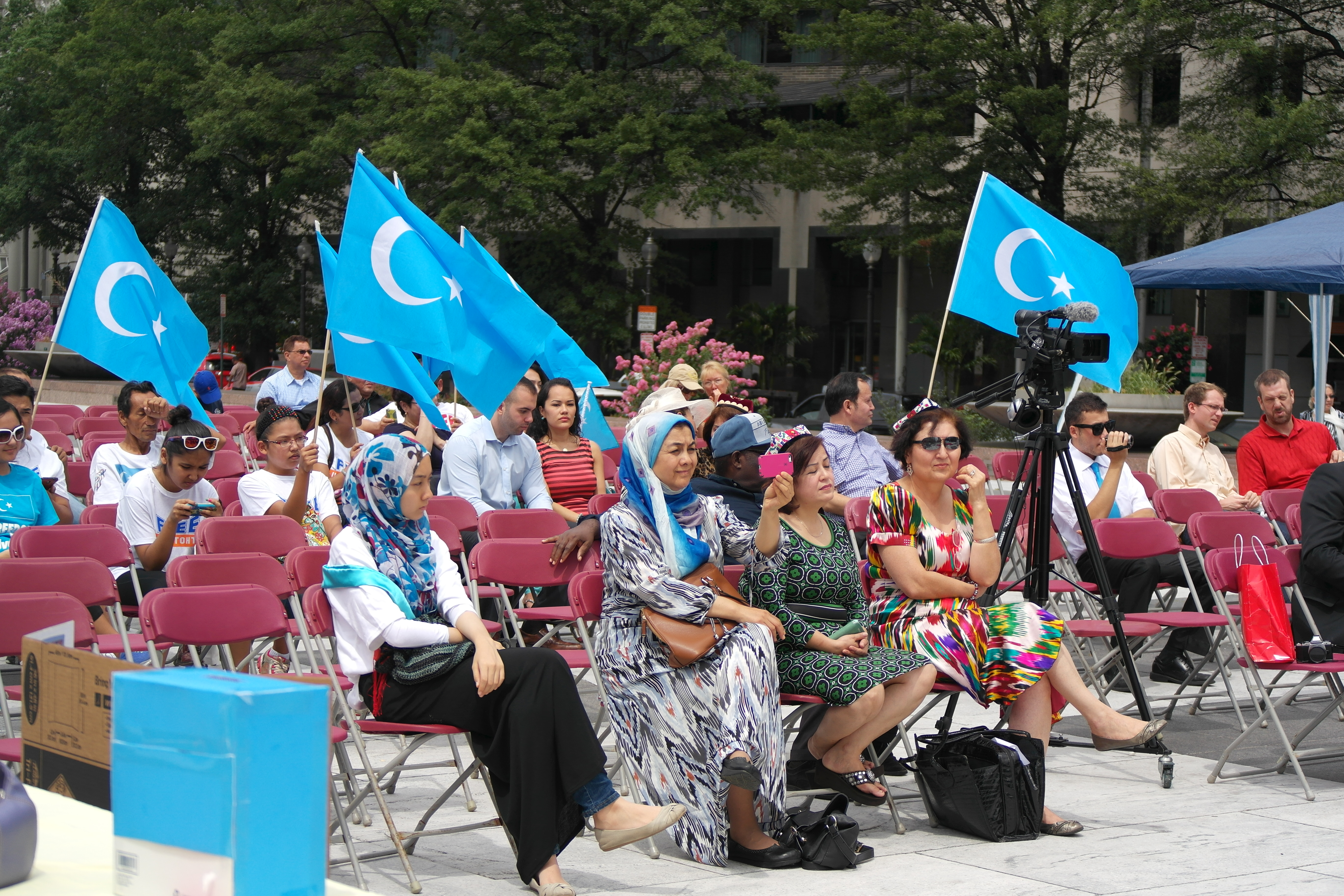
The Kök Bayraq at an East Turkestan event in Washington, D.C., in 2014

The Kök Bayraq is frequently used by supporters of the East Turkestan independence movement, Uyghur nationalists, and Turkic diaspora communities to represent East Turkestan or the Uyghur people in particular. The East Turkestan Government in Exile claims the Kök Bayraq as its national flag in its constitution. Displaying the Kök Bayraq is illegal in China under the country's national security law. The Kök Bayraq was previously banned in Turkey as well during the tenure of prime minister Mesut Yılmaz.

The flag has also been flown at numerous anti-Chinese government protests, including demonstrations held in Istanbul, Washington D.C., New York City, Hong Kong, and Taipei. On 22 December 2019, Hong Kong pro-democracy protesters held a rally in solidarity with East Turkestan independence supporters, amid wider anti-government protests. Many demonstrators waved the Kök Bayraq or wore face masks with the flag on it. The Kök Bayraq was banned in Hong Kong with the introduction of the 2020 Hong Kong national security law, which prohibits all symbols of separatism from China.

During the 2022 Winter Olympics in Beijing, Turkish ski jumper Fatih Arda İpcioğlu competed with light-blue skis featuring a star and crescent. Uyghur activists praised İpcioğlu, believing his skis deliberately depicted the Kök Bayraq. However, İpcioğlu later declined interview questions about the Kök Bayraq, insisting that his skis were meant to depict the Turkish flag and that he was merely a sportsman. The Turkish National Olympic Committee echoed İpcioğlu's statements, commenting to Reuters: "This was not a political statement. As you may know, the official Turkish flag includes a white crescent and a star on it."

== Construction of the Kök Bayraq ==
Construction sheet of the Kök Bayraq

Letter	Measure	Size (Note: Measurement relative to G)
G	Width	G
A	Distance between the centre of the outer crescent and the seam of the white band	1/2 G
B	Diameter of the outer circle of the crescent	1/2 G
C	Distance between the centres of the inner and outer circles of the crescent	1/16 G
D	Diameter of the inner circle of the crescent	2/5 G
E	Distance between the inner circle of the crescent and the circle around the star	1/3 G
F	diameter of the circle around the star	1/4 G
L	Length	1 1/2 G
M	Width of the white hem at the hoist	1/30 G

== See also ==
- Emblem of East Turkestan
- List of Chinese flags
