= East Turkestan independence movement =

Independence movement in China

- The Kök Bayraq is a symbol of the East Turkestan independence movement.

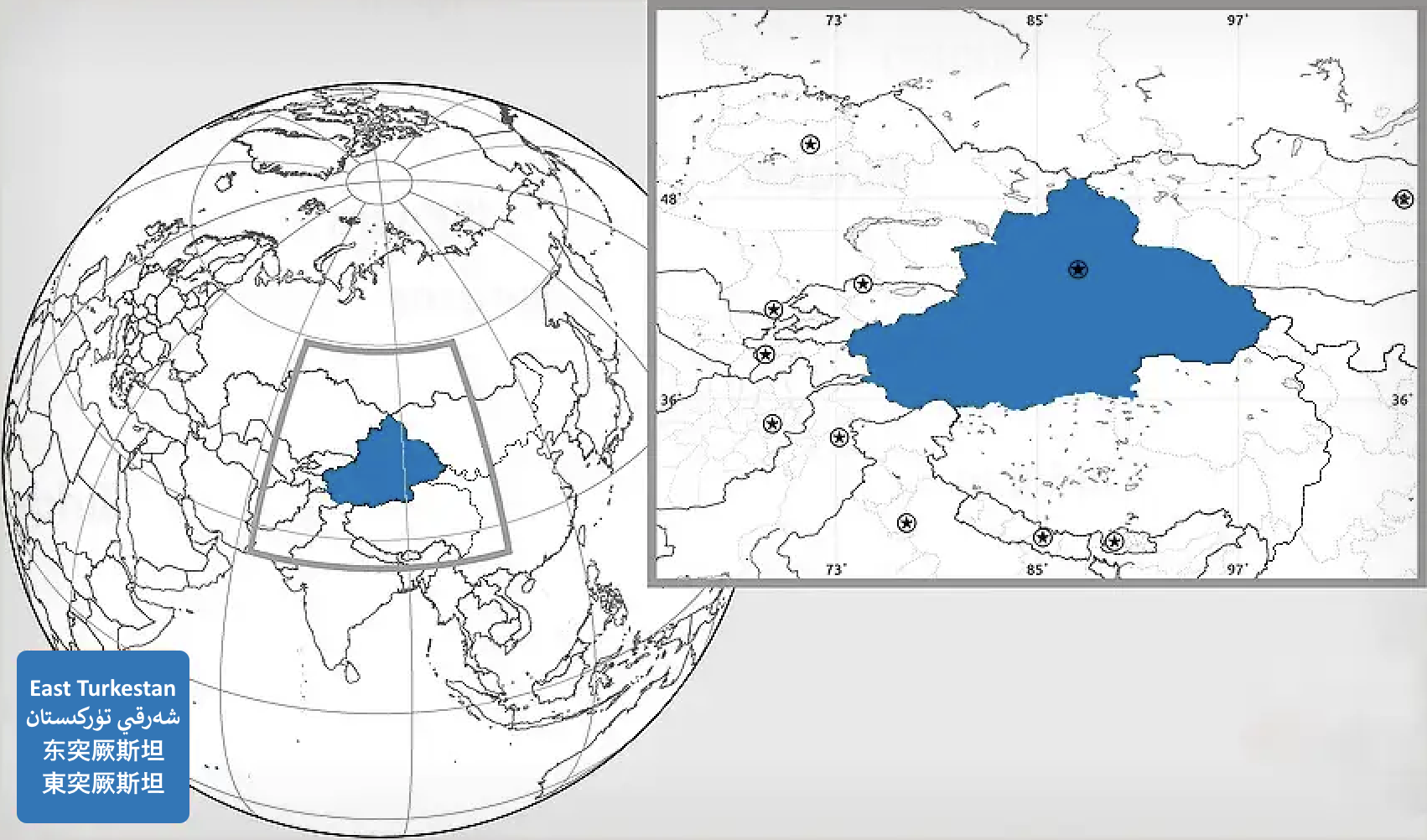
- Claimed territory of the East Turkistan Government in Exile

Uyghur name
- Uyghur: شەرقىي تۈركىستان مۇستەقىللىق ھەرىكىتى
Transcriptions
- Latin Yëziqi: Sherqiy Türkistan Musteqilliq Herikiti
- Siril Yëziqi: Шәрқий Түркистан Мустәқиллиқ Һәрикити

Chinese name
- Simplified Chinese: 东突厥斯坦独立运动
- Traditional Chinese: 東突厥斯坦獨立運動
Transcriptions
Standard Mandarin
- Hanyu Pinyin: Dōng Tūjuésītǎn dúlì yùndòng

This emblem, featuring the basmalah-stylized tughra (calligraphic monogram), is sometimes used alongside the flag above.

The East Turkestan independence movement is a political movement that seeks the independence of East Turkestan, a large and sparsely populated region in northwest China, as a nation state for the Uyghur people. The region is currently administered by the People's Republic of China (PRC) in the Xinjiang Uygur Autonomous Region (XUAR). Within the movement, there is widespread support for the region to be renamed, since "Xinjiang" (meaning "new territory" in Chinese) is seen by independence activists as a colonial name. "East Turkestan" is the best-known proposed name as it is the historical geographic name of the region and the name of the two independent states that briefly existed in the region in the first half of the 20th century.

Large parts of Xinjiang were under intermittent influence of the Chinese, since roughly 2,000 years ago during the Han dynasty. In 101 BC, during the Han dynasty the far eastern parts of the region was settled by the Chinese military garrisons, and outposts such as canton points were established, where each point became the initial distribution area for the Han military garrisons after entering the region. After the establishment of the Protectorate of the Western Regions in 60 BCE, Han settlers entered the Tarim Basin. The Tang dynasty also influenced the Western Regions until Chinese influence was lost in the 8th century, and direct control of the region would not resume until the Qing dynasty a thousand years later.

In the 18th century, Uyghurs rebelled against the ruling Dzungar Khanate. The Manchu Qing dynasty took control of the region in 1756 during the Dzungar–Qing Wars and established Xinjiang as an administrative region in 1759. Xinjiang was subsequently inherited by the Republic of China (ROC), which succeeded the Qing dynasty after the 1911 Revolution, and then by the PRC, which mostly succeeded the ROC after the Chinese Communist Revolution (1949), although Taiwan proper and its surrounding islands have remained under ROC rule until the present day. Throughout Qing and ROC rule, there were several periods of brief de facto independence for either the entire region of Xinjiang or parts of it, as well as foreign occupation and warlord governance. The PRC incorporation of Xinjiang occurred soon after the PRC was established in 1949, and since then, Xinjiang has remained part of China. Historically, the region had various independent states, mostly nomadic hordes, prior to the 1750s. Xinjiang has been a hotbed of ethnic and religious conflict throughout much of the period that it has been governed by successive Chinese regimes.

The Chinese government considers all support for the East Turkestan independence movement to fall under the definitions of "terrorism, extremism, and separatism" (a.k.a. the "Three Evils"). The East Turkestan independence movement is supported by both militant Islamic extremist groups which have been designated terrorist organizations by several countries and the United Nations, such as the Turkistan Islamic Party, as well as advocacy groups and NGOs, such as the East Turkistan National Awakening Movement and the East Turkistan Government-in-Exile, which is based in Washington, D.C.

== Proposed name ==
The most common name for Xinjiang used by independence advocates is "East Turkestan" (or "Uyghurstan"). There is no consensus among secessionists about whether to use "East Turkestan" or "Uyghurstan"; "East Turkestan" has the advantage of also being the name of two historical political entities in the region, while Uyghurstan appeals to modern ideas of ethnic self-determination. Uyghurstan is also a difference in emphasis in that it excludes more peoples in Xinjiang than just the Han, but the "East Turkestan" movement is still a Uyghur phenomenon. The name "East Turkestan" is not currently used in an official sense by most sovereign states and intergovernmental organizations. Another proposed alternative is "Yarkand" or "Yarkent," which harkens back to the Yarkent Khanate, a powerful Uyghur state in the 16th and 17th centuries.

== History ==
=== Yaqub Beg establishment of Kashgaria ===
The Kokandi Yaqub Beg was invited by local rebels to Kashgar during the Dungan revolt and helped establish the independent state of Yettishar.

Also, during the Dungan revolt, the Taranchi Turkic Muslims in Xinjiang initially cooperated with the Dungans (Chinese Muslims) when they rose in revolt, but turned on them, because the Dungans, mindful of their Chinese heritage, attempted to subject the entire region to their rule. The Taranchi massacred the Dungans at Kuldja and drove the rest through the Talk pass into the Ili valley.

=== Within the Republic of China (1912–1949) ===
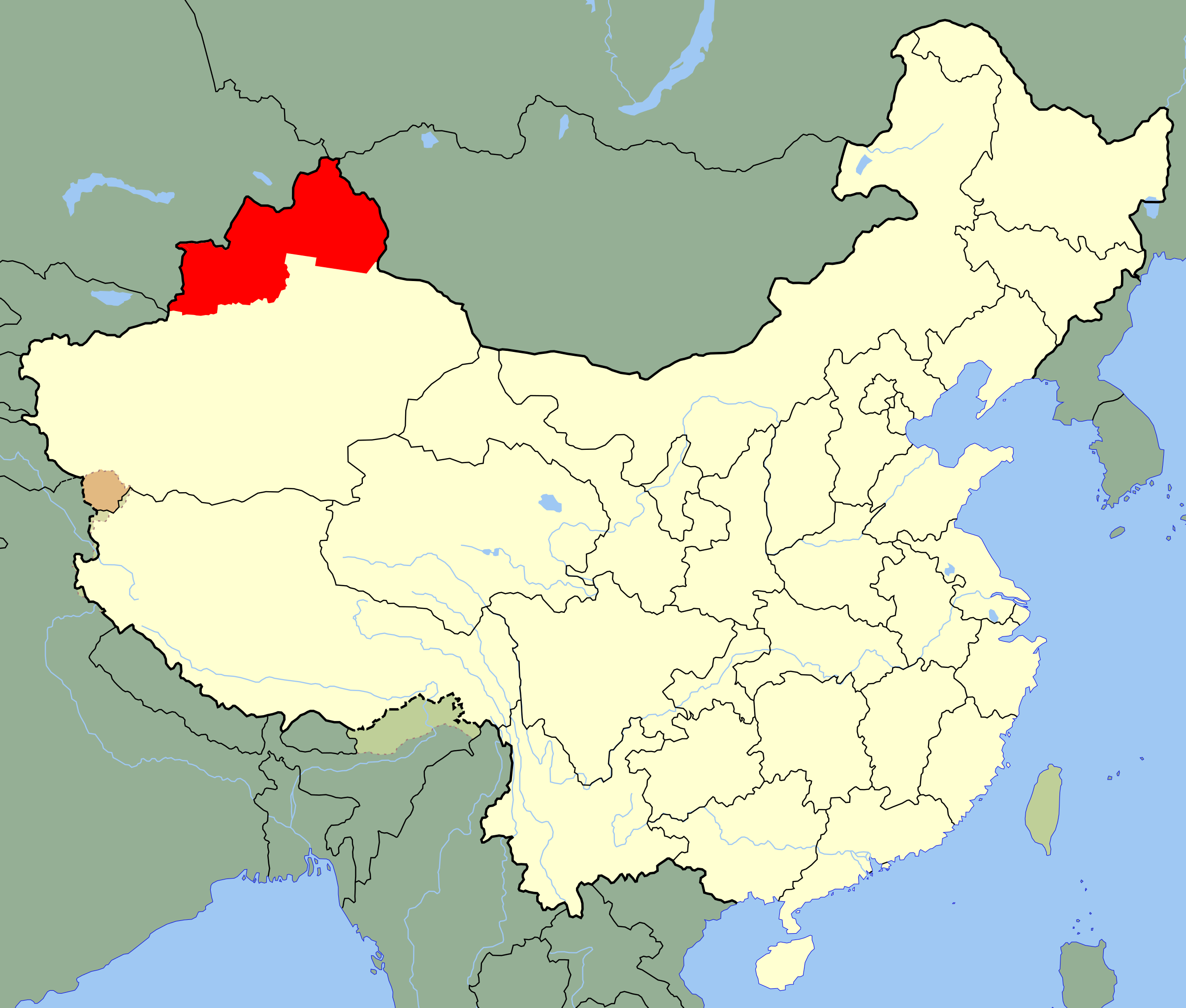
The Second East Turkestan Republic was a short-lived Soviet-backed unrecognized republic in northern Xinjiang.

After the collapse of the Qing dynasty, the region became largely free of the control of the government of Republic of China (ROC). An early attempt at East Turkestan independence was the establishment of the short-lived "First East Turkestan Republic" (aka "Turkish Islamic Republic of East Turkestan"), which lasted between 1933 and 1934. This republic was formed following a rebellion in Kashgar against the ROC, which had been in the process of asserting control over Kashgar after two decades of Warlordism in the ROC. The Chinese Hui Muslim 36th Division (National Revolutionary Army) suppressed the First East Turkestan Republic following Chinese (ROC) victories at the Battle of Kashgar (1933) and Battle of Kashgar (1934).

During the later years of China under the ROC, which was engaged against the Chinese Communists in the context of the Chinese Civil War, the Soviet Union under leader Joseph Stalin invaded Xinjiang and assisted a local rebellion at Ili (Yining City). The rebellion led to the establishment of the Second East Turkistan Republic (1944–1949), which existed in three northern districts (Ili, Tarbaghatai, Altai) of Xinjiang with secret aid from the Soviet Union. After emerging victorious at the conclusion of the Chinese Civil War in 1949, the People's Liberation Army annexed Xinjiang from the ROC and the Second East Turkestan Republic.

=== Within the People's Republic of China (1949–present) ===
Since the reform and opening up from the late 1970s exacerbated uneven regional development, while Uyghurs have migrated to urbanizing Xinjiang cities, some Hans have also migrated to Xinjiang for independent economic advancement. Increased ethnic contact and labor competition coincided with Uyghur separatist terrorism from the 1990s, such as the 1997 Ürümqi bus bombings.

A police roundup of suspected separatists during Ramadan resulted in large demonstrations that turned violent in February 1997 in an episode known as the Ghulja Incident that led to at least 9 deaths. The Ürümqi bus bombings of 25 February 1997, perhaps a response to the crackdown that followed the Ghulja Incident, killed 9 and injured 68. Speaking on separatist violence, Erkin Alptekin, a former East Turkestan National Congress chairman and prominent Uyghur activist, said: "We must emphasize dialog and warn our youth against the use of violence because it delegitimizes our movement".

==== Recent events ====
Despite much talk of separatism and terrorism in Xinjiang, especially after the September 11 attacks in the United States and the US invasion of Afghanistan, the situation in Xinjiang was quiet from around 1998 to mid-2006. In 2005, Uyghur author Nurmemet Yasin was sentenced to ten years' imprisonment for inciting separatism following his publication of an allegorical short story, "The Blue Pigeon". Rebiya Kadeer claimed that Turkey is hampered from interfering with the Uyghurs because it recognizes that the Kurdish-Turkish conflict may receive interference from China in retaliation.

== Views on independence ==
=== Arguments in favor of independence ===
Several proponents of independence state that the Uyghurs have had a defined history in Xinjiang for "over 4,000 years". There are historical arguments for the independence of Xinjiang, such as the argument that the People's Republic of China is a colonial occupier of Xinjiang, rather than it naturally being an integral part of the sovereign state which traditionally includes Xinjiang. Evidence for this argument usually consists of claims that the PRC is not the legitimate successor state to either the ROC (now based in Taiwan) or the previous imperial dynasty of China, which is the Qing dynasty, or that previous regimes were also illegitimate.

=== Arguments against independence ===
The Government of China is strongly opposed to the idea of Xinjiang (East Turkestan) independence and its supporters are subject to harsh criminal penalties. China officially claims that Xinjiang has been part of China since the Han dynasty of China (220 BC – AD 206) established a Protectorate of the Western Regions in 60 BC. Historically, various Chinese governments have described invasions of Xinjiang as a sort of "reconquest" of previously lost territories ever since the Han and Tang dynasties.

Some Uyghur nationalist historians such as Turghun Almas claim that Uyghurs were distinct and independent from Chinese for 6,000 years, and that all other ethnic groups are later immigrants to Xinjiang. Records show that military colonies (tuntian) and commanderies (duhufu) were set up by the Han dynasty to control Xinjiang, while the Tang dynasty (618–907) also controlled much of Xinjiang until the An Lushan rebellion. Chinese historians refute Uyghur nationalist claims by pointing out the 2,000-year history of Han settlement in Xinjiang, documenting the history of Mongol, Kazakh, Uzbek, Manchu, Hui, Xibo indigenes in Xinjiang, and by emphasizing the relatively late "westward migration" of the Huihu (equated with "Uyghur" by the PRC government) people from Mongolia the 9th century. The name "Uyghur" was associated with a Buddhist people in the Tarim Basin in the 9th century, but completely disappeared by the 15th century, until it was revived by the Soviet Union in the 20th century.

=== Chinese government view ===
The government of the People's Republic of China considers all support for the East Turkestan independence movement to fall under the definitions of "terrorism, extremism, and separatism".

In a 2014 speech, CCP general secretary Xi Jinping argued that the dissolution of the Soviet Union demonstrated that economic development alone would not prevent separatism in Xinjiang. He elaborated “In recent years, Xinjiang has grown very quickly and the standard of living has consistently risen, but even so, ethnic separatism and terrorist violence have still been on the rise. This goes to show that economic development does not automatically bring lasting order and security.”

In 2020, the Chinese government published a White Paper on Employment and Labor Rights in Xinjiang, which had been circulated via Xinhua, the Global Times and other public news channels. In this paper, the Chinese Communist Party and government maintain the view that its policies in Xinjiang are directed to realize the (constitutional) mandate to provide employment and the facilitation of employment as the most fundamental project for ensuring and improving people's wellbeing.

=== Right to self-determination ===
While the earliest ROC constitutional documents during the Beiyang era already claim Xinjiang as part of China, Chinese political leaders also acknowledged the principle of self-determination. For example, at a party conference in 1924, Kuomintang leader Sun Yat-sen issued a statement calling for the right of self-determination of all Chinese ethnic groups: "The Kuomintang can state with solemnity that it recognizes the right of self-determination of all national minorities in China and it will organize a free and united Chinese republic."

In 1931, the Chinese Communist Party (CCP) had issued a constitution for the short-lived Chinese Soviet Republic in Jiangxi which states that Uyghurs and other ethnic minorities, "may either join the Union of Chinese Soviets or secede from it."

In 2022 a number of Taiwanese NGOs came out in support of Uyghur self determination.

== Organizations ==
In the 1980s and 1990s, numerous Uyghur organisations representing the Uyghur movement in exile formed around the world but were disorganised and disunited. Some Uyghur organizations use more moderate methods of human rights advocacy to influence the Chinese government within the international community. Other Uyghur organizations advocate for more radical forms of ideological and armed struggle in their push for independence.

=== Government-in-exile ===
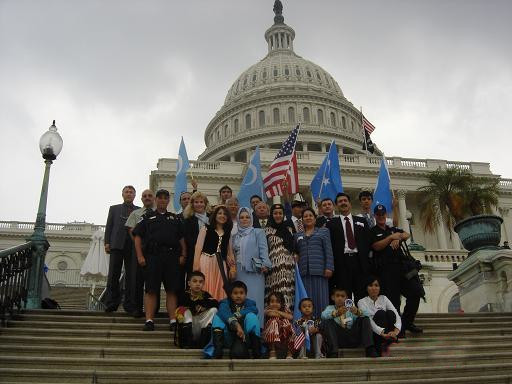
ETGE members at Capitol Hill, Washington D.C., United States on 14 September 2004

- East Turkistan Government-in-Exile (ETGE) – founded in Washington D.C. on 14 September 2004 and advocates for East Turkestani independence.

=== Civil organizations ===
- East Turkistan National Awakening Movement – Located in Washington DC, United States. It was formed on 4 June 2017.

=== Militant organizations ===
Most militant organizations have been labeled terrorist organizations by the PRC, and some other governments as well.

- Turkistan Islamic Party (TIP, also East Turkestan Islamic Movement) – Identified as a terrorist organization by the governments of China, Kazakhstan, Pakistan, Turkey and, until October 2020, the United States, as well as the United Nations.

=== Historical support ===
Historically, organizations which have supported the East Turkestan independence movement include:

- East Turkestan People's Revolutionary Party (ETPRP) – was a Uyghur communist party and was the largest armed separatist group in Xinjiang in its time. The Soviet Union was involved in funding and support to the ETPRP to start a violent uprising against China in 1968.
- United Revolutionary Front of East Turkestan (URFET) – Was a Uyghur nationalist group in the Soviet Union and Xinjiang that participated in the Xinjiang conflict as an armed separatist force. It was believed to be backed by the Soviet Union (1975–1989) and the U.S. (1990s).
- East Turkestan Liberation Organization – Was a secessionist militant Uyghur organization that advocated for an independent Uyghur state in Xinjiang. Widely believed to have links to Taliban and the East Turkestan Islamic Movement.
- Committee for National Revolution – Was a Turkic nationalist Uyghur party which existed in 1932–1934. It helped found the First East Turkestan Republic.
- Young Kashgar Party – Was a Turkic nationalist Uyghur party which existed from 1933 to 1934. It helped found the First East Turkestan Republic.

Opposition includes China, Iran, Palestinian Authority, Turkey, the Shanghai Cooperation Organization among others.

==== Soviet Union ====
The Soviet Union supported the Uyghur Second East Turkestan Republic in the Ili Rebellion against the Republic of China. According to her autobiography, Dragon Fighter: One Woman's Epic Struggle for Peace with China, Rebiya Kadeer's father served with pro-Soviet Uyghur rebels under the Second East Turkestan Republic in the Ili Rebellion (Three Province Rebellion) in 1944–1946, using Soviet assistance and aid to fight the Republic of China government under Chiang Kai-shek. Kadeer and her family were close friends with White Russian exiles living in Xinjiang and Kadeer recalled that many Uyghurs thought Russian culture was "more advanced" than that of the Uyghurs and they "respected" the Russians a lot.

Many of the Turkic peoples of the Ili region of Xinjiang had close cultural, political, and economic ties with Russia and then the Soviet Union. Many of them were educated in the Soviet Union and a community of Russian settlers lived in the region. As a result, many of the Turkic rebels fled to the Soviet Union and obtained Soviet assistance in creating the Sinkiang Turkic People's Liberation Committee (STPNLC) in 1943 to revolt against Kuomintang rule during the Ili Rebellion. The pro-Soviet Uyghur who later became leader of the revolt and the Second East Turkestan Republic, Ehmetjan Qasim, was Soviet educated and described as "Stalin's man".

The Soviet Union incited separatist activities in Xinjiang through propaganda, encouraging Kazakhs to flee to the Soviet Union and attack China. China responded by reinforcing the Xinjiang-Soviet border area specifically with Han Bingtuan militia and farmers. The Soviet Union supported Uyghur nationalist propaganda and Uyghur separatist movements against China. The Soviet historians claimed that the Uyghur native land was Xinjiang and Uyghur nationalism was promoted by Soviet versions of history on turcology. The East Turkestan People's Party received support from the Soviet Union. During the 1970s, the Soviets supported the URFET to fight the Chinese.

== See also ==
- Barin uprising
- List of leaders of Turkestan
- Turkic settlement of the Tarim Basin
- Human rights of ethnic minorities in China
- List of active separatist movements in Asia
