= First East Turkestan Republic =

1933–1934 breakaway state in China

Turkic Islamic Republic of East Turkestan شەرقىي تۈركىستان تۈرك ئىسلام جۇمھۇرىيىتى (Uyghur)
- 1933–1934
- Flag Emblem

- The TIRET claimed the entirety of Xinjiang Province (in green and light green) but exercised actual control over what is now the prefectures of Kashgar, Kizilsu, Khotan, and Aksu (in green).
- Status: Unrecognized state
- Capital and largest city: Kashgar
- Official languages: Uyghur
- Religion: Sunni Islam
- Government: Islamic republic
- President
  - 1933–1934: Khoja Niyaz
- Prime Minister
  - 1933–1934: Sabit Damolla
- Historical era: Interwar period
  - Established: 12 November 1933
  - Disestablished: 16 April 1934
- Currency: Chinese customs gold unit Copper (pūl), silver (tanga) and gold (tilla) coins minted in Kashgar in 1933.
Preceded by	Succeeded by
Xinjiang Province, Republic of China	Xinjiang Province, Republic of China
- Today part of: China ∟ Xinjiang Uyghur Autonomous Region

Turkic Islamic Republic of East Turkestan

Uyghur name
- Uyghur: شەرقىي تۈركىستان تۈرك ئىسلام جۇمھۇرىيىتى
Transcriptions
- Latin Yëziqi: Sherqiy Türkistan Turk-Islam Jumhuriyiti
- Siril Yëziqi: Шәрқий Түркистан Түрк-Ислам Җумхурийити

Chinese name
- Traditional Chinese: 東突厥斯坦伊斯蘭共和國
- Simplified Chinese: 东突厥斯坦伊斯兰共和国
Transcriptions
Standard Mandarin
- Hanyu Pinyin: Dōng Tūjuésītǎn Yīsīlán Gònghéguó
- Wade–Giles: Tung^{1} Tʻu^{1}-chüeh^{2}-si^{1}-tʻan^{3} I^{1}-si^{1}-lan^{2} Kung^{4}-he^{2}-kuo^{2}

The Turkic Islamic Republic of East Turkestan (TIRET) was a breakaway state centered on the city of Kashgar, located in the far west of China's Xinjiang Province. It is often described as the First East Turkestan Republic to differentiate it from the Second East Turkestan Republic (1944–1946) established exactly a decade later.

It emerged from the Kumul Rebellion following the abolition of the semi-autonomous Kumul Khanate by Xinjiang Governor Jin Shuren. Lasting from 12 November 1933 to 16 April 1934, it was primarily the product of a pan-Turkic independence movement in the region, which consisted of Turkic, mostly Uyghur, intellectuals. With the sacking of Kashgar in 1934 by Hui warlords nominally allied with the Kuomintang-led nationalist government in Nanjing, the TIRET was effectively destroyed. Its example, however, served to some extent as inspiration for the founding of the Second East Turkestan Republic a decade later in the north of Xinjiang and continues to influence modern Uyghur nationalist support for the creation of an independent East Turkestan.

== Background ==
The beginnings of Uyghur independence during the early 20th century were greatly influenced by the Turkic jadidist movement, which spread as wealthier Uyghurs, inspired by notions of Pan-Turkism, traveled abroad to Turkey and Europe, and returned home determined to modernize and develop the educational system in Xinjiang. The first major school founded on the new model was located outside of Kashgar and, unlike the traditional curricula, focused on more technical areas of study such as science, mathematics, history, and language studies. Jadidism emphasized the power of education as a tool for personal and national self-advancement, a development sure to disturb the traditional status quo in Xinjiang. The ruler of Xinjiang, Governor Yang Zengxin, responded by closing down or interfering with the operations of several of the new schools.

The birth of the Soviet Union influenced the Uyghurs, increasing the popularity of nationalist independence movements and the spread of the communist message. A local Communist revolutionary organization was established in Xinjiang in 1921 (Revolutionary Uyghur Union, member of Comintern), the area also served as a refuge for many intellectuals fleeing the advent of Soviet Communism in Central Asia, which formed a division within the Xinjiang Turkic independence movement.

The situation in Xinjiang deteriorated with the assassination of Yang Zengxin in 1928 and the rise to power of his deputy, Jin Shuren, who declared himself governor after arresting and executing Yang's assassin, a rival official named Fan Yaonan (樊耀南) who had planned to assume the position for himself. Autocratic, corrupt, and ineffective at managing the province's development, Jin further antagonized the populace by reinstituting Sinicization policies, increasing taxes, prohibiting participation in the hajj and bringing in Han Chinese officials to replace local leaders.

== Rebellion ==
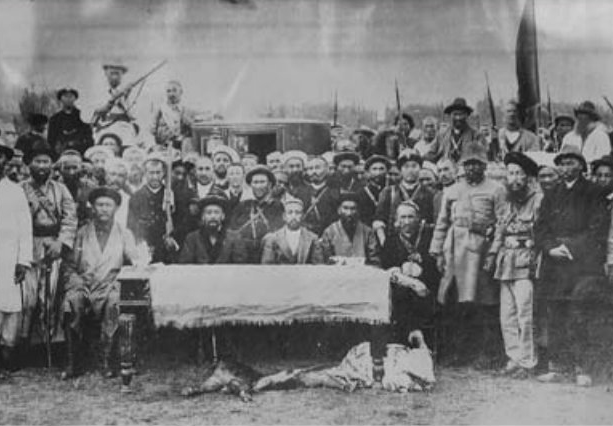
Uyghur rebels in the 1930s

The situation came to a head in March 1930, when Maqsud Shah, the Khan of Kumul Khanate in eastern Xinjiang, died, leading Jin to abolish its autonomy and permit waves of Han migration from the neighboring Gansu. Jin then proceeded to impose direct taxes on the Turkic population, expropriated their farmland, and distributed it among Han newcomers from Gansu, sometimes compensating Uyghurs on poorer-quality land. Additionally, Han were made exempt from taxation for two years, with one year's amount of tax being levied retroactively for the local Muslim population.

The new garrison stationed in Hami proved even more antagonizing, and by 1931, scattered revolts, mobs, and resistance movements were emerging throughout the area. According to British missionaries Mildred Cable and Francesca French, who were resident in the Kumul area during and shortly after Jin's annexation of the Kumul Khanate, a rising against Jin Shuren was being systematically planned by prominent Kumulliks. Camels and mules were requisitioned to transport weapons, ammunition and stocks of food over little-known tracks to two former summer Khan's palaces in Aratam on the foot of Karlik Tagh Mountains and one at the natural fortress of Bardash set high in Karlik Tagh. The final straw was in April 1931 when an ethnic Chinese officer and tax collector named Chang Mu wished to marry a Uyghur girl from a village Hsiao-Pu outside Hami. Uyghur accounts usually claim that the girl was raped or the family coerced, but as Islamic law forbids Muslim girls to marry non-Muslim men it was clearly offensive to the Uyghur community.

Rebellion broke out on the night of 4 April 1931, with a massacre of Chang and his 32 soldiers at the wedding ceremony; 100 Han Chinese families of refugees from Gansu also were killed, altogether with Chinese garrisons in outposts at villages Tu-lu-Hu and Lao-mao-hu near Kumul. It was not confined to the ethnic Uyghur population alone; Kazakhs, Kyrgyz, Han and Hui commanders all joined in revolt against Jin's rule, though they would occasionally break to fight one another.

The Soviet government further complicated the situation by dispatching troops to come to the aid of Jin and his military commander Sheng Shicai, as did White Russian refugees from the Soviet Union living in the Ili river valley region.

The main fighting initially centered around Ürümqi, which Hui forces laid under siege until Sheng Shicai's troops were reinforced by White Russian and Manchurian soldiers who had previously fled the Japanese invasion of northeast China. In April 1933, Jin was deposed by a combination of these forces and succeeded by Sheng, who enjoyed Soviet support. Newly bolstered, Sheng split the opposing forces around Ürümqi by offering several Uyghur commanders (led by Khoja Niyaz Hajji, an advisor to the newly elected Kumul Khan Nazir (聶滋爾), the second son of recently deceased Kumul Khan Maqsud Shah, and to Nazir's eldest son and his designated heir Bashir (伯錫爾) with whom he studied together in religious school " Khanliq " in Kumul in their childhood) positions of power in Southern Xinjiang if they would agree to turn against the Hui armies in the north, led by Ma Zhongying.

Another Hui faction in Southern Xinjiang under command of Ma Zhancang, meanwhile, had struck an alliance with Uyghur forces located around Kucha under the leadership of Timur Beg, occupied Kucha without hostilities and proceeded to march towards Aksu, capturing the small town of Baicheng en route. On 25 February 1933 rebel forces entered Aksu Old City, shot all the Chinese residents and seized their property; it seemed probable that this was the work of Temur's men, as the Hui (Tungan) forces of Ma Zhancang are reported to have peacefully occupied Aksu New City, where they took possession of both the Arsenal and the Treasury, their contents were reportedly sent to the Hui headquarters in Kara Shar. Later Ma Zhancang at the head of approximately 300 well-armed Hui troops and Temur at the head of an estimated 4,700 ill-armed Uyghur irregulars resumed their advance on Maral Bashi and Kashgar. On 13 April 1933 Ma Shaowu (馬紹武), the Head of Chinese administration in Southern Xinjiang, ordered Chinese Brigadier Yang to leave Maral Bashi front and return to Kashgar with troops because of rapidly deteriorating of the situation in Southern Xinjiang, that was not improved by the refusal of the British Indian Government to send troops to the assistance of the Chinese at Kashgar despite an official request made to the British Consul-General at Kashgar N.Fitzmaurice (was in office from May 1922 to July 1922 and again from September 1931 to November 1933) by Ma Shaowu on 25 February 1933. It was all too apparent that no help would be forthcoming from Ürümqi, after the cutting of telegraph links between Kashgar and Ürümqi at Aksu. Brigadier Yang troops were attacked by Hui and Uyghur rebels on march and of his original force, estimated well over 1,000 troops, a mere sixty five had straggled back to Kashgar by 27 April. Later the joint Uyghur and Hui force surrounding Kashgar split again, as Ma Zhancang allied with the local provincial authority representative, a fellow Hui named Ma Shaowu, and attacked the Uyghur forces, killing Timur Beg.

A Kyrgyz rebellion had earlier broken out in Xinjiang in 1932, led by the Kyrgyz leader Id Mirab. Ma Shaowu had crushed and defeated the Kyrgyz rebels. The Soviet Union had been involved in also fighting against the rebels, who had spilled over to the Soviet side. In March 1932, large number of Kyrgyz were driven across the Xinjiang frontier by pursuing Soviet forces. A series of guerrilla counter-attacks against the Soviets were mounted from Chinese territory and in raids on Koksu and two other Soviet posts a total of thirty seven Soviet troops were killed.

While this was transpiring, in the nearby southern Tarim Basin city of Khotan, three brothers of rich Bughra family, Muhammad Amin Bughra, Abdullah Bughra and Nur Ahmadjan Bughra, educated in the jadidist tradition, in February 1933 had led a rebellion of gold miners who worked in Surghak mines near Keriya city, also in Yurunkash and Karakash mountain rivers, and established themselves as emirs of the city, having declared the Khotan Emirate and independence from China on 16 March 1933.

== Establishment ==
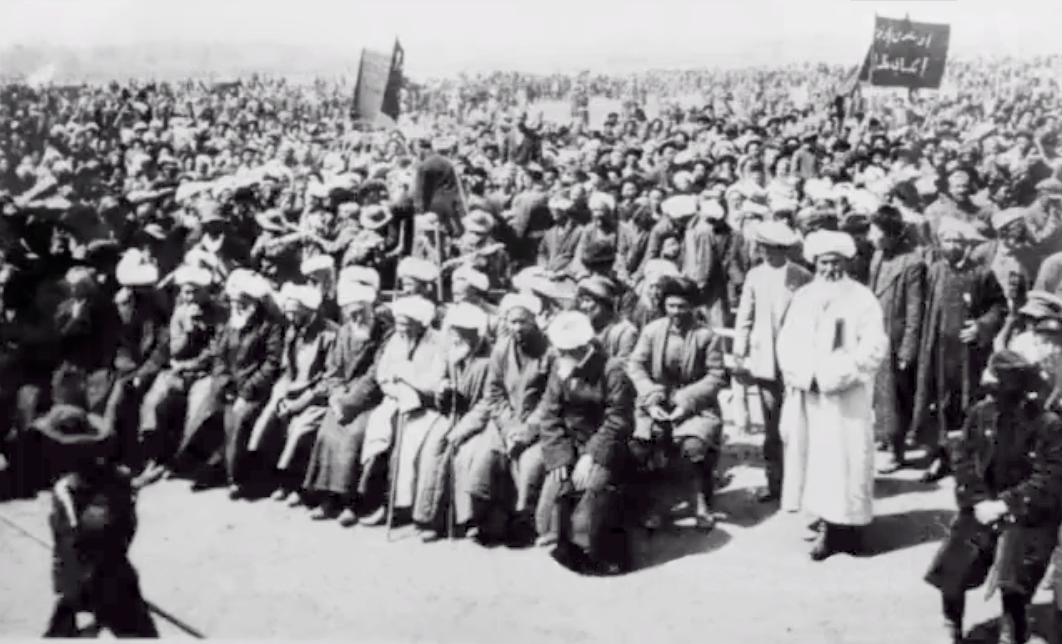
Establishment of the Turkic Islamic Republic of East Turkestan on 12 November 1933, in Kashgar

Leader of Karakash gold miners Ismail Khan Khoja sent message to Governor Jin Shuren: "Foolish infidels like you are not fit to rule.... You infidels think that because you have rifles, guns... and money, you can depend on them, but we depend of God in whose hands are our lives." Local provincial authorities and troops were annihilated by the miners throughout Khotan vilayet, rare Chinese population in most cases saved their lives and property, but was forced to accept Islam under the threat of execution. Old City of Khotan fell to rebels on 28 February 1933 with minimal resistance, the same day when rebels entered the city, while Khotan New City came under siege before surrendering on 16 March 266 Han soldiers of its garrison were spared and reportedly converted to Islam, while both the Treasury and Arsenal were captured by rebels, delivering to their hands several thousands of rifles and almost a ton of gold.

The Khotan Emirate dispatched one of the three brothers, Shahmansur, known also as Emir Abdullah, and a former publisher named Sabit Damolla to Kashgar, where they established the Kashgar Affairs Office of the Khotan Government, led by Muhammad Amin Bughra, in July 1933. By the fall of that year, the office had shed many of its links to the Khotan government and reformed itself into the multi-ethnic, quasi-nationalist East Turkestan Independence Association, which drew heavily on ideas of Islamic reformism, nationalism and jadidism.

On 12 November 1933, Sabit Damolla declared the establishment of the East Turkestan Republic with Khoja Niyaz as its president — despite the fact that the respected commander was engaged in fighting in northern Xinjiang and had allied his forces with those of Sheng Shicai. Original proclamation was extremely anti-Hui and anti-Han and contained such words:

The Tungans [Hui], more than Han, are the enemy of our people. Today our people are already free from the oppression of the Han, but still continue live under Tungan subjugation. We must still fear the Han, but cannot not fear the Tungans as well. The reason, we must be careful to guard against the Tungans, we must intensively oppose them, cannot afford to be polite, since the Tungans have compelled us to follow this way. Yellow Han people have not the slightest thing to do with Eastern Turkestan. Black Tungans also do not have this connection. Eastern Turkestan belongs to the people of Eastern Turkestan. There is no need for foreigners to come be our fathers and mothers.... From now on we do not need to use foreigner's language or their names, their customs, habits, attitudes, written languages, etc. We must also overthrow and drive foreigners from our boundaries forever. The colors yellow and black are foul.... They have dirtied our Land for too long. So now it's absolutely necessary to clean out this filth. Take down the yellow and black barbarians! Live long Eastern Turkestan!

On 12 November 1933, an independent republic, the Turkic Islamic Republic of Eastern Turkestan (TIRET; or Republic of Uyghurstan, both names were used at the same time) was proclaimed. This event was organized on Sunday morning in a mass rally on the shore of Tuman River outside of Kashgar with the participation of about 7,000 troops and 13,000 civilians, including teachers and students of schools, who delivered speeches along with appointed "Ministers" of the independent republic. On noon cannon fired 41 times and crowd proceeded to the Old City of Kashgar, waving blue banners of Independence, where rally continued on the square in front of Id Kah Mosque and more speeches were delivered from Mosque's front, where Sabit Damulla appeared as a main speaker.

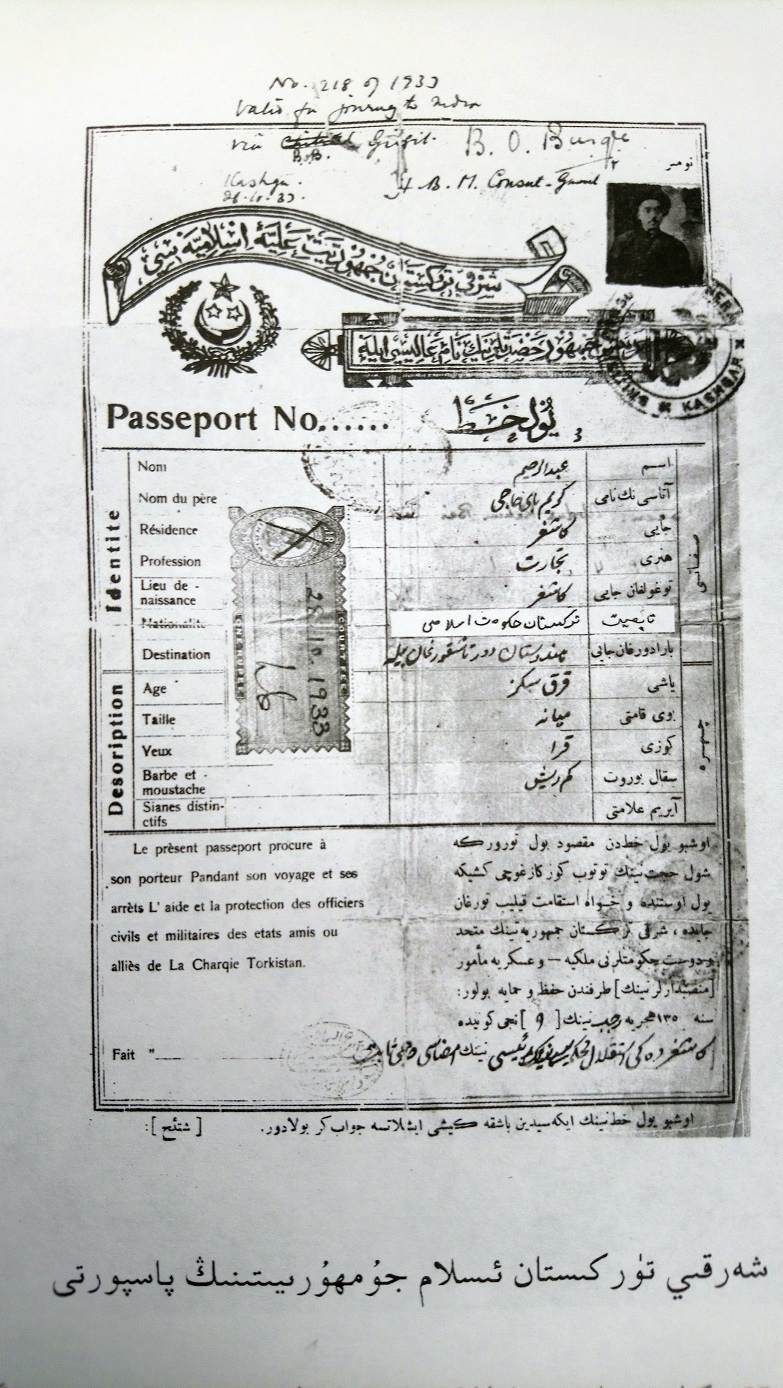

Established distinct from the Khotan Emirate, the TIRET claimed authority over territory stretching from Aksu along the northern rim of the Tarim Basin to Khotan in the south. Khoja Niyaz did not join Republic in November 1933 and kept a separate administration in Aksu that was involved in negotiations with the Soviet Union. In fact, the government in Kashgar was strapped for resources, plagued by rapid inflation, and surrounded by hostile powers — including the Hui forces under Ma Zhancang.

Although established as a multiethnic republic, as reflected in the choice of the "East Turkestan" name used in its founding constitution, the first coins of the new government were initially minted under the name "Republic of Uyghurstan" (Uyghurstan Jumhuriyiti). In some sources, it is known as the "East Turkestan Islamic Republic", suggesting a greater role for Islam in its founding character. The extent of Islam's influence in the foundation of the TIRET is disputed; while the constitution endorses sharia as the guiding law, the jadidist modernizing tradition places much greater emphases on reform and development, which is reflected in subsequent passages of the constitution that focus on health, education, and economic reforms. The Turkestan Declaration of Independence put political platform of the self-proclaimed Republic based on nine main principles:

1. End the Chinese dictatorial rule in the Land of Eastern Turkestan.
2. Establish a free and independent Eastern Turkestan Republic, based on equality of all nationalities.
3. In order to fully develop the economy of Eastern Turkestan, promote industry, agriculture and animal husbandry as well as private businesses. Increase people's living standards.
4. Since the majority of people of Eastern Turkestan believe in Islam, so the Government particularly advocates this religion. At the same time it promotes religious freedom for other religions.
5. Develop education, culture and health standards in Eastern Turkestan.
6. Establish friendly relations with all democratic countries in the World and neighboring countries, especially with the United Kingdom, Soviet Russia, Turkey and China.
7. In order to protect peace in Eastern Turkestan, recruit people of all nationalities to establish a strong Army.
8. The Bank, Post Service, Telephone and Telegraph, Forestry and all underground wealth belong to the nation.
9. Eliminate individualism, bureaucracy idea, nationalism and corruption among Government officials.

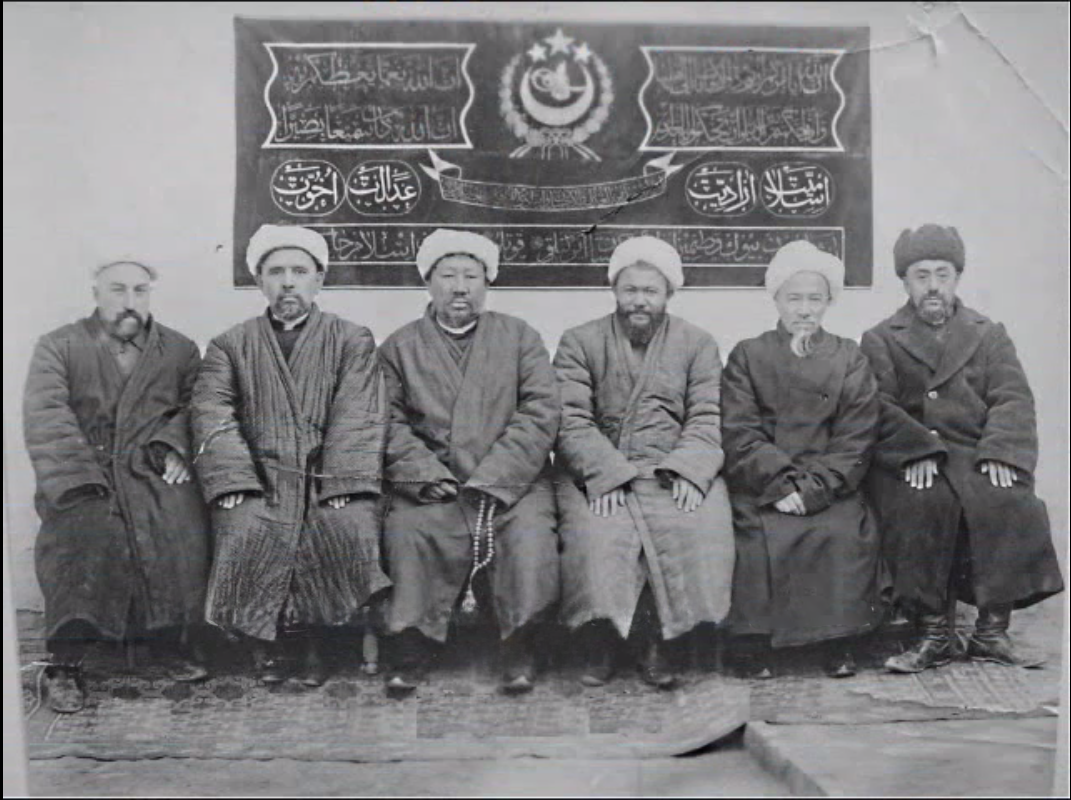
TIRET leaders

The Republic included the participation of Mahmut Muhiti, Yunus Beg and Maqsud Muhiti, a Jadidist. Shams al-Din Damulla was the Waqf affairs Minister while Agriculture Minister was Abuhasan, and Sabit Damolla was Prime Minister. Muhammad Amin Bughra, Shemsiddin Damolla, Abdukerimhan Mehsum, Sabit Damolla, and Abdulqadir Damolla were all Jadists who took part in the First East Turkestan Republic.

=== Efforts to gain recognition ===
After declaring independence, the TIRET tried to receive international recognition, dispatching of numerous envoys by Prime Minister Sabit Damolla to the Soviet Union (Tashkent, Moscow), Afghanistan, Iran, Turkey and the British Raj, though these efforts ultimately failed, with the countries refusing to recognize the envoys as representatives of an independent country.

British Consul-General in Kashgar J.W. Thomson-Glover was initially enthusiastic in his response to Sabit and Amirs and reported to New Delhi that "should any lasting unity between the Amirs and Khoja Niyas Hajji emerge, then with nominal allegiance to Nanking it might be possible for a friendly power to extend practical sympathy and help to the new and struggling Republic". However, the British Government in India replied to Thomson-Glover, reminding him that the British authorities recognized the Nanjing government as the sole authority in Xinjiang and that all moves to counter the Soviet Union in the province should be based on a policy to support the Chinese authorities. The TIRET envoys who reached New Delhi in February 1934 were also rebuffed, with The Times commenting that Delhi recognized Xinjiang as a province of China.

In January 1934 in Kabul, representatives met the newly proclaimed King of Afghanistan Mohammad Zahir Shah, who viewed the rebellion with sympathy and had sent congratulations on the establishment of the TIRET in November 1933, and Prime Minister Mohammad Hashim Khan, asking for aid and a supply of arms. However, the Soviet Union, which viewed the TIRET with distaste due to its anti-communism, put pressure on Afghanistan to not send aid. In Turkey the reports of developments in Xinjiang were initially greeted by the press with support; however, no material support was ever announced.

=== Christians and Hindus ===
Hostility to Christianity was espoused by the Committee for National Revolution. The Bughras applied Shari'a while ejecting the Khotan-based Swedish missionaries. They demanded the withdrawal of the Swedish missionaries while enacting Shariah on 16 March 1933. In the name of Islam, the Uyghur leader Amir Abdullah Bughra violently physically assaulted the Yarkand-based Swedish missionaries and would have executed them all, but they ended up only being banished thanks to the British interceding in their favor. There were beheadings and executions of Christians who had converted from Islam to Christianity at the hands of the Amir's followers. The missionaries faced hostility from Muhammad Amin Bughra.

There were several hundred Uyghur Muslims converted to Christianity by the Swedes. The Swedish Mission Society ran a printing operation. Life of East Turkestan was the state run media of the East Turkestan Republic. The Abdulbaqi lead government used the Swedish Mission Press to print and distribute the media. The Turkic Islamic Republic of East Turkestan's constitution mandated Islam as the official religion of the Republic, while guaranteeing religious freedom for all people.

The safety of the usurers and merchants of Hindu background from India were guaranteed by the British Consul-General. Russian refugees, missionaries, and Indian Hindu merchants and usurers were potential targets of gangs of Kashgaris so the Consulate-General of Britain was a potential shelter. Killings of 2 Hindus at the hands of Uighurs took place in Shamba Bazaar. They broke their feet, hands, teeth, stabbed their eyes, cut their tongues and ears. Plundering of the valuables of slaughtered Indian Hindus happened in Posgam on 25 March and on the previous day in Karghalik at the hands of Uighurs. Killings of Hindus took place in Khotan at the hands of the Bughra Amirs. Antagonism against the Hindus ran high among the Muslim Turki Uyghur rebels in Xinjiang's southern area. Muslims plundered the possessions in Karghalik of Rai Sahib Dip Chand, who was the aksakal of Britain, and his fellow Hindus on 24 March 1933, and in Keryia they slaughtered Indian Hindus. Sind's Shikarpur district was the origin of the Hindu diaspora there. The slaughter of the Hindus from India was called the "Karghalik Outrage". The Muslims had killed 9 of them. The forced removal of the Swedes was accompanied by slaughter of the Hindus in Khotan by the Islamic Turkic rebels. The Emirs of Khotan slaughtered the Hindus as they forced the Swedes out and declared Shariah in Khotan on 16 March 1933.

=== National army ===
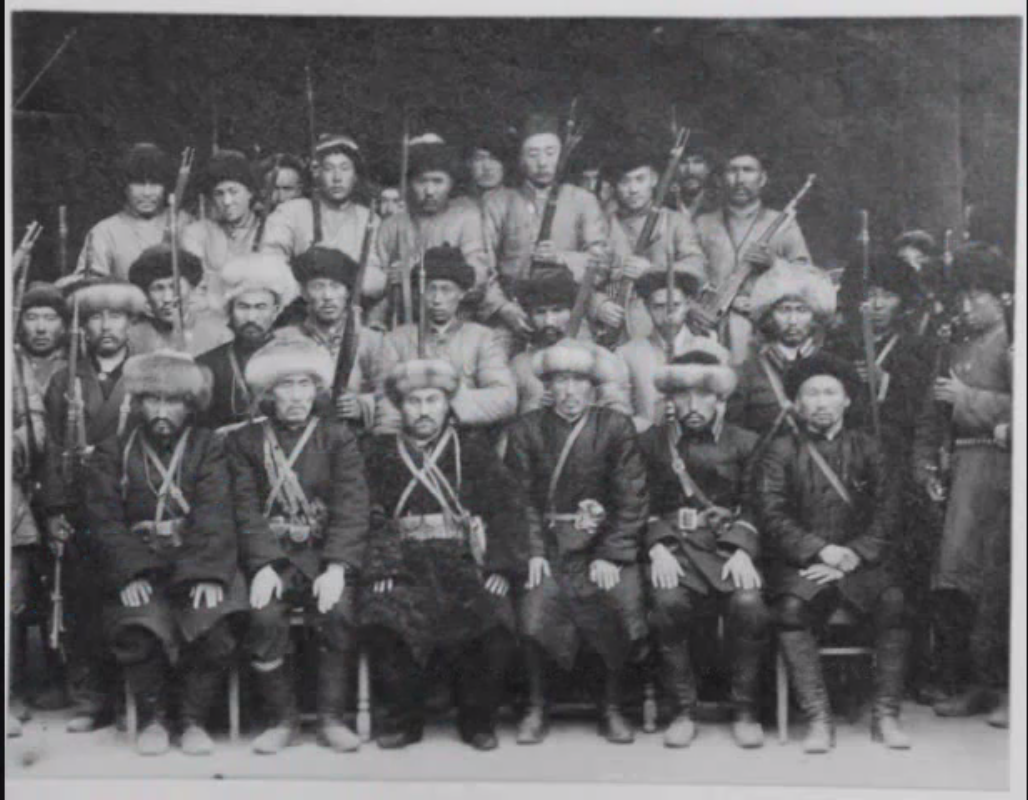
Army officers of the TIRET

The National Army of the Islamic Republic East Turkestan Republic was formed on 12 November 1933, and originally consisted of two divisions (around 22,000 troops), the Kashgar infantry division (stationed in the capital, Kashgar), and the Khotan Infantry Division (stationed in Khotan). The National Army was poorly armed and trained in the beginning of the Revolution, so a military academy was set up in Atush (Artush) to train cadets. All Turkic ethnic groups were called to take up arms and join the National Army. The military was headed by the Defense Minister Mahmut Muhiti (a Uyghur revolutionary from Turpan). Although the true size of the National Army is not known, it is estimated at 40,000 to 60,000 according to official Soviet sources.

1. Kashgar infantry division
2. Khotan infantry division
3. Aksu cavalry brigade
4. Kumul revolutionary regiment (later became a division)
5. Turpan revolutionary brigade (later became the Turpan Division)
6. Altay revolutionary cavalry brigade

During the war, an estimated 300,000 to 500,000 Turki civilians were killed. Although it is not certain how many soldiers the IRET lost in the war, it is estimated that around 50,000 to 70,000 soldiers were killed. In some battles, entire companies and brigades were wiped out. When IRET was dismantled in 1934, the army was dismantled also (except for 6th Uyghur Division personally commanded by Mahmut Muhiti).

== Dissolution ==
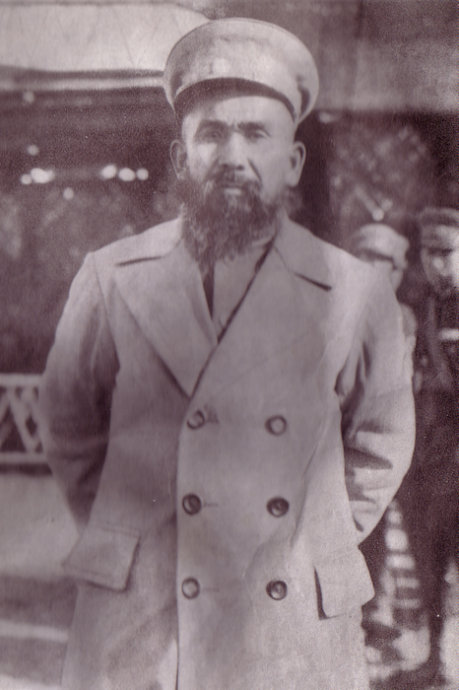
Khoja Niyaz served as the president of the short-lived republic

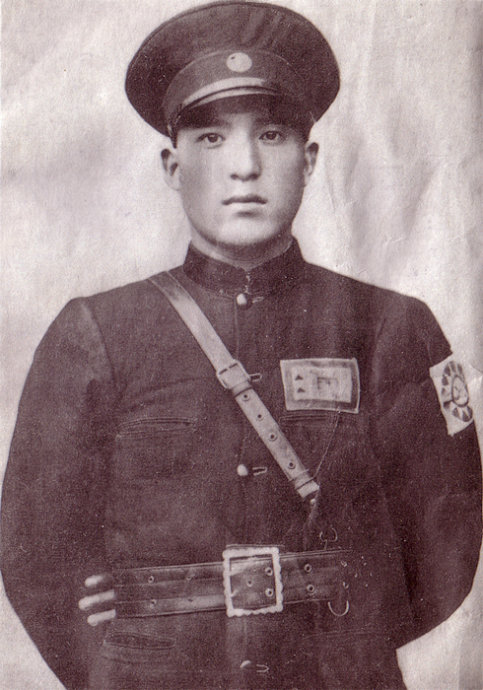
General Ma Zhongying (1910–1937?), Commander of 36th KMT Division (1933–1934)

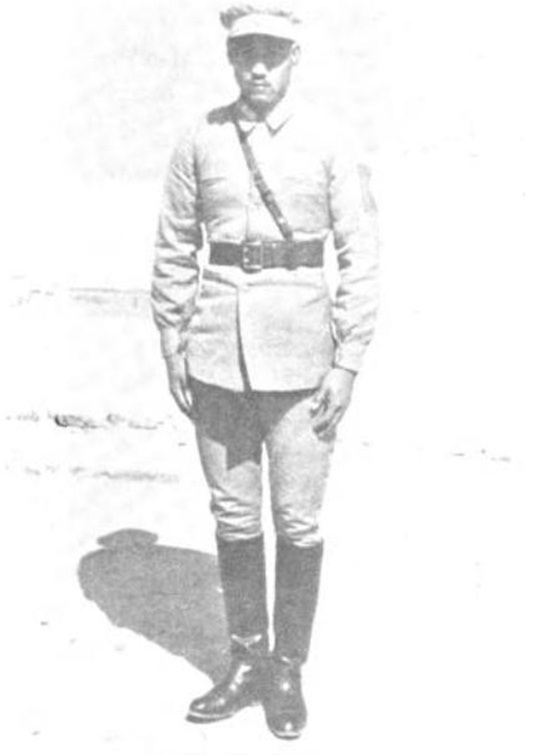
General Ma Hushan (1910–1954), Commander of 36th KMT Division (1934–1937)

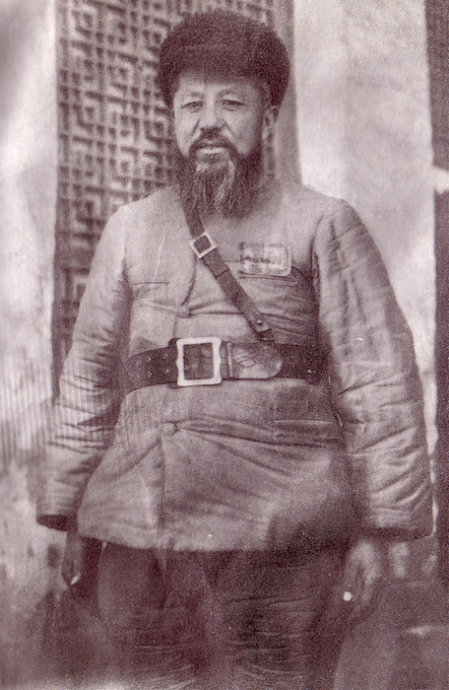
General Yulbars Khan (1889–1971), Chancellor of Kumul Khanate (1922–1930), Chief of Procurement Department of 36th KMT Division (1933–1934), Commissioner for Reconstruction Affairs of Xinjiang Provincial Government (1934–1937)

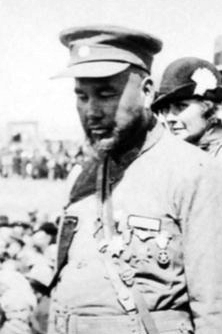
General Mahmut Muhiti was briefly the Minister of Defense of the TIRET

In the north, aid came to Sheng Shicai's forces on 24 January 1934, in the form of two Soviet brigades, the Altaiskaya and Tarbaghataiskaya, disguised as "White Russian Cossack Altai Volunteer Army" and led by Red Army General Pavel Rybalko in the Soviet invasion of Xinjiang. The Japanese annexation of Manchuria and rumored support for Ma Zhongying's Hui forces were one cause for concern troubling Joseph Stalin, another was the prospect that rebellion in Xinjiang might spread to the Soviet Republics in Central Asia and offer a haven to Turkic Muslim Basmachi rebels. Trade ties between Xinjiang and the Soviet Union also gave the Soviets reason for supporting Sheng. Newly appointed Soviet Consul-General in Ürümqi Garegin Apresov openly said to Sheng Shicai in May 1933: "You can develop the province and improve living conditions of the people of different nationalities, develop their culture. But if you let them [Muslim rebels] to create an Independent State in the South of the province, converting it into the Second Manchuria at the back door of the USSR, we will not be just a side watchers, we will start to act." First request from Sheng Shicai of military support from the Soviet Union came in October 1933. In December 1933, Sheng Shicai arrested White Russian Colonel Pavel Pappengut, who was staunchy anti-Soviet, and executed by demand of Apresov, replacing him by "neutral" General Bekteyev as Commander-in chief of three White Russian Regiments of Xinjiang Provincial Army, thus paving the way for a Soviet invasion.

Zhang Peiyuan, a Han Chinese General, who commanded Han Chinese troops in Ili, conducted negotiations with Ma Zhongying and planned to join him on the attack on Ürümqi in January 1934. Initially Zhang seized the road between Tacheng and Ürümqi, but decided to return to Ghulja after receiving of message of capturing the city by Russian "Altai Volunteer Army", Soviet troops entered the city. Upon approaching Ghulja he was surrounded on mountain road, his troops were partly annihilated, partly fled to Muzart Pass on Tian Shan Mountains and through it to Southern Xinjiang near Aksu. Zhang Peiyuan himself committed suicide. Ma Zhongying attacked Ürümqi as was planned, taking Sheng completely by surprise, stealthily approaching the city from the hills on the west and first capturing the telegraph station and aerodrome, then started besieging the city, completely isolating it from suburbs. But the fact, that in the crucial moment of besieging of Ürümqi Ma Zhongying didn't receive the promised help from Zhang Peiyuan's Ili Army, was the reason of Ma's failure to capture the city in the first weeks of attack; nevertheless, its fall was imminent and just a matter of time without intervention of Soviet troops. The battle for Ürümqi was decisive for the whole Ma Zhongying's campaign in Xinjiang and its taking by his forces would lead to recognision of him "the absolute ruler of Xinjiang" by the Nanjing Government of China, as was previously secretly promised to him.

The Soviet brigades, with air support, scattered Ma Zhongying's troops surrounding Ürümqi and forced them to retreat southward. On 16 February 1934, the siege of Ürümqi was lifted, freeing Sheng, his Manchurian and the White Guard Russian Cossack troops, which had been trapped in the city by Ma forces since 13 January 1934.

Khoja Niyaz had by this time arrived at Kashgar with 1,500 troops on the same day of 13 January 1934, to assume the presidency of the TIRET, going against his previous deal with Sheng. With him arrived another prominent Uyghur leader Mahmut Muhiti from eastern Xinjiang (Turpan, Kumul) who had agreed to become Minister of Defense in the TIRET Government, accepting the offer of Prime Minister Sabit Damolla. Sabit Damolla freed for Khoja Niyaz his own Palace in the old city of Kashgar, that was established in the former Yamen or residence of the head of Chinese administration of Southern Xinjiang, and asked to form a new Government. In his letter to Nanjing government Government, Khoja Niyaz explained his decision by emphasizing the fact, that he accepted the decision made by the Congress of People of Eastern Turkestan in accordance with its free will and choice and that Constitution of Chinese Republic of 1912 reserves the "right of five races of China to self-determination". He listed five principles of the self-ruling of the Republic:

1. All of Xinjiang is part of the Eastern Turkestan Republic, while all, that do not belong, should go back to where they came from;
2. The Government and economics will be conducted by the local people;
3. All the oppressed people, now living in Eastern Turkestan, will have freedom to pursue education, commerce and to build a new nation;
4. The President of the Republic, Khoja Niyaz, will build a Government dedicated to the happiness of the people;
5. The Republic with its various departments will strive to catch up with other modernizing societies.

Khoja Niyaz introduced a new flag for the republic, the Kök Bayraq, which resembled the Turkish flag but with a blue background instead of red. The old flag, a white field with a blue crescent and star and Shahada, became an alternate flag.

Nevertheless, the TIRET proved to be short-lived. The Hui forces retreating from the north linked up with Ma Zhancang's forces in Kashgar allied themselves with the Kuomintang in Nanjing, and attacked the TIRET, forcing Niyaz, Sabit Damolla, and the rest of the government to flee on 6 February 1934, to Yengi Hissar south of the city. The conquering Hui army killed many of those who remained, and a rapid procession of betrayals among the survivors, following their expulsion from Kashgar, spelled the effective end of the TIRET. The Hui army crushed the Uyghur and Kyrgyz armies of the East Turkestan Republic at the battle of Kashgar, battle of Yarkand, and battle of Yangi Hissar. Ma Zhongying effectively destroyed TIRET.

Following the Tungan capture of Kashgar, the remainders of the TIRET leadership including Prime Minister Sabit Damolla and Nur Ahmadjan retreated to Yengi Hissar to reorganize. Mahmut Muhiti retreated with remainder of Army to Yarkand and Hotan, while Khoja Niyaz fled through Artush to Erkeshtam on the Soviet border, with Tungan troops on his heels, which chased him as far as the border. Niyaz took refuge in the Soviet Union, where he was blamed by the Soviets for accepting from Sabit Damolla the position of first leader of TIRET (President), but was promised a military aid and "great prospects for the future" if he would help Sheng Shicai and the Soviets "to dissolve TIRET". Reportedly. Niyaz signed an agreement with the Soviets to dissolve the TIRET and place its authorities under the disposal of the provincial authorities. Niyaz became the "Civil Governor for Life" of Xinjiang province in exchange.

In the city of Yengi Hissar on 1 March 1934, TIRET cabinet and Sabit Damolla received notice that Niyaz and the Soviets reached an agreement; on 2 March, the cabinet held a special meeting, rejecting the agreement and condemning the President as a "national traitor". Damolla said on the meeting that "Hoja Niyaz is not a Champion of Islam any more, he turned himself into a tool in the hands of Russians to subdue our country". Upon hearing this decision, Niyaz marched from Erkeshtam to Yarkand, where he arrived in mid-April. He proceeded to collect all the gold he could find and withdrew, taking Sabit as his prisoner, going through Merket and Maral Bashi towards Aksu. Despite attempts to capture him by Tungan forces, Niyaz safely arrived in Aksu, where he turned over Sabit to the provincial authorities. Other TIRET officials fled to India and Afghanistan.

== Aftermath ==
The Kuomintang-allied Hui forces under Ma Zhongying were defeated, and Sheng consolidated his rule over northern Xinjiang with Soviet backing. The seat of Khoja Niyaz Southern Xinjiang Autonomous Government was initially located in Aksu, but later he was urged by Sheng Shicai to move to Ürümqi to assume the position of the Vice Chairman of the Xinjiang Government. His forces received 15,000 rifles and ammunitions from the Soviet Union, but each rifle, each bullet, and each bomb, that was dropped on Tungan troops from Soviet airplanes, had been bought in gold from the Soviet Union by Khoja Niyaz.

By the end of 1934, Sheng Shicai, with Soviet backing, was firmly in control of Xinjiang. With Soviet mediation, Khoja Niyaz agreed to serve as the vice chairman of the Xinjiang Government led by Sheng. Sheng appointed Mahmut Muhiti as the deputy military commander of the Kashgar region, and permitted Yulbars Khan, one of the Hami rebel leaders, to serve as the head of Hami County. Ma Zhongying was persuaded to study in the Soviet Union, where he disappeared. His subordinate forces in southern Xinjiang were eventually absorbed by Sheng Shicai. Muhammad Amin Bughra fled to Afghanistan where he sought Japanese support for the TIRET.

Interviews with Turkestani veterans in exile suggest that Sheng Shicai and the Soviets collaborated to crush the Republic. Russia had a two-sided policy in relation to the region of East Turkestan; often promising aid (in 1933 and 1944), but placing its own political and economic interests above everything else. The Soviet Union did not offer any military equipment despite being paid for it by a delegation of the Republic.

== Government ==
=== Cabinet ===
Ministers Transcaucasian Democratic Federative Republic
Portfolio	Minister
President	Khoja Niyaz
Prime Minister	Sabit Damolla
Minister of Foreign Affairs	Muhammad Qasim Jan
Minister of Justice	Sharif Qari
Minister of Interior	Yunus Beg
Minister of Health	Abdullah Khan
Minister of Defense	Mahmut Muhiti
Minister of Education	Abd al-Karim Khan Makhdum
Minister of Finance	Ali Akhund Bay
Minister of Religious Institutions	Shams al-Din Turdi
Minister of Trade and Commerce	Sadiq Beg
Emir of Khotan	Nur Ahmadjan Bughra
Minister of Communications	Abdullah Damullah
President of the National Assembly	Tahir Beg
Secretary of the National Assembly	Sufi Zada

== Gallery ==
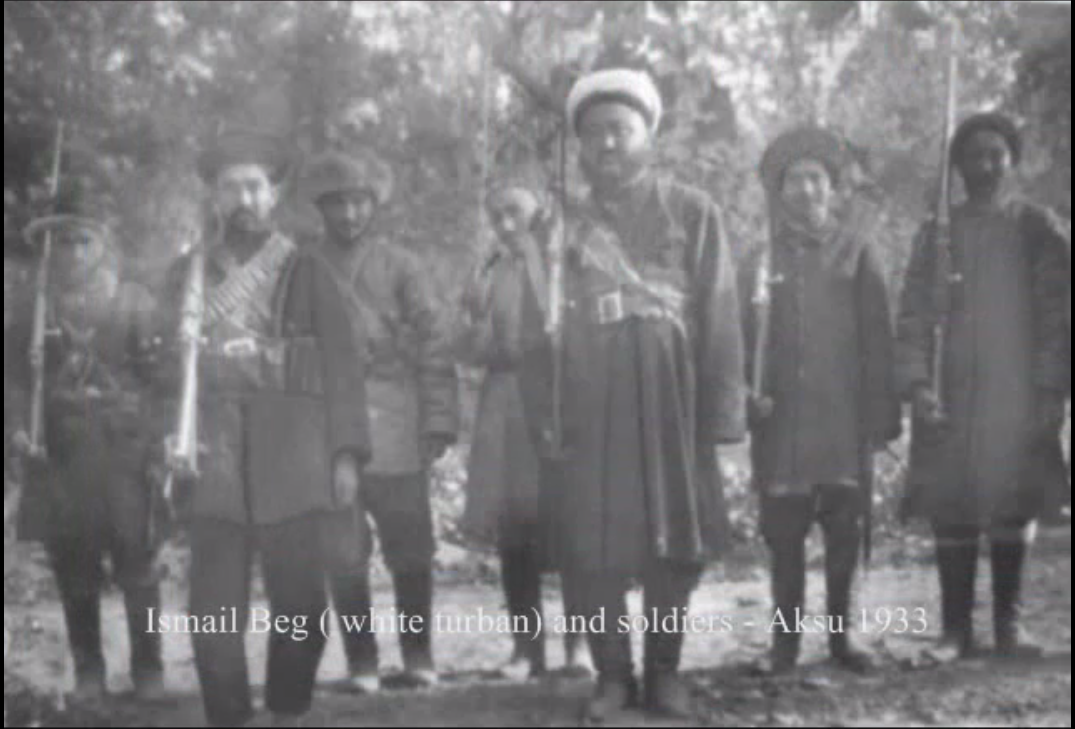
Ismail Beg before the Battle of Aksu

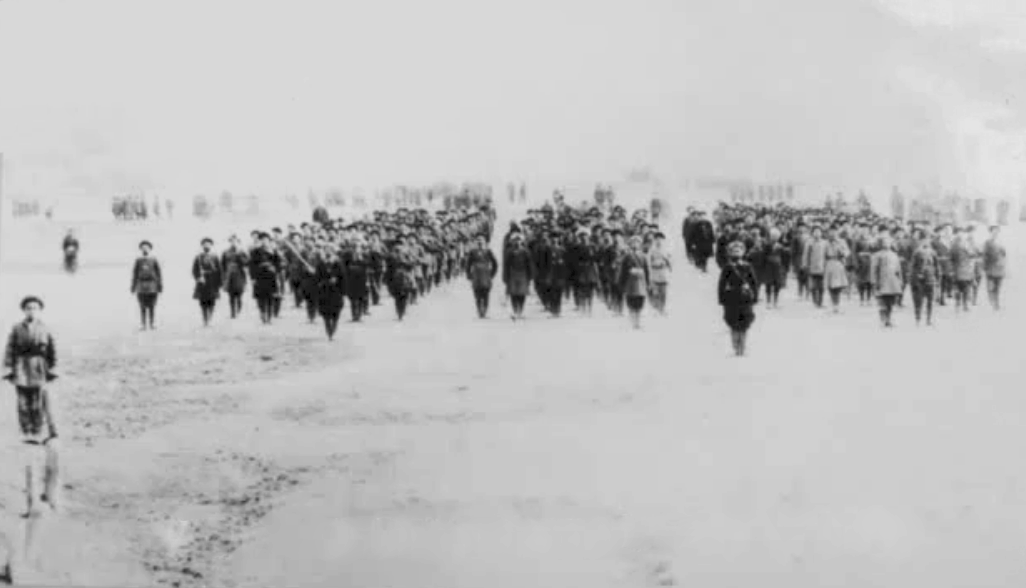
Uyghur reinforcements from Khotan marching to Kashgar

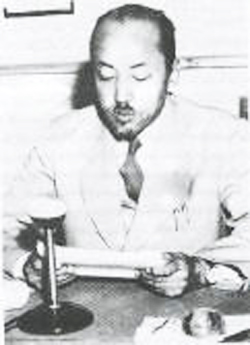
Muhammad Amin Bughra (1901–1965), Emir of the Khotan Emirate (1933–1934), Vice Chairman of KMT Xinjiang Government (1948–1949)

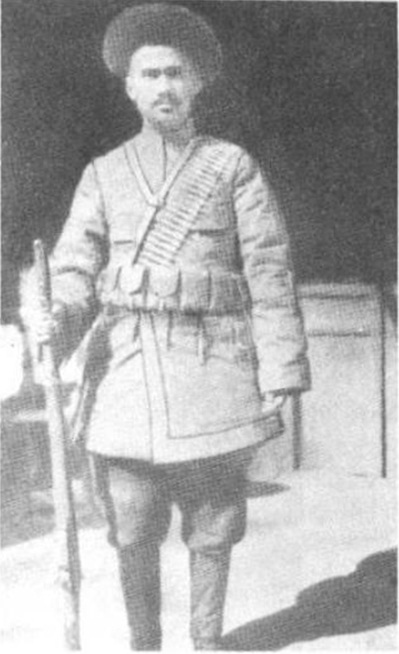
Khotan Emir Nur Ahmadjan Bughra (1933–1934)

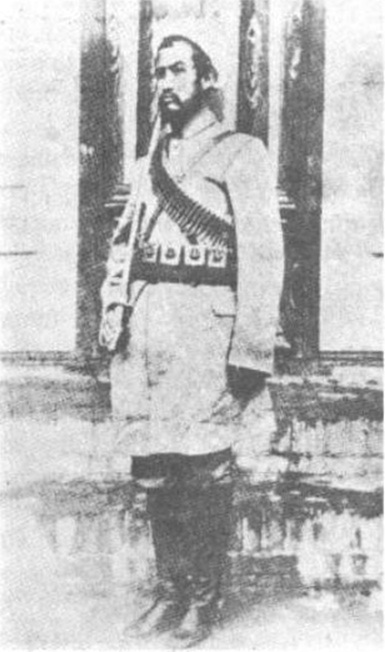
Khotan Amir Abdullah Bughra (1933–1934)

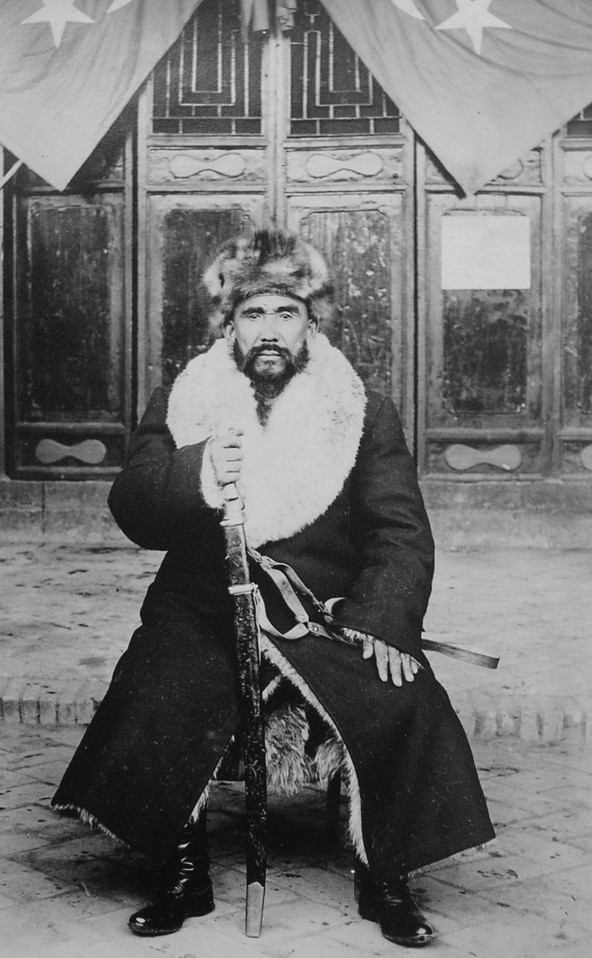
Khoja Niyaz as the president

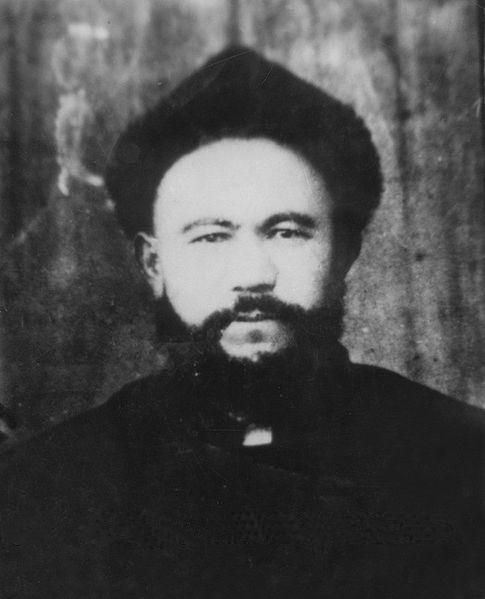
Sabit Damolla, Prime Minister
