= Hami Depression =

Basin in Xinjiang, China

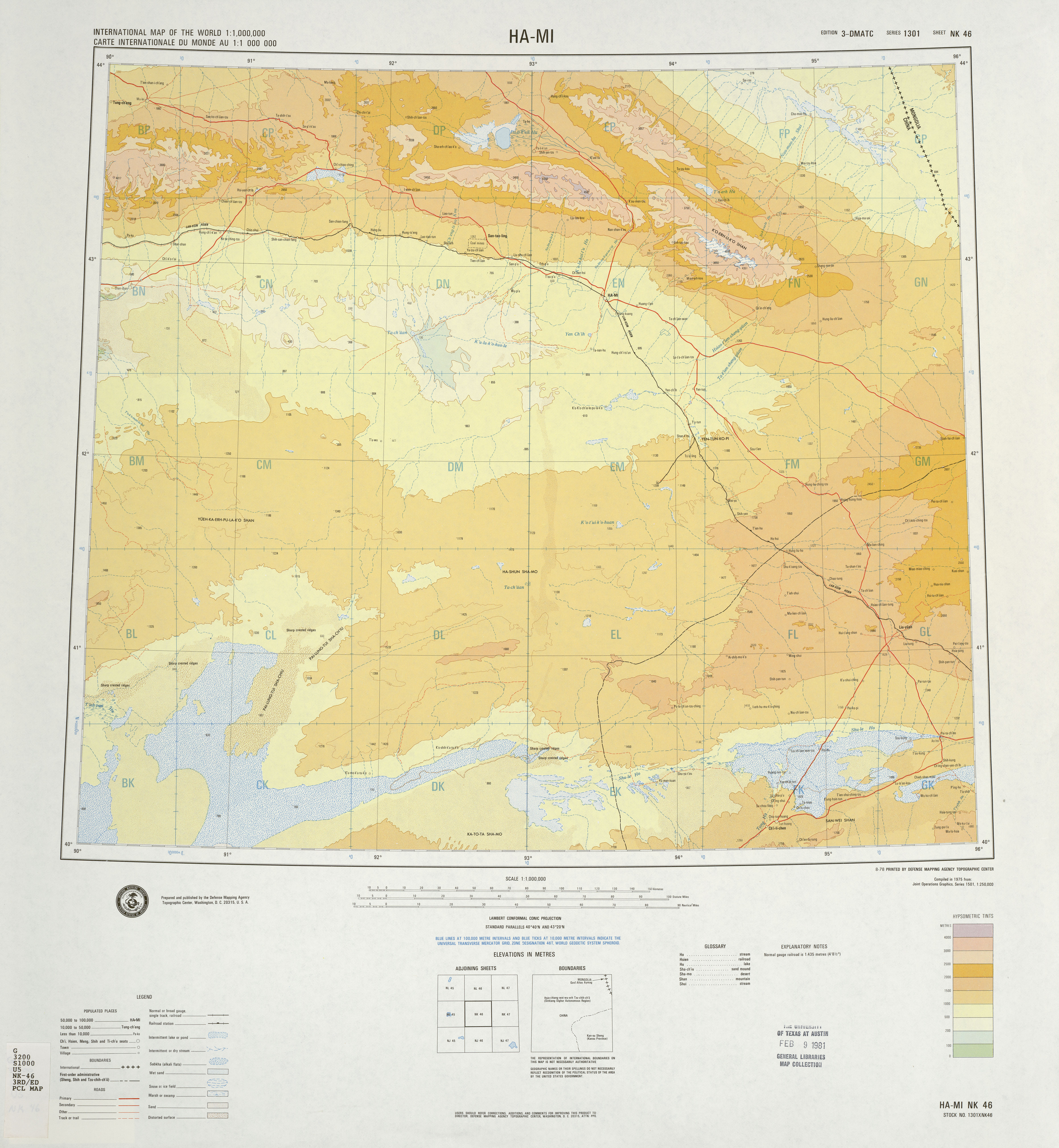
Hypsometric map of the Ha-mi Region

The Kumul Depression, also known as the Hami Depression, (Chinese: 哈密盆地), is a basin in eastern Xinjiang, China. It is located in the south of the Kumul Prefecture, on the south slope of the Tian Shan, with an area of 53,500 square kilometres (20,700 sq mi). Its lowest point has an elevation of 53 metres (174 ft).

The climate of the area is considered to be arid, with large seasonal differences in temperature. The city of Kumul, also known as Hami, lies within the basin and is known for producing the Hami melon, grapes, and other fruit produce.

The basin has extensive oil resources.
