= Uyghur Americans =

Americans of Uyghur descent

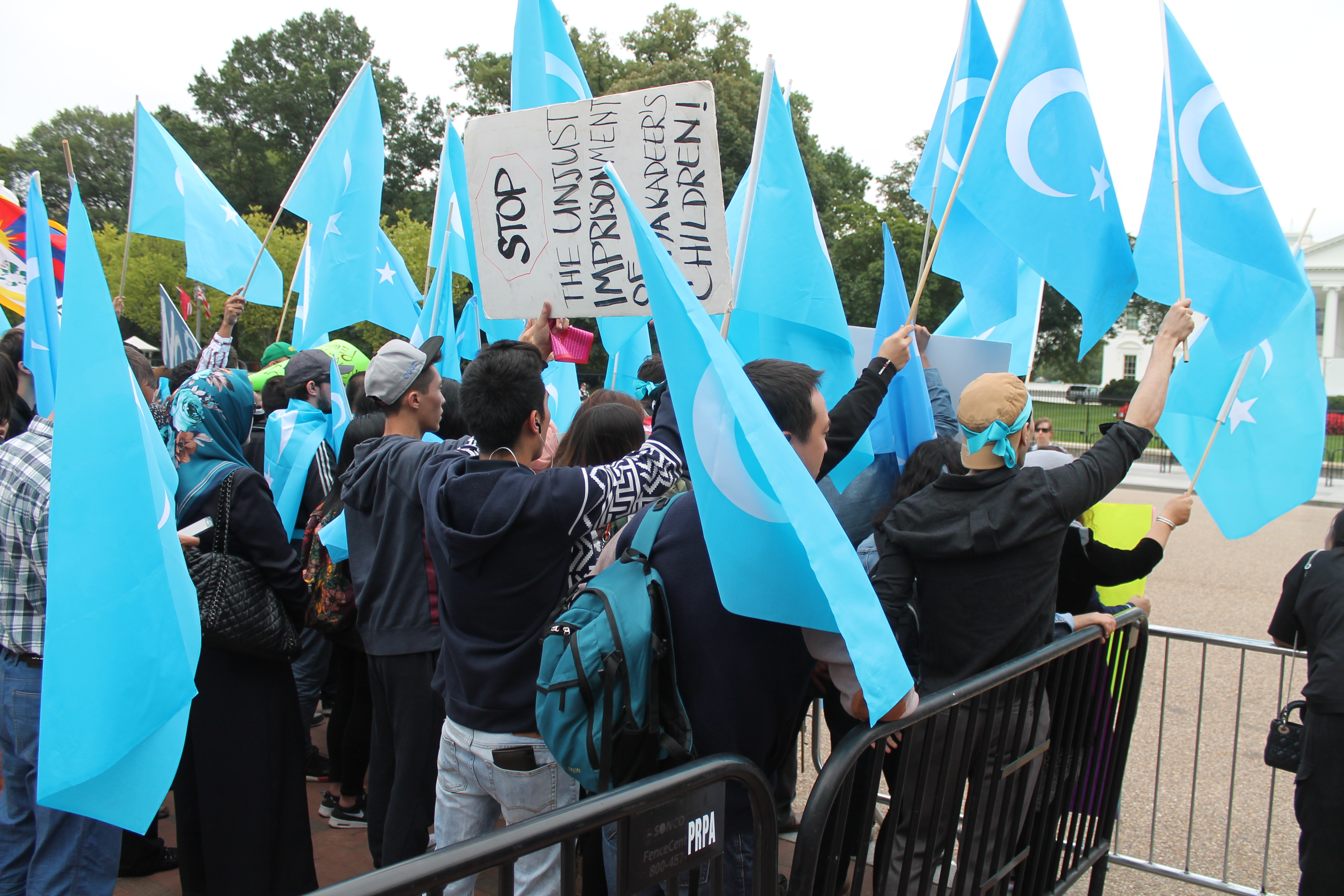
- Uyghur Americans protest in front of the White House against China's human rights violations (September 25, 2015)

Total population
- 8,905 (per U.S. Census Bureau- 2010) 30,000–80,000 (East Turkistan Government in Exile. 2021 estimates); 80,000–100,000 (Uyghur American Association. 2022 estimates).

Regions with significant populations
- Washington D.C., Fairfax, Virginia, Virginia Beach, Richmond, New York, Los Angeles, San Francisco, Boston, Austin, Houston

Languages
- Uyghur · Mandarin Chinese · American English

Religion
- Predominantly Sunni Islam

Related ethnic groups
- Uyghurs

Uyghur Americans (Uyghur: ئامېرىكىلىق ئۇيغۇرلار, romanized: Amérikiliq Uyghurlar) are Americans of Uyghur ethnicity. Most Uyghurs emigrated from Xinjiang, China, to the United States from the late 1980s onwards, with a significant number arriving after July 2009.

== History ==
Uyghurs' history in the United States dates back to the 1960s with the arrival of a small number of immigrants. In the late 20th century, after a series of Xinjiang conflicts, more millions of Uyghurs fled from Xinjiang to Kazakhstan, Turkey, Europe, Canada, Australia, New Zealand, and other countries and places.

A 2010 estimate put the Uyghur population in the United States at more than 8,000, however, the Uyghur American Association has said that more have moved to the United States in the 2010s because of the crackdown of July 2009 Ürümqi riots in China in July 2009. As of 2022, the Uyghur American Association estimates there are about 10,000 Uyghurs in the United States while the East Turkistan Government in Exile estimates there are between 10,000 and 15,000 Uyghurs in the United States.

In 2019, the Chinese government was reported to have harassed and abused Uyghurs in the United States, in an attempt to control the speech and actions of Uyghur-Americans.

== Organizations ==
As with other ethnic groups in the United States, Uyghur Americans also have several organizations. The most well-known organizations are:

- the Uyghur American Association, a Washington D.C.–based advocacy organization which was established in 1998 by a group of Uyghur overseas activists to raise the public awareness of the Uyghur people
- the East Turkistan National Awakening Movement, a youth led organization which was set up by Uyghur graduate student Salih Hudayar in 2017
- the East Turkistan Government in Exile, which was set up by Uyghur activist Anwar Yusuf Turani in 2004.

== Notable people ==
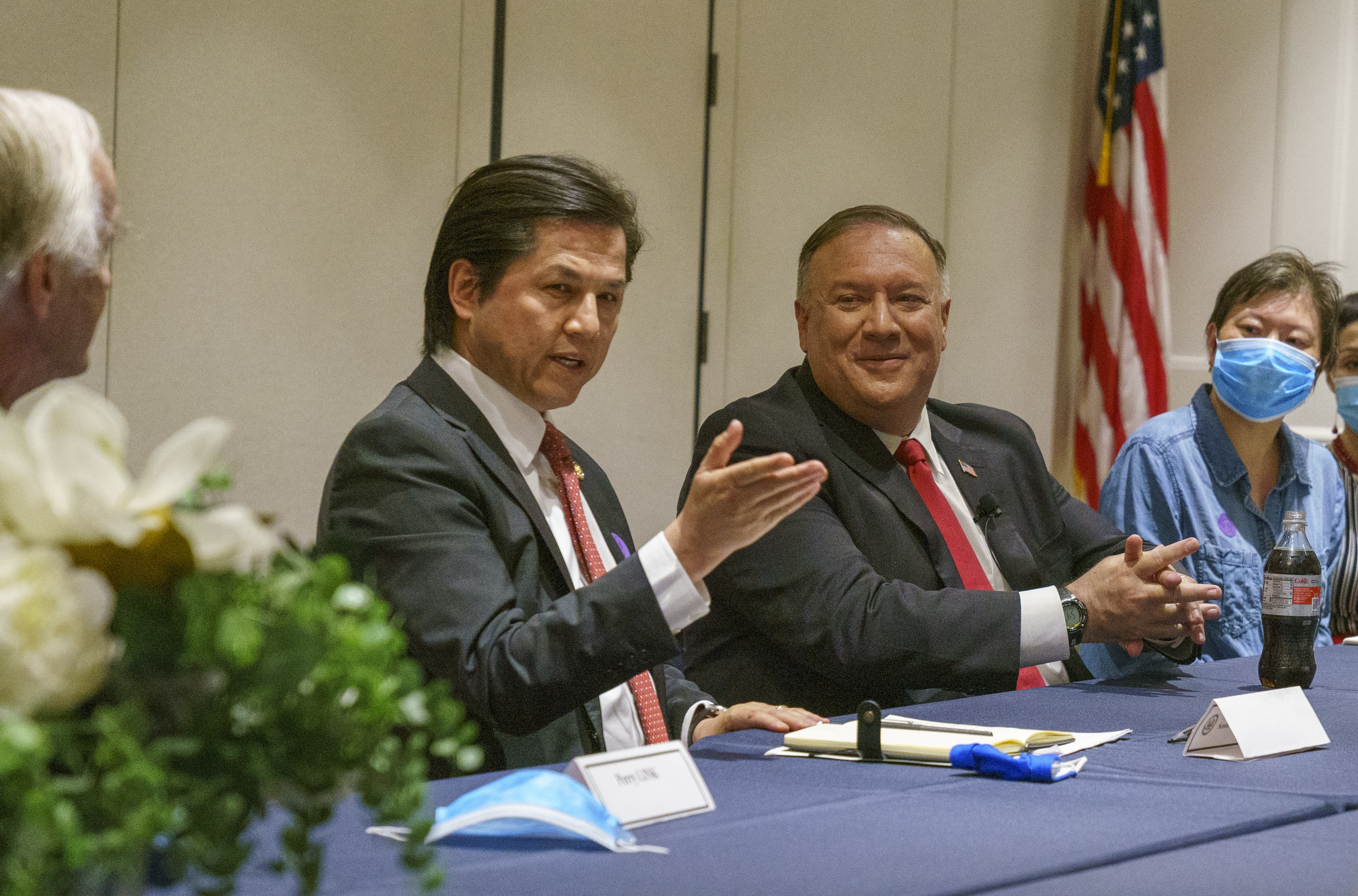
US Secretary of State Michael Pompeo meets with USCIRF Commissioner Nury Turkel and Chinese dissidents (July 2020).

- Rushan Abbas, activist and executive director of Campaign for Uyghurs
- Gulchehra Hoja, journalist with Radio Free Asia
- Shohret Hoshur, journalist with Radio Free Asia
- Salih Hudayar, current Foreign Minister of the East Turkistan Government-in-Exile
- Elnigar Iltebir, Director for China at the United States National Security Council
- Rebiya Kadeer, former President of the World Uyghur Congress (resident in the US)
- Gulimina Mahamuti, pianist
- Shoukhrat Mitalipov, stem cell researcher
- Anwar Yusuf Turani, political activist
- Nury Turkel, commissioner on the United States Commission on International Religious Freedom
- Mihrigul Tursun, former detainee in the Xinjiang re-education camps

== See also ==
- East Turkistan Government-in-Exile
- East Turkistan National Awakening Movement
- Uyghur American Association
- Uyghur Human Rights Project
- List of Uyghurs
