= Yaghma =

Yaghma may refer to:

- Yagma, a Turkish tribe which was part of the Kara-Khanid khanate confederation
- Heydar Yaghma, Iranian poet
- Ghulam Osman Yaghma, Uyghur president
