= Tahir Hamut Izgil =

Uyghur poet and film director

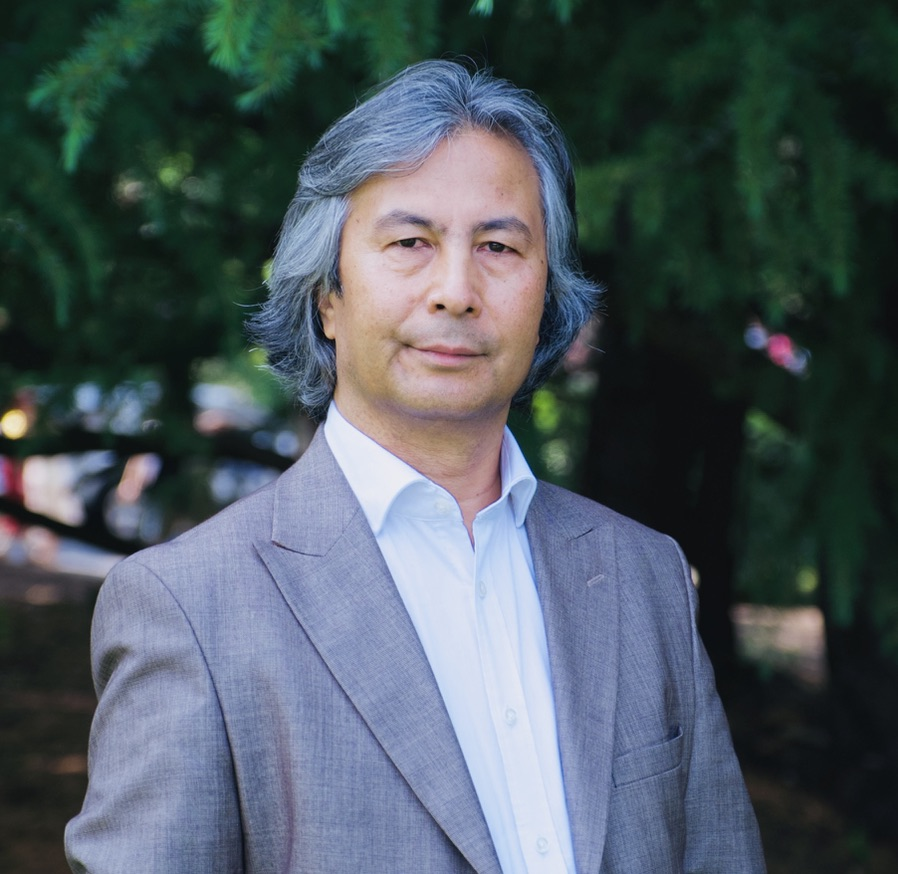
- Tahir Hamut Izgil in 2025
- Born: 1969 (age 56–57); Kashgar, Xinjiang
- Education: Minzu University of China
- Occupations: Poet, filmmaker, and author
- Spouse: Marhaba Izgil
- Children: 3
- Writing career
- Language: Uyghur
- Years active: 1990s-
- Genres: Poetry; literary criticism; films

Tahir Hamut Izgil (born 1969) is a modernist Uyghur poet, filmmaker, and author. A leader in avant-garde Uyghur poetry in the 1990s, he is known for poems and films strongly influenced by Uyghur life. Originally from Xinjiang, he is currently living in exile in the United States. His experiences as an intellectual during the rounding up of Uyghurs and his emigration to the west is described in his memoir Waiting to Be Arrested at Night, published in 2023.

== Early life ==
Izgil was born in a small town near Kashgar, Xinjiang and grew up in the city. He obtained a government scholarship to go to Minzu University of China, a university for national minorities in Beijing. Izgil was one of the first Uyghur poets to receive a fully bilingual education - in both Uyghur and Mandarin. When he arrived at college, he and his fellow students from Xinjiang, including now-noted poet Perhat Tursun, knew little Chinese. They quickly formed a study group and began reading Western philosophy, theory and criticism: existentialist philosophers, the European modernists, American Gothic fiction and critical theory. They also read contemporary Chinese literature: the Misty Poets and experimental Chinese fiction writers. Izgil was particularly drawn to modernist literary criticism, and became one of the premier Uyghur critics of Western modernism. He published his first poem in 1986.

== Poetry ==
Upon returning to the Uyghur region in the early 1990s, Tursun and Izgil started publishing their avant-garde poetry and attracted a following. They were among the first Uyghur poets to write in free verse, following in the footsteps of gungga (hazy/vague/uncertain) poets like Ahmatjan Osman. Free verse was a departure from traditional Uyghur lyric composition, which has a strong emphasis on syllabic metrical forms like aruz. Using this new form, they wrote openly about "sex, religion, and the ongoing cultural life of shamanism and superstition that tie Uyghurs to land and embodied ritual practice." Izgil in particular often wrote about his "attachments to the places he came from" such as Kashgar's "fierce local pride, its layout, its customs, and its slang". Many of his poems have been said to be "filled with longing and exhaustion, enchantment and release."

The group's work revealed the "uncertainty of their religiosity". While many opposed reformist Islam that arrived in the 1990s, they were drawn to Sufi poetics. For them, Sufi ideas and attitudes had the power to contest ethno-national conservatism, allowing them to reclaim Uyghur identity by being "true to their own personal sense of self" and affirming "a love of contemporary life itself." They also opposed "the close melding of life to [political] ideology, which was such a dominant feature of twentieth century Chinese cultural life." Both these features of their poetics were departures from that of canonical 20th century poets like Abdurehim Ötkür, the father of modern Uyghur poetry, who had written traditional lyrics with a Socialist Realist ethos.

Over time, Izgil's works grew to be "more complex on both a stylistic and an emotional level". The poems he wrote in his early life while in Beijing had had "unadorned style and syntax".

English translations of Izgil's poetry have appeared in The New York Review of Books, Asymptote, Berkeley Poetry Review, and other magazines. His poems have also been translated into Chinese, Japanese, Turkish, Swedish, French, and other languages.

Izgil has continued writing poetry after his exile. He states that his exile has disrupted his poetic practice - he feels that he doesn't have the same poetic inspiration and writes fewer poems.

Izgil was invited to give poetry reading nights at Indiana University in 2016, the University of Washington in 2018, and Yale University in 2020.

== Filmmaking ==
In 1998, he forayed into filmmaking and eventually directed a groundbreaking drama, The Moon Is a Witness. He founded a film production company named Izgil and made feature films, documentaries, music videos, and ad films. Since 2005, he has turned to filming narrative documentaries and lyric poetry. He filmed a selection of Kucha folk songs and compiled them into a single DVD called Mirajikhan. In the 2010s, he worked as one of the principal instructors in the Film Department of the Xinjiang Arts Institute in Ürümqi.

== Exile ==
In the mid-1990s, Izgil was detained in a labor camp for three years for carrying allegedly sensitive documents, including newspaper articles about Uyghur separatist attacks, on an attempted trip to study in Turkey. Later, he was blacklisted for jobs. In August 2017, as the Chinese government began its mass internment of Uyghurs, he fled with his family to northern Virginia, where he currently lives. He escaped under the guise of seeking treatment for his daughter's epilepsy. Soon after they arrived in the US, the two brothers of Marhaba, Izgil's wife, were sent to a re-education camp.

He was approached to speak about this flight by the Wall Street Journal, but hesitated out of concern for his family back home. In the end he and his wife decided to speak out, as "[couldn't] stay silent any more." After the article came out in December 2017, Izgil's younger brother Adil, who had worked with Izgil on his films, disappeared. Moreover, two of his female relatives in Xinjiang were interrogated because he "hadn’t gone back to China and [was] involved in separatist activities." His latest book of poems was ordered to be removed from bookshelves as well. His video testimony, recorded by The Wall Street Journal, was later used in the popular American news satire show Last Week Tonight.

Izgil says distrust among Uyghurs abroad, many of whom suspect others spy for Beijing, has greatly reduced attendance to his poetry readings in the US. He has applied for asylum, but his application has been pending for years, mostly due to the slowdown in asylum processing due to a policy change by the Trump administration.

After arriving in the US, he had a son in November 2019.

== Activism ==
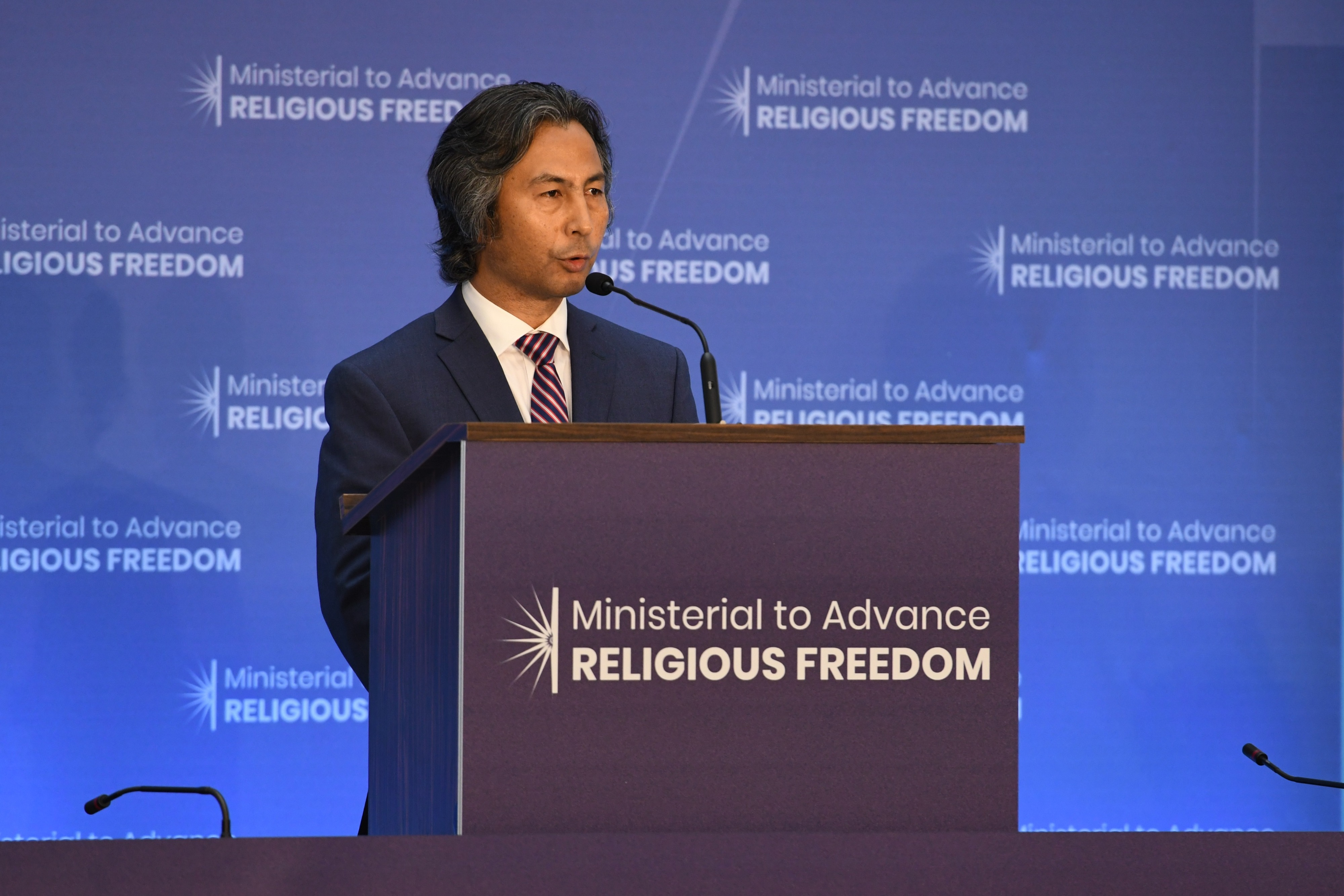
Hamut delivers remarks at the Ministerial to Advance Religious Freedom at the U.S. Department of State in Washington, D.C., on July 24, 2018.

Izgil has been active in speaking out against persecution against Uyghurs by the Chinese government. He gave a speech at US State Department’s "Ministerial to Advance Religious Freedom", an event focused on addressing religious persecution around the world. The event was attended by Vice-President Mike Pence and Secretary of State Mike Pompeo and resulted in the release of a "Statement of Concern" about religious persecution in China, among other countries.

He has also chosen to speak on the record to the Wall Street Journal, a prominent US newspaper, about his escape and exile, with great risk to his family back home.

In April 2018, the World Uyghur Writers’ Union was established in Istanbul by a group of 25 Uyghur writers. Tahir Hamut Izgil was chosen to be their leader.

Izgil is now a film producer at Radio Free Asia, which has been active in documenting China's persecution of the Uyghurs.

== Awards, honors and fellowships ==
- 2026–2027 Howard Foundation Fellowship for Poetry
- 2025 PEN Català Veu Lliure Prize (Free Voice Prize)
- 2024 Moore Prize for Human Rights Writing
- 2024 Václav Havel International Prize for Creative Dissent
- 2024 Cikada Prize for Poetry
- 2023 National Book Critics Circle John Leonard Prize for Waiting to Be Arrested at Night

== Selected bibliography ==
- Western Modernist Literary Thought (Written in Uyghur, 2000, Xinjiang People’s Publishing House)
- Distance and Other Poems (Poetry in Uyghur and English, translated by Joshua L. Freeman, Darren Byler and Dilmurat Mutellip from Uyghur, 2016, Nationals Audio and Video Publishing House, China, ISBN 9787887059901)
- Holy Ritual (Poetry in Japanese, translated by Muqeddes Nur from Uyghur, 2020, Komiyakushya Publishing House, Japan, ISBN 978-4860617561)
- Izgil, Tahir Hamut (2023). Waiting to Be Arrested at Night. Penguin Press. ISBN 978-0-593-49179-9

== Selected filmography ==
- The Moon Is a Witness (TV feature, 1999)
- Dark Mountain (TV feature, 2001)
- A Wistful Village Song (TV feature, 2003)
- Family Anecdotes (TV short, 2005)
- A Celebration of Hope: Nauroz Festival (Documentary short, 2011)
- An Old Passion, Meshrep (Documentary short, 2012)
- Qurban Eid in Photos (Documentary short, 2013)
- Kashgar Story (TV series, 2016)
