= Anwar Yusuf Turani =

Uyghur independence activist (born 1962)

- ئەنۋەر يۈسۈپ تۇرانى; Анвар Йусуф Турани
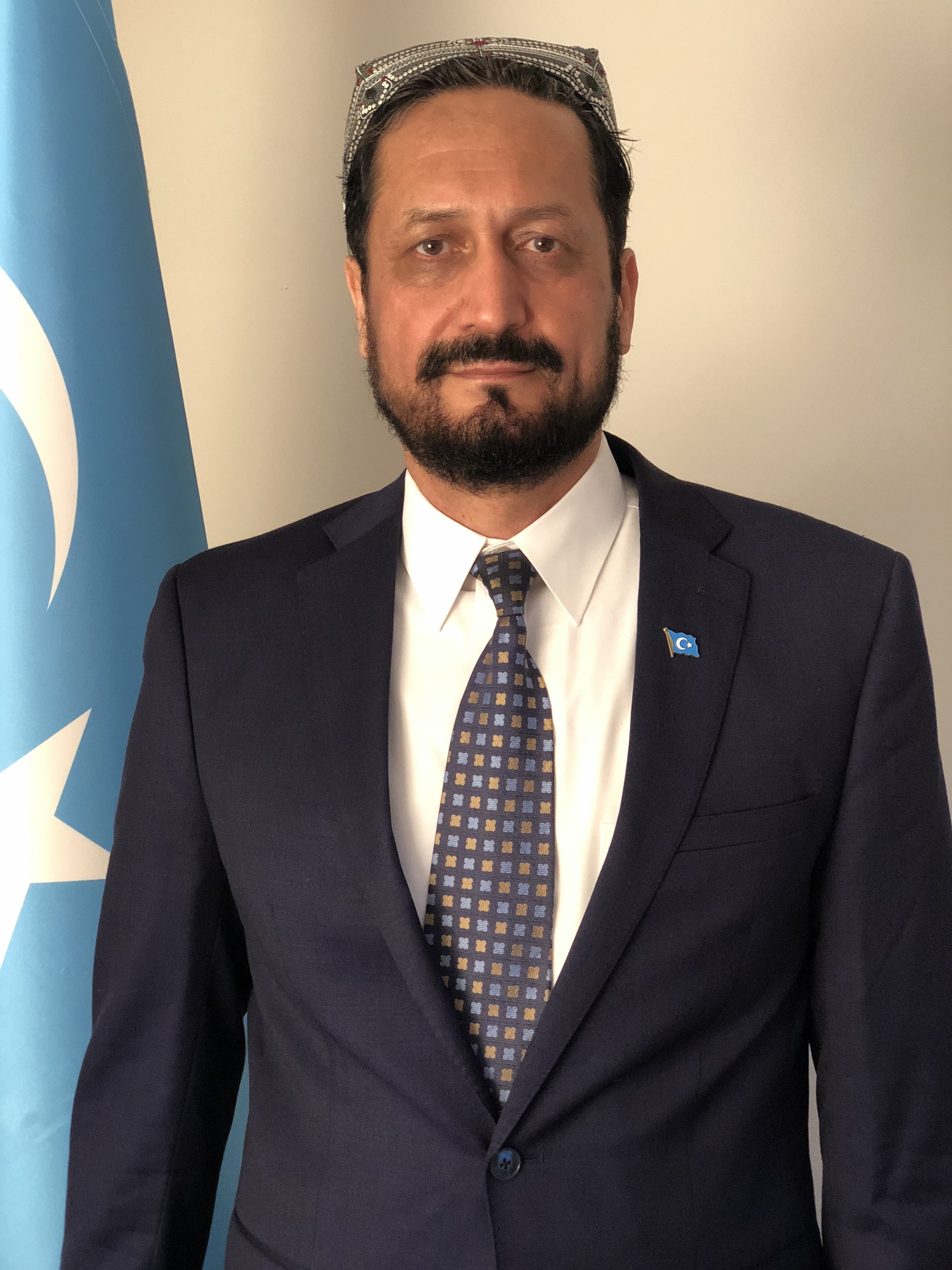
- Turani in 2021

Prime Minister of the East Turkistan Government-in-Exile
- In office 14 September 2004 – 2006
- Preceded by: Position established
- Succeeded by: Damiyan Rehmet

Personal details
- Born: August 3, 1962 (age 64) Artux, Xinjiang, China
- Occupation: Activist, musician, teacher
- Known for: founding the East Turkistan National Freedom Center and East Turkistan Government in Exile
- Website: https://etnfc.us/

Anwar Yusuf Turani (Uyghur: ئەنۋەر يۈسۈپ تۇرانى, Анвар Йусуф Турани) is an ethnic Uyghur nationalist and self proclaimed separatist leader. Born into a family branded counter-revolutionary by the Chinese government, Turani was raised in a labor camp where he faced economic hardship and political oppression. He attended Kashgar Teacher's College and graduated from the Department of Physics in July 1983. Turani came to the United States on August 12, 1988, and became the first Uyghur political asylee. In 1995, he established the East Turkistan National Freedom Center (ETNFC), a non-profit human rights organization based in Washington, D.C. He is the first person to start the East Turkistan independence movement in the United States. Having spearheaded the formation of the East Turkistan Government in Exile (ETGE) on September 14, 2004, in Washington, D.C., Turani went on to become the first Prime Minister of the entity.

== Activism ==
=== East Turkistan National Freedom Center ===
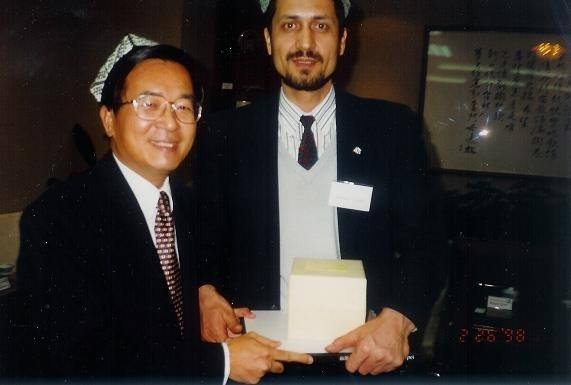
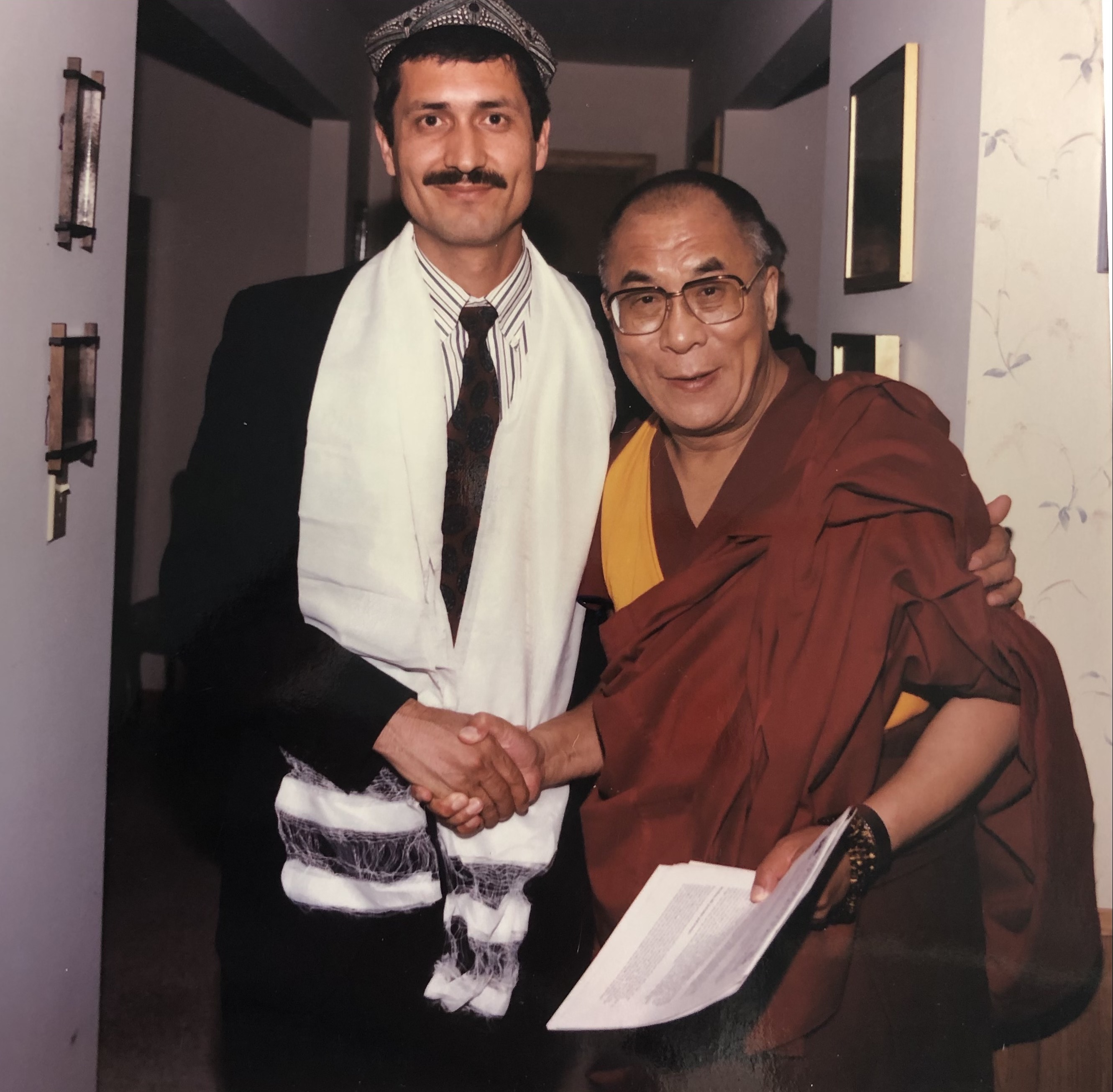
Turani with Chen Shui-bian (left) and the 14th Dalai Lama (right)

Turani established the East Turkistan National Freedom Center a professional political organization in Washington, DC in 1996 to advocate independence for his homeland. He served as president of the organization until 2004. Turani organized demonstrations, conferences and cultural events concerning the situation of East Turkistan. He also met with many international dignitaries, including U.S. President Bill Clinton, the Dalai Lama and Taiwanese President Chen Shui-bian, in an attempt to gain their support in ending the occupation of his nation.

In April 1996, Turani met with Tenzin Gyatso, the 14th Dalai Lama, forging an alliance between East Turkistan and Tibet against the Chinese government. Later that month, Turani and representatives of occupied Tibet and Inner Mongolia organized an Independence Walk from the Chinese embassy in Washington, D.C. to the United Nations in New York City. At the end of the two-week walk, Turani spoke in front of the United Nations headquarters, addressing Chinese human rights violations in East Turkistan since 1949.

In June 1997, with the support of the Tibetan Independence Movement, Turani cut one of the five stars from the national flag of China in front of the United Nations. Turani removed the star as a symbolic gesture of his desire for separation of Xinjiang from China.

In February 1998, Turani visited Taiwan at the invitation of the World Federation of Taiwanese Associations, along with Erkin Alptekin; Professor Thubten Jigme Norbu, elder brother of the Dalai Lama; Tashi Jamyangling, former Home Secretary of the Tibetan Government in exile; and Johnar Bache, Vice Chairman of the Southern Mongolian People's Party. They met Taiwan independence activists and the pro-Taiwan independence Democratic Progressive Party members Liu Sung-pan, the President of Taiwan's Legislative Yuan; Chen Shui-bian, former president of Taiwan; and Frank Hsieh, the Mayor of Kaohsiung.

On June 4, 1999, Turani met with US President Bill Clinton to seek his backing for the East Turkistan independence movement. Turani told Clinton that he favored waging a war of independence against China. He claimed to have been funded by wealthy Uyghurs in Saudi Arabia.

On July 20, 2001, Turani received a letter from the United States Department of State on behalf of President George W. Bush, in response to Turani's initial letter concerning the Chinese occupation of East Turkistan. The letter expressed the U.S. government's willingness to protect the "fundamental human rights -- the rights to freedom of association, assembly, religion, belief, conscience, and expression -- of Uyghurs and others living in China."

=== East Turkistan Government in Exile ===
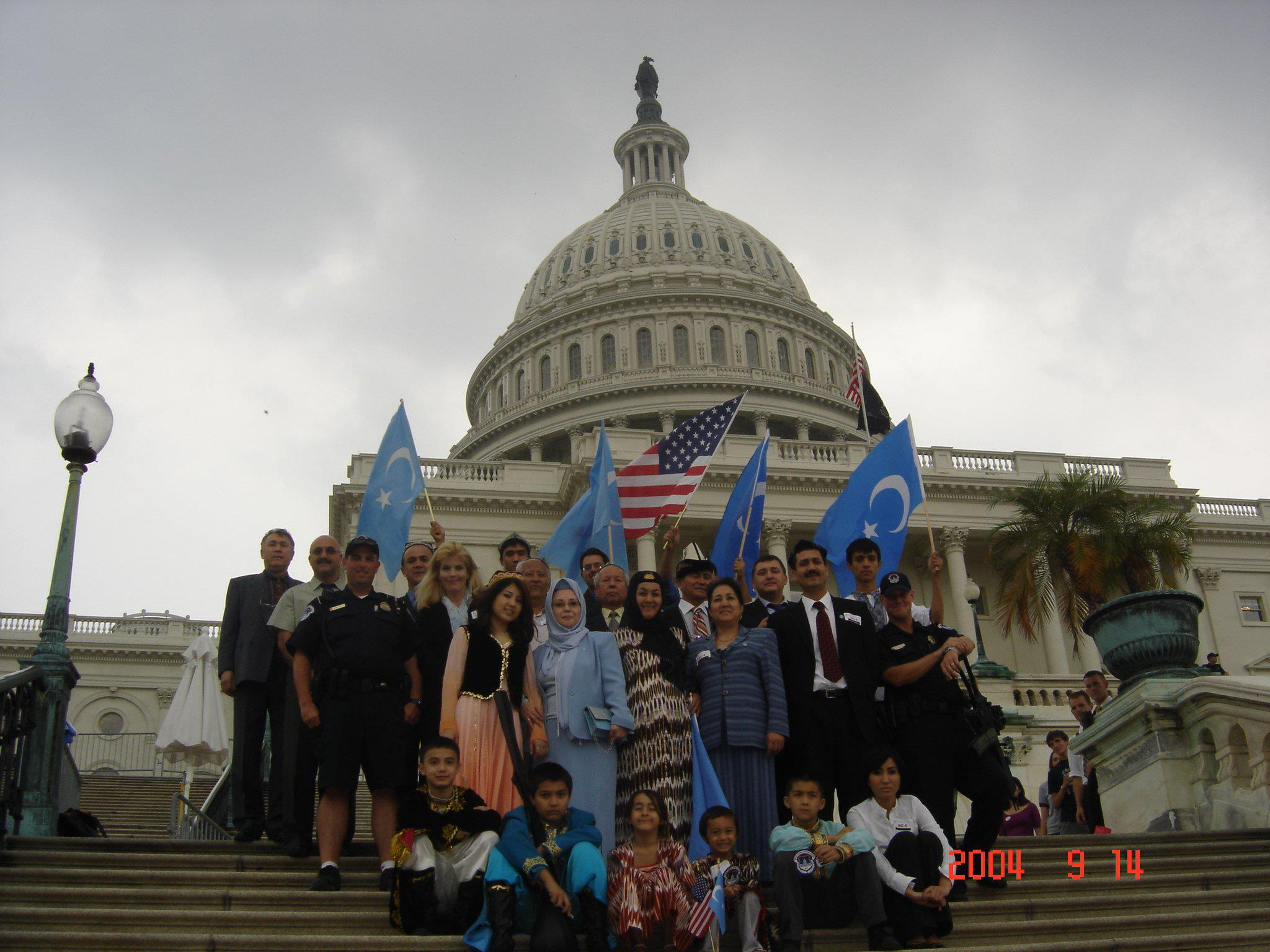
Proclamation of the Government in Exile of the Republic of East Turkistan, 14 September 2004

On September 14, 2004, Uyghurs and Kazakh members of the diaspora proclaimed the creation of the East Turkistan Government in Exile (ETGE) in Washington, D.C. and Turani was elected Prime Minister. China's Ministry of Foreign Affairs spokesperson Kong Quan publicly registered his displeasure, referencing such groups' terrorism in the Xinjiang region. In November, the U.S. government declared that it "does not recognize any East Turkestan government-in-exile, nor do we provide support for any such entity".

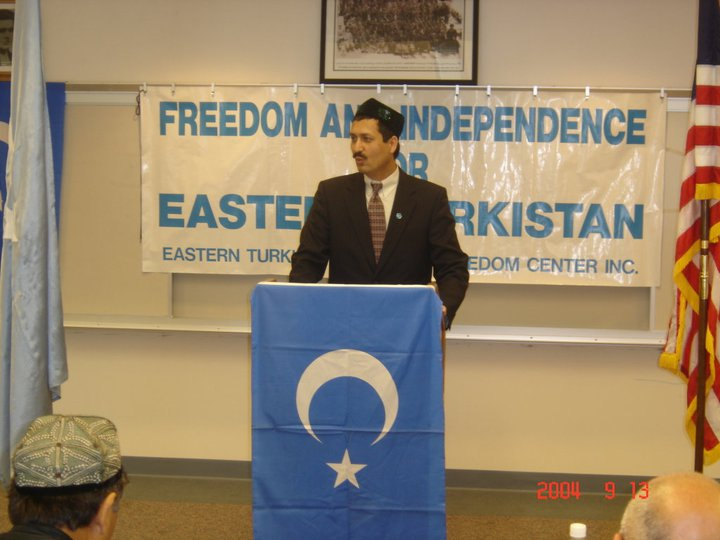
Anwar Yusuf Turani, the Founder and Prime Minister Elect of the East Turkistan Government in Exile, gives a speech at Annandale Regional Library in Virginia on September 13, 2004

According to East-Turkistan.net, the website widely recognized as the ETGE's official website, the ETGE Parliament impeached Turani for "violating the ETGE's Constitutional Amendment No.4" in 2006. Turani claimed that he faced an "attempted coup" on July 28, 2005, by ETGE officials who sought to "overthrow" him. Turani claimed to have expelled those against him and continued to run his own government since then. Despite the ETGE's constitution capping the length of office of the Prime Minister and President for any individual at two 4-year terms, Turani continued to claim himself as its Prime Minister from 2004 until 2019. Since 2019 he has subsequently claimed to be the ETGE's second president. Other than YouTube videos uploaded by Turani himself and some fringe Turkish articles, no mainstream or credible sources have credited him as president, or as prime minister since 2006.

=== Other ===
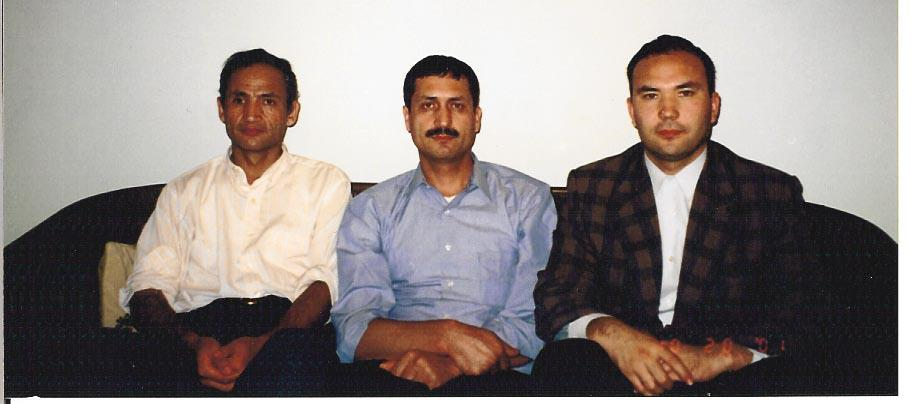
Turani with Hussayin Celil (right)

Turani criticized the People's Republic of China for imprisoning the Uyghur imam Huseyincan Celil. He compared Celil's arrest to that of Rebiya Kadeer and theorized that the PRC wanted to use Celil as leverage against Canada, where Celil held citizenship.

On August 3, 2014, Turani addressed Chinese human rights violations in East Turkistan at the Freedom Plaza in Washington, DC, following his performance of East Turkistan's national anthem with a tambur.

On July 15, 2015, he addressed scholars and journalists on the situation of the Uyghur people under the rule of communist China at the Chantilly Regional Library in Virginia.

On July 5, 2016, he told China to leave East Turkistan at a gathering in front of the Chinese consulate in Istanbul.

On July 29, 2016, Turani addressed the general situation of East Turkistan before scholars, politicians, freedom fighters and journalists at Sulaymania Mosque in Istanbul.

On November 14, 2019, he appealed to the U.S. government on behalf of East Turkistan during a visit to Istanbul to support the independence movement.

On November 12, 2020, during his speech at the Independence Day of East Turkistan, Turani called on the East Turkistani diaspora to fight for the independence of his homeland against China.

On February 12, 2021, Turani shared his thoughts and beliefs about the political situation of the United States in the aftermath of the 2020 Presidential election with his fellow countrymen in diaspora.

== See also ==
- Uyghur Americans
