= Ahmatjan Osman =

Uyghur poet and activist

- ئەخمەتجان ئوسمان

2rd President of the East Turkistan Government-in-Exile
- In office November 2015 – October 2018
- Preceded by: Ahmet Igemberdi
- Succeeded by: Ghulam Osman Yaghma

Personal details
- Born: 1964 (age 61–62) Ürümqi, Xinjiang
- Education: Xinjiang University, Damascus University
- Occupation: Poet and activist
- Writing career
- Language: Uyghur; Arabic
- Genres: Poetry; literary criticism
- Movement: Uyghur New Poetry (gungga)

Ahmatjan Osman (Uyghur: ئەخمەتجان ئوسمان; born 1964), also spelled Ekhmetjan, Exmetjan or Ahmetcan, is a Uyghur poet and Uyghur independence activist who writes in both Uyghur and Arabic. A leader of the Uyghur New Poetry (gungga) movement in the 1980s, he is considered one of the "foremost Uyghur poets of his generation". His use of free verse was influential in subsequent Uyghur poetics. His poetry has been described as trying to "capture the sacred and philosophical, the ineffable and the transient, in a wholly unique lyric voice".

== Early life ==
He grew up in Ürümqi, the largest city in Xinjiang. His father Osman Bey, a coal mine manager, was imprisoned for six years during the Cultural Revolution for being "bourgeois capitalist". He spent years in and out of the hospital after his release and died from lung disease. His mother, Cemile Hanım, taught him Uyghur folk tales and took care of their family, which included Ahmatjan's two siblings. His father's death and his mother's singing folk poetry to him influenced his work. Ahmatjan started writing poetry when he was twelve or thirteen years old. His work was first "published" when three of his poems were read on air by a radio station in Ürümqi when he was thirteen. After going to a famous experimental high school in Ürümqi, he entered Xinjiang University's Faculty of Language and Literature in 1981. His first Uyghur-language poetry collection was published in 1982.

In 1982, he went to Syria to study Arabic literature at Damascus University. He completed bachelor's and master's degree in Arabic literature. He returned to Ürümqi in 1990. He also worked as a journalist and continued to write. He made a splash with his controversial essays on literary theory.

== Exile ==
In 1994, he was arrested by the Chinese government for two months and then fled to Syria. While in Syria, he reoriented himself toward Arabic poetry and occasionally contributed to Radio Free Asia's Uyghur service. While in Syria, he married a Syrian Alawite woman.

In 2004, he was deported from Syria under pressure from the Chinese government. Upon learning of his expulsion, 270 figures from the world of Arab poetry (including renowned Syrian poet Adunis) signed a petition and staged a demonstration against the deportation order. The action was condemned by international Arabic newspapers in London and Lebanon. He left for Turkey, where he spent a few days, but again was deported due to Chinese government pressure. He finally received asylum in Canada, where he has been living since October 2004. There, he found work at a grocery store, a coffee factory, and as a forklift operator in a warehouse.

== Activism ==
Ahmatjan served as the president of the East Turkistan Government-in-Exile from November 2015 to October 2018, when he was dismissed for violating the East Turkistan Government in Exile's Constitution. His impeachment came after controversy regarding several public statements he made regarding Islamic faith in the Uyghur movement. In particular, Ahmatjan claimed that Oghuz Khagan, a legendary figure for various Turkic groups, should be considered an Uyghur prophet.

Despite his involvement in the Uyghur independence movement, Ahmatjan doesn't write poems explicitly about politics; his poems don't claim a particular political ideology.

== Poetry ==
=== Influences ===
Early on while in Xinjiang, Ahmatjan was influenced by Uyghur folk poetry sung to him by his mother, Uyghur poets of the previous generation like Qurban Barat and Boghda Abddulla, classical Uyghur poets like the eighteenth-century Sufi poet Shah Meshrep, and what he could find in Uyghur-language translations: collections of Tang poetry and Lao Zi, the contemporary Misty Poets writing in Mandarin, early nineteenth-century English and Russian Romantic poetry, and the essays of Vissarion Belinsky, the critic who originated of Russian social realism in the 1840s. Later, he picked up modernists like Paul Celan, Stéphane Mallarmé, and Arthur Rimbaud.

Once in Damascus, he immersed himself in Arabic literature, reading influential poets like the Syrian Adunis. According to critic Andre Naffis-Sahely, Adunis seemed to have a significant effect on Ahmatjan's work: "many of Ahmatjan's poems marry lyrical descriptions of the natural world with the human need to ask metaphysical questions" and he "seems to have adopted Adunis's use of the qit'a (or fragment) as one of the primary vessels for his poetics, juxtaposing images to create a vortex of sights, sounds, and ideas that always circle back to raw emotion". In turn, Adunis was one of the earliest admirers of Ahmatjan's Arabic poetry.

=== The Uyghur New Poetry movement (gungga) ===
In the 1980s, Ahmatjan was one of the leaders of the Uyghur New Poetry movement, known as gungga (hazy, vague, or uncertain) in Uyghur. There were several strands of influences that affected this movement. Symbolism and surrealism had just arrived in Xinjiang, after a long period of isolation from the 1950s to the 1980s. The experience of political repression during that era also drove them to more indirect means of expression. The direct inspiration, however, came from the Misty Poets group of the late 1970s and early 1980s (gungga was a direct translation of menglong, "obscure", "misty", or "hazy" in Mandarin.) The movement absorbed "the vision and the aesthetic principles of that groundbreaking movement through the literary manifestations were necessarily different."

The gungga movement's works were in free verse, not the aruz or syllabic metrical forms then dominant in Uyghur poetry. They relied on metaphor, contrast, images and symbols, instead of more direct means of expression. Their titles didn't directly relate to the bodies of the poems. Ahmatjan's choice of subjects included home, nation, and longing.

He gained critical attention after his poem Hain Dağlar ("Treacherous Mountains") was published by the popular literary magazine Tangritagh, based in Ürümqi. After that, he published his poems regularly in the magazine, which became the center of the movement.

According to Ahmatjan and Ablikim Baqi, the editor of Tangritagh, gungga "demonstrated an opening out of traditional form and content, an art unfettered by any implicit message of 'social value', and offered a new vision of Uyghur poetry as attuned to the French symbolists Baudelaire and Mallarmé, the surrealists Breton and Aragon, as well as to Manichean scripture and the Sufi poets Shah Meshrep and Ali-Shir Nava'i." These views were a departure from Maoist ideas of art as "proletarian revolutionary utilitarianism", and closer to Western Modernism's focus on "psychologizing, subjective, sometimes surreal art."

The movement started a fierce debate around tradition and authenticity in Uyghur letters. Critics of the movement said gungga poets simply lacked the skill to compose classical Uyghur poetry, with its strict metrical forms. The school's adherents countered that experimentation was crucial to the vitality and relevance of Uyghur poetry.

The movement declined after Ahmatjan's immigration to Syria in 1994 and his subsequent reorientation toward Arabic poetry. However, it left a mark on contemporaries like Perhat Tursun and Tahir Hamut Izgil and the next generation of Uyghur poets, who continued to write in free verse.

=== Translations ===
He has translated the poems of Rumi, Octavio Paz, Paul Celan, Fernando Pessoa, and Adunis into Uyghur. His eight collections of poetry (six in Arabic and two in Uyghur) have been published in Syria and Xinjiang.

At times, Ahmatjan has composed Arabic and Uyghur versions of a poem simultaneously over a period of years.

Jeffrey Yang published a collection of translations of Ahmatjan's Arabic and Uyghur poetry in Uyghurland in 2015; it was the first collection of Uyghur poetry to be translated into English. The translation was long-listed for the PEN Award for Poetry in Translation. Ahmatjan's work has also been anthologized in The Heart of Strangers, a collection of exile literature edited by Andre Naffis-Sahely.

== Works ==
=== Poetry collections ===
- Al-Suqût al-thânî (The Second Fall or The Second Stumble, Arabic), 1988
- Lughz Al-a'araas (The Mystery of Weddings, Arabic), 1990
- Uyghur Qizi Lerikisi (Ode to a Uyghur Girl or Uyghur Girl Lyric, Uyghur), 1992
- Roh Pesli (Moroccan Soul or Moroccan Spirit), 1996
- Al-wasiy Ala Al-thaat (Guardian of the Self), 1997
- Ka'an (As Though), 1998
- Fiy Atlaar Somar Haythu Oqiym (In Ruins of Sumer Where I Reside, Arabic), 2003
- Hissaty Min Al-layl (My Night Part or My Share of the Night, Arabic), 2007
- Season of the Soul

=== Translations of Ahmatjan Osman's work ===
- Uyghurland, the Farthest Exile, translated into English by Jeffrey Yang, 2015
- ああ、ウイグルの大地 (Oh, Land of Uyghurs), translated into Japanese by Mukai Dice and Makoto Kawai, 2015

=== Anthologies including Ahmatjan Osman's poems ===
- The Heart of Strangers, edited by Andre Naffis-Sahely, 2020
