= East Turkestan Republic =

East Turkestan Republic or East Turkistan Republic (ETR) may refer to the:

- First East Turkestan Republic (1933–1934), Islamic republic centered around the city of Kashgar
- Second East Turkestan Republic (1944–1946), Soviet-backed republic in northern Xinjiang
- East Turkistan Government in Exile (2004–present), exile government based in the United States

== See also ==
- East Turkestan independence movement
