= Qurtulush Yolida =

Uyghur patriotic song

English: On the Path to Salvation
- قۇرتۇلۇش مارشى
- National anthem of the First East Turkestan Republic and the East Turkistan exile government
- Lyrics: Mehmet Ali Tevfik, 1933

Audio sample
- Qurtulush Yolida: file; help

"Qurtulush Yolida" (Uyghur: قۇرتۇلۇش يولیدا; "On the Path to Salvation"), also known as "Qurtulush Marshi" (قۇرتۇلۇش مارشى; "March of Salvation"), is a Uyghur patriotic song which served as the national anthem of the First East Turkestan Republic and serves as the de facto anthem of the East Turkistan Government in Exile. The song was written by Mehmet Ali Tevfik in 1933.

== Lyrics ==
Uyghur Arabic alphabet

قۇرتۇلۇش يولىدا سۇدەك ئاقتى بىزنىڭ قانىمىز،
𝄆 سەن ئۈچۈن، ئەي يۇرتىمىز، بولسۇن پىدا بۇ جانىمىز۔ 𝄇
𝄆 قان كېچىپ، ھەم جان بېرىپ، ئاخىر قۇتۇلدۇردۇق سېنى، 𝄇
𝄆 قەلبىمىزدە قۇتقۇزۇشقا بار ئىدى ئىمانىمىز۔ 𝄇

يارۇ ھەمدەم بولدى بىزنىڭ ھىممىتىمىز سەن ئۈچۈن،
𝄆 دۇنيانى سورىغان ئىدى ھىممەت بىلەن ئەجدادىمىز۔ 𝄇
𝄆 يۇرتۇمىز، بىز يۈز-كۆزۈڭنى قان بىلەن پاكىزلىدۇق، 𝄇
𝄆 ئەمدى ھېچ كىرلەتمىگەيمىز، چۈنكى تۈركتۇر نامىمىز۔ 𝄇

𝄆 ئاتىللا، چىڭگىز، تۆمۈر دۇنيانى تىترەتكەن ئىدى، 𝄇
𝄆 جان بېرىپ شان ئالىمىز، بىز ھەم ئۇلار ئەۋلادىبىز۔ 𝄇
𝄆 چىقتى جان، ھەم ئاقتى قان، دۈشمەندىن بولدى ئەل-ئامان 𝄇
𝄆 ياشىسۇن، ھېچ ئۆلمىسۇن، پارلانسۇن ئىستىقبالىمىز 𝄇

Uyghur Latin alphabet

Qurtulush yolida sudek aqti bizning qanimiz,
𝄆 Sen üchün, ey yurtimiz, bolsun pida bu janimiz. 𝄇
𝄆 Qan këchip, hem jan bërip, axir qutuldurduq sëni, 𝄇
𝄆 Qelbimizde qutquzushqa bar idi imanimiz. 𝄇

Yaru hemdem boldi bizning himmitimiz sen üchün,
𝄆 Dunyani sorighan idi himmet bilen ejdadimiz. 𝄇
𝄆 Yurtumiz, biz yüz-közüngni qan bilen pakizliduq, 𝄇
𝄆 Emdi hëch kirletmigeymiz, chünki türktur namimiz. 𝄇

𝄆 Atilla, Chinggiz, Tömür dunyani titretken idi, 𝄇
𝄆 Jan bërip shan alimiz, biz hem ular ewladibiz. 𝄇
𝄆 Chiqti jan, hem aqti qan, düshmendin boldi el-aman 𝄇
𝄆 Yashisun, hëch ölmisun, parlansun istiqbalimiz. 𝄇

Uyghur Cyrillic alphabet

Қуртулуш йолида судәк ақти бизниң қанимиз,
𝄆 Сән үчүн, әй юртимиз, болсун пида бу җанимиз. 𝄇
𝄆 Қан кëчип, һәм җан бëрип, ахир қутулдурдуқ сëни, 𝄇
𝄆 Қәлбимиздә қутқузушқа бар иди иманимиз. 𝄇

Яру һәмдәм болди бизниң һиммитимиз сән үчүн,
𝄆 Дуняни сориған иди һиммәт билән әҗдадимиз. 𝄇
𝄆 Юртумиз, биз йүз-көзүңни қан билән пакизлидуқ, 𝄇
𝄆 Әмди һëч кирләтмигәймиз, чүнки түрктур намимиз. 𝄇

𝄆 Атилла, чиңгиз, төмүр дуняни титрәткән иди, 𝄇
𝄆 Җан бëрип шан алимиз, биз һәм улар әвладибиз. 𝄇
𝄆 Чиқти җан, һәм ақти қан, дүшмәндин болди әл-аман 𝄇
𝄆 Яшисун, һëч өлмисун, парлансун истиқбалимиз. 𝄇

IPA transcription

[qʰʊr.tʊ.ɫʊɕ jo.ɫɨ.dɑ sʊ.dæk ǀ ɑχ.tɨ bɪz.nɪŋ qʰɑ.nɨ.mɨz ǀ]
𝄆 [sæn ʏ.t͡ɕʰʏn ǀ æɪ jʊr.tɨ.mɨz ǀ boɫ.sʊn pʰɨ.dɑ bʊ d͡ʑɑ.nɨ.mɨz ǁ] 𝄇
𝄆 [qʰɑn kʰe.t͡ɕʰɪp ǀ hæm d͡ʑɑn be.rɪp ǀ ɑ.χɨr qʰʊr.tʊɫ.dʊr.dʊq se.nɪ ǀ] 𝄇
𝄆 [qʰæl.bɪ.mɪz.dæ qʰʊt.qʊ.zʊɕ.qɑ ǀ bɑr ɪ.dɪ ɪ.mɑ.nɨ.mɨz ǁ] 𝄇

[jɑ.rʊ hæm.dæm boɫ.dɨ bɪz.nɪŋ ǀ hɪm.mɪ.tʰɪ.mɪz sæn ʏ.t͡ɕʰʏn ǀ]
𝄆 [dʊn.jɑ.nɨ so.rɨ.ʁɑn ɪ.dɪ ǀ hɪm.mæt bɪ.læn æʑ.dɑ.dɨ.mɨz ǁ] 𝄇
𝄆 [jʊr.tʊ.mɨz ǀ bɪz jʏz kø.zʏŋ.nɪ ǀ qʰɑn bɪ.læn pʰɑ.kʰiz.ɫɪ.dʊq ǀ] 𝄇
𝄆 [æm.dɪ het͡ɕ kʰɪr.læt.mɪ.geɪ.mɪz 𝄇 t͡ɕʰʏn.kɪ tʰʏrk.tʊr nɑ.mɨ.mɨz 𝄇] 𝄇

𝄆 [ɑ.tʰɨɫ.ɫɑ ǀ t͡ɕʰɪŋ.gɪz tʰø.mʏr ǀ dʊn.jɑ.nɨ tʰɪt.ræt.kæn ɪ.dɪ ǀ] 𝄇
𝄆 [d͡ʑɑn be.rɪp ɕɑn ɑ.ɫɨ.mɨz ǀ bɪz hæm ʊ.ɫɑr ǀ æw.ɫɑ.dɨ.bɨz ǁ] 𝄇
𝄆 [t͡ɕʰɨχ.tɨ d͡ʑɑn ǀ hæm ɑχ.tɨ qʰɑn ǀ dʏɕ.mæn.dɪn boɫ.dɨ æl ɑ.mɑn ǀ] 𝄇
𝄆 [jɑ.ɕɨ.sʊn ǀ het͡ɕ øl.mi.sʊn ǀ pʰɑr.ɫɑn.sʊn ɪs.tɪχ.bɑ.ɫɨ.mɨz ǁ] 𝄇

English translation

Like a river our blood flowed on the road to salvation
𝄆 For Thee, oh homeland, may our lives be our sacrifice. 𝄇
𝄆 Thee we saved by shedding our blood and lives, 𝄇
𝄆 For Thy liberty we had faith in our hearts. 𝄇

To Thee may our efforts be handed,
𝄆 Our fathers have once ruled this very world, 𝄇
𝄆 Thee we cleansed with blood, o Fatherland, 𝄇
𝄆 Ne'er shall our name of Turk be spoiled. 𝄇

𝄆 Attila, Genghis, Tamerlane once trembled this very world, 𝄇
𝄆 By giving blood and earning honour, we are their very children. 𝄇
𝄆 We granted our lives, poured our blood, avenged the enemy; 𝄇
𝄆 May our future shine and prosper for eternity. 𝄇
