= Mamtimin Ala =

Australian Uyghur politician

- مەمتىمىن ئەلا
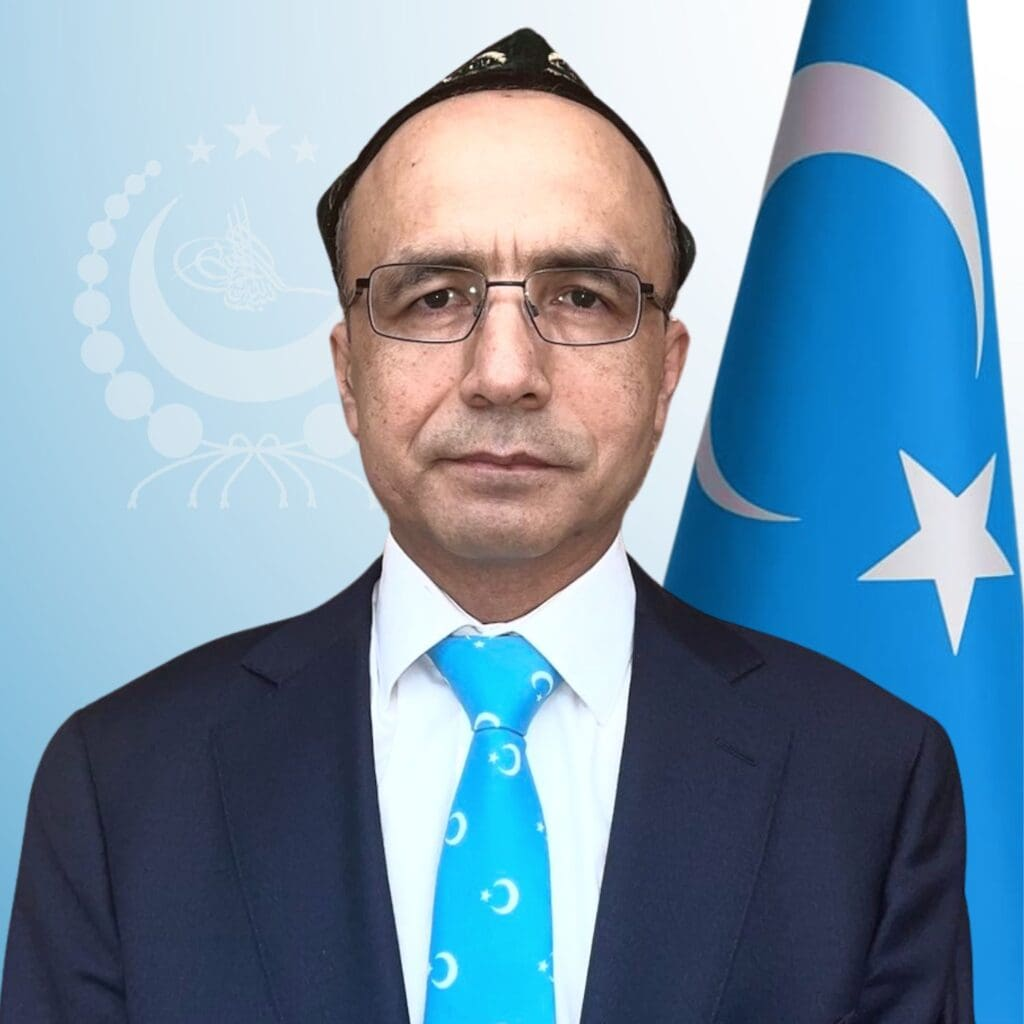
- Ala in 2023

(East Turkestan) 4th president of the East Turkistan Government-in-Exile
- Incumbent
- Assumed office 12 November 2023
- Preceded by: Ghulam Osman Yaghma

President of the Australian Uyghur Association
- In office November 2012 – November 2018

Vice President of the World Uyghur Congress
- In office May 2012 – July 2016

General Secretary of the Australian Uyghur Association
- In office November 2008 – November 2012

Personal details
- Born: 6 November 1971 (age 55) Artush, Xinjiang, China
- Education: KU Leuven (PhD)
- Occupation: Independence leader, politician, philosopher, and writer

Mamtimin Ala (Uyghur: مەمتىمىن ئەلا; born in Artush) is an Australian Uyghur politician and independence leader who has been the president of the East Turkistan Government-in-Exile since November 2023. An advocate for Uyghur rights and the East Turkestan independence movement, Ala has held leadership roles in Uyghur diaspora organizations, testified before international bodies, and authored works reflecting on the persecution of Uyghurs in China through philosophical and psychological lenses. His advocacy emphasizes decolonization, cultural preservation, and global recognition of Chinese policies in the region as colonial and genocidal.

== Early life and education ==
Mamtimin Ala was born in Artush (Atush), Xinjiang (referred to as East Turkistan by Ala and many Uyghur activists). He received a Ph.D. in philosophy with magna cum laude honors from KU Leuven.

In August 2008, while on holiday in Australia as a PhD student in Belgium, Ala sought political asylum after his mother was placed under house arrest.

== Political leadership and advocacy ==
Ala's political career and advocacy for Uyghur rights began after his relocation to Australia in 2008. He served as General Secretary of the Australian Uyghur Association (AUA) from November 2008 to November 2012. In this role, he advocated for Australia to resettle 17 Uyghur detainees from Guantanamo Bay who had been cleared for release, arguing that Australia, as an active participant in the war on terror, shared responsibility for the "remnants or debris" of that conflict. He noted China's aggressive efforts to persuade Australia against accepting them and emphasized Australia's moral obligation, given its large Uyghur community.

Ala also organized protests in Sydney against Chinese actions in Urumqi following the July 2009 Urumqi riots, which resulted in at least 156 deaths, numerous injuries, and over 1,000 arrests of Uyghurs. On July 8, 2009, he participated in a rally outside the Chinese consulate in Sydney, where protesters chanted for freedom and justice for Uighurs. Ala stated that about 2000 Uighurs lived in Australia and urged the Australian Government to put diplomatic pressure on China to exercise maximum restraint and handle the problem in a more rational, moral, and legal way.

In February 2012, Ala testified before the Australian Parliament's Joint Standing Committee on Foreign Affairs, Defence and Trade's Subcommittee on Human Rights, providing evidence on the human rights situation of Uyghurs in East Turkistan, including post-2009 Urumqi events and policies affecting Uyghur children. He also participated in a hearing by the Australian Federal Parliament's Human Rights Commission on Uyghur human rights issues, aiming to inform the Australia-China human rights dialogue.

From May 2012 to July 2016, Ala served as Vice President of the World Uyghur Congress (WUC), focusing on global Uyghur issues, including recognition in the Islamic world and human rights.

Ala served as President of the AUA from November 2012 to November 2018, following the organization's elections, and had previously held the role in an earlier term. In this capacity, he organized conferences, published articles, and supported Uyghur individuals internationally. In November 2016, he was re-elected as President of the AUA. In July 2018, Ala chaired the opening session of the "Uyghur Intellectuals Forum" at George Washington University in Washington, D.C., where Uyghur intellectuals from various countries discussed strategies to address the situation in East Turkistan.

In September 2018, as President of the AUA, Ala urged the Australian government to consider sanctions against China over the treatment of Uyghurs in Xinjiang, where the UN estimated up to 1 million were held in detention centers. He described the communication blackout and psychological pressure on the Uyghur diaspora.

== East Turkistan Government in Exile ==
Since early 2021, Ala has served as the strategic advisor to the president of the East Turkistan Government in Exile. In April 2021, Ala protested outside the Chinese ambassador's residence in Canberra during an event hosted by Ambassador Cheng Jingye, describing it as an attempt "to defend what is indefensible" in the context of growing international criticism of the Uyghur genocide.

In August 2021, Ala co-authored an article in Foreign Policy magazine, arguing that Chinese colonization and occupation of East Turkistan was the root of the ongoing genocide and restoring East Turkistan's independence was the only way forward for Uyghurs.

In September 2022, Ala co-authored an opinion piece criticizing the UN's 2022 report on China's atrocities in East Turkistan for downplaying the genocide and failing to hold China accountable.

In September 2023, as strategic adviser for the ETGE, Ala urged the 78th UN General Assembly to prioritize the East Turkistan issue and take decisive action to halt China's genocide, criticizing the international community's inaction as a moral failure.

On November 11, 2023, Ala was elected as the president of the East Turkistan Government-in-Exile at its 9th General Assembly. The ETGE, a government-in-exile, represents Uyghur and other Turkic peoples' interests, coordinating with international bodies to challenge Chinese policies.

== Publications ==
Ala is the author of Worse than Death: Reflections on the Uyghur Genocide (Hamilton Books, 2021; Uyghur edition 2020). The book reflects on the cultural and physical genocide against Uyghurs through personal and philosophical lenses. The Uyghur edition, titled "Uyghur Qetli'ami - Pisixologiyelik Nezer", was published in 2020 by Teklimakan Uyghur Neshiriyati in Istanbul.

His articles include:

- "Between Utopia and Dystopia: Uyghur Intellectuals (1949-2000)" in the Central Asia Program's Uyghur Initiative Papers (October 2014).
- "Turn in the Two-Faced: The Plight of Uyghur Intellectuals" in The Diplomat (October 2018).
- "Independence Is the Only Way Forward for East Turkestan" in Foreign Policy (August 2021).
