= Elnigar Iltebir =

Uyghur-US politician/scholar

Director for China at the United States National Security Council
- Incumbent
- Assumed office August 2019

Personal details
- Born: 1 June 1984 (age 42) Ürümqi, Xinjiang, China
- Education: University of Maryland, College Park; Harvard Kennedy School; The George Washington University
- Occupation: Politician

Elnigar Iltebir (born 1982) is an American politician and scholar. The Trump administration appointed her as Director for China in the United States National Security Council in August 2019.

== Personal life ==
Elnigar Iltebir was born in Ürümqi, Xinjiang in 1982. In 1992, she moved to Istanbul, Turkey with her family and lived there until she completed her high school education in Kabataş Erkek Lisesi. In February 2000, her family moved to the United States.

Iltebir is the daughter of Ablikim Baqi Iltebir, who is a well-known Uyghur writer and journalist. The elder Iltebir worked as a middle school teacher, was the chief editor in "Tengritagh Journal" and vice-president of "Urumchi Art Union" in Urumchi, and worked for Radio Free Asia from February 2000 to August 2017. Ablikim Baqi Iltebir died on August 8, 2019, at the age of 68.

== Education ==
- University of Maryland, College Park

Doctor of Philosophy (Ph.D.), International Security and Economic Policy

2009-2015

- Harvard Kennedy School

MPP, International Security and Political Economy

2005-2007

- The George Washington University

B.A., International Relations

2001-2005

== See also ==
- Uyghur Americans
- United States National Security Council
