= Sayragul Sauytbay =

Kazakh political activist (born 1977)

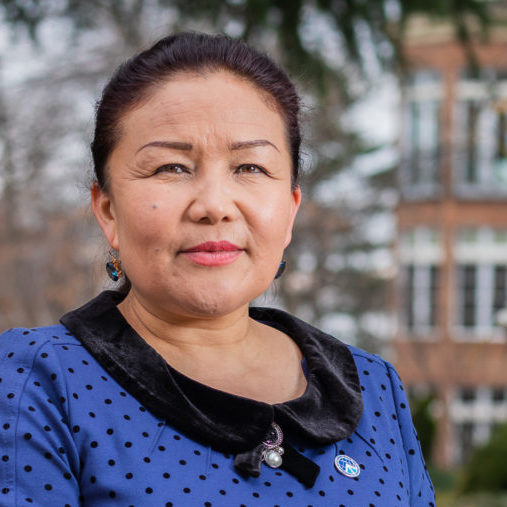
- Sauytbay in 2020

Vice President of the East Turkistan Government-in-Exile
- Incumbent
- Assumed office 12 November 2023
- Preceded by: Abdulahat Nur

Personal details
- Born: 1977 (age 48–49) Ili Kazakh Autonomous Prefecture, Xinjiang, People's Republic of China
- Spouse: Uali Islam
- Children: 2
- Occupation: physician and headteacher
- Known for: whistleblower about the persecution of Uyghurs in China

Chinese name
- Simplified Chinese: 萨伊拉古尔·索伊特拜
- Traditional Chinese: 薩伊拉古爾·索伊特拜
Transcriptions
Standard Mandarin
- Hanyu Pinyin: Sàyīlāgǔ'ěr Suǒyītèbài

Uyghur name
- Uyghur: سايراگٷل ساۋىتباي

Kazakh name
- Kazakh: شاىراگٷل ساۋىتباى; Сайрагүл Сауытбай; Sayragül Sawıtbay

Sayragul Sauytbay (Kazakh: Сайрагүл Сауытбай; born 1977) is a Kazakh political activist and whistleblower from China. In 2018, she fled China and then told the media about the Xinjiang re-education camps resembling modern-day concentration camps where people are "re-educated". She became one of the first victims of these camps in the world to speak publicly about the Chinese repressive campaign against Muslims, igniting a movement against these abuses. Sweden offered her political asylum after Kazakhstan refused, and she subsequently emigrated there.

In March 2020, she received the International Women of Courage Award from the United States Department of State. In March 2021 she was awarded the Internationaler Nürnberger Menschenrechtspreis (the International Human Rights prize of the city of Nuremberg, Germany), for 2021; the prize ceremony was held 15 May 2022.

Also in 2021, she testified among other survivors, as a witness at the Uyghur Tribunal in London.

On 11 November 2023 she was elected as the Vice President of the East Turkistan Government in Exile at the 9th East Turkistan General Assembly in Washington, DC.

== Life ==
=== China ===
Sayragul was born in 1977 in the Ili Kazakh Autonomous Prefecture in China. She is an ethnic Kazakh Chinese national. She married Uali Islam, with whom she has two children.

After finishing a medical degree at a university in China, she subsequently worked as a doctor, teacher, education director, and headmaster in several preschools. In 2016 she and her family attempted to emigrate to Kazakhstan but were denied permission to do so by the Chinese authorities. Subsequently she was reassigned from teaching in a kindergarten to a new job in a detention camp. From November 2017 to March 2018, Sayragul was forced by the Chinese authorities to teach Chinese to Kazakh detainees there, and during that time she witnessed numerous instances of abuse of detainees, including rape. While working at the camp she was not allowed to contact her family. The camp she worked in held about 2,500 ethnic Kazakhs. She herself was also subject to torture during her stay in the camps.

Her family was able to leave during the summer of 2016; they received Kazakh citizenship within a year. That angered the authorities who told her that she had to convince them to return to China; her passport was confiscated and she was told by the authorities she would never be allowed to leave China, as well as that she would face internment in the camps herself for several years. She was also accused by the authorities of spying for Kazakhstan. In March 2018, to avoid being sent back to the camps, where she feared she would die, Sayragul decided to flee to Kazakhstan, where her family had already found refuge shortly before.

=== Kazakhstan ===
She crossed the Chinese-Kazakh border on 5 April 2018 using false documents. Following a report by the Chinese authorities, she was arrested on 21 May by agents of the National Security Committee (Kazakh security and intelligence agency) for illegally crossing the border. On 13 July, Sayragul appeared in a court in the city of Zharkent, Kazakhstan accused of illegally crossing the border from China, facing $7,000 in fines or a one-year jail sentence. During the trial she revealed extensive information about the maltreatment of prisoners at the camp which garnered the attention of the international public. She also said that revealing that information made her subject to the death penalty in China as it was considered to be state secrets. Her lawyer argued that if she were extradited to China, she would face the death penalty for exposing re-education camps in Kazakh court. Her testimony on the re-education camps became the focus of the court case in Kazakhstan, which also tested the country's ties with Beijing; the Kazakh government was said to be facing a difficult choice of angering a powerful neighbour or displaying its inability to protect the Kazakh people. Some Kazakh activists described her as a hero for revealing the fate of the mistreated Kazakh minority in China. While China officially did not comment about the trial and her claims, Sayragul received information that members of her family and friends still in Xinjiang had been arrested and possibly sent to a camp by Chinese authorities, which she interpreted as an attempt to cow her into silence.

On 1 August 2018, Sayragul was released with a six-month suspended sentence and direction to regularly check in with police. After the trial, she was also subject to pressure to stay silent under threats to her family's safety. During the trial she also submitted a request for aid to the United Nations High Commissioner for Refugees. She also applied for asylum in Kazakhstan to avoid being deported to China. Eventually, however, Kazakhstan refused to grant her asylum because she had crossed the border illegally.

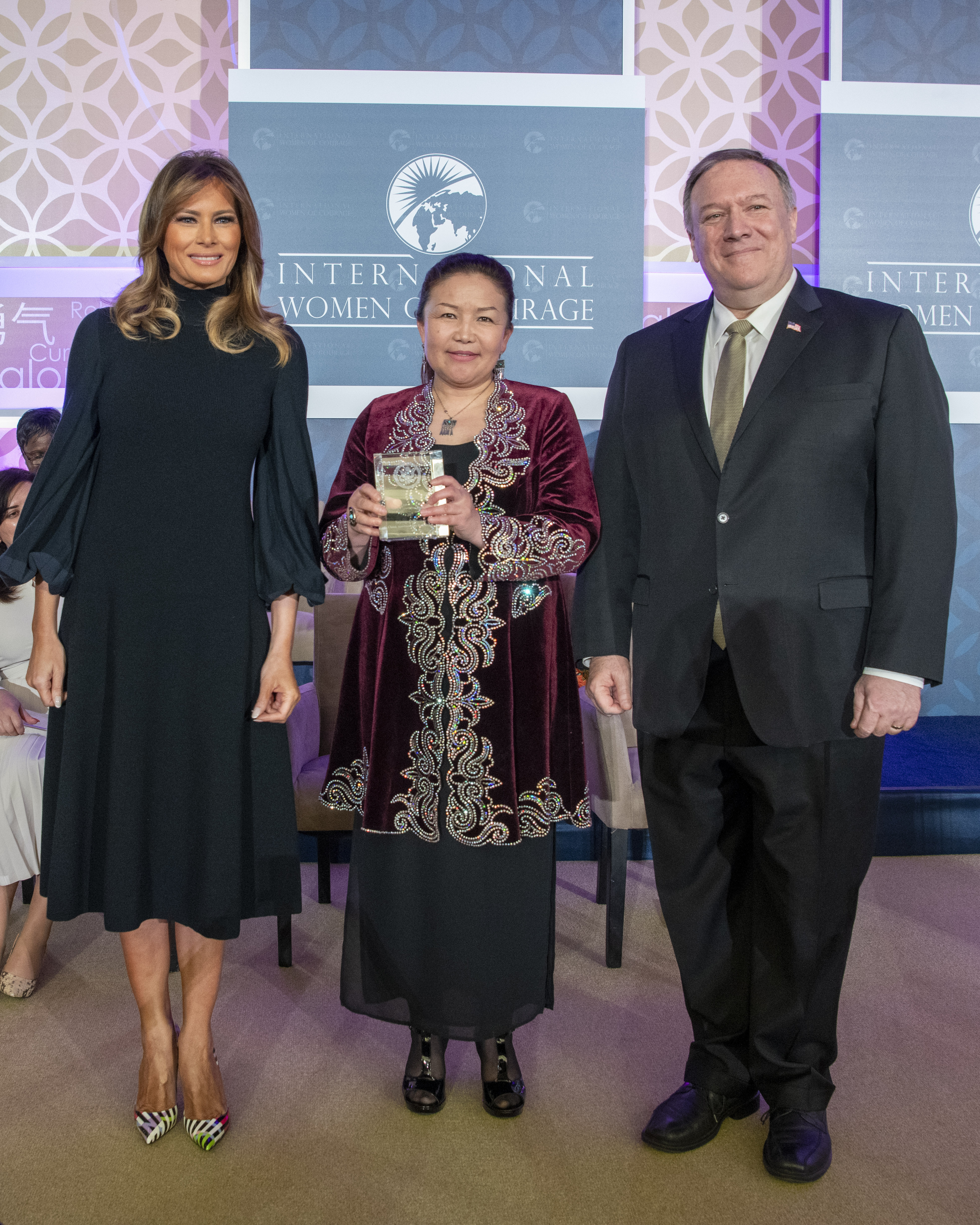
Mike Pompeo gives IWOC award to Sayragul Sauytbay (Melania Trump is to the left)

=== Sweden ===
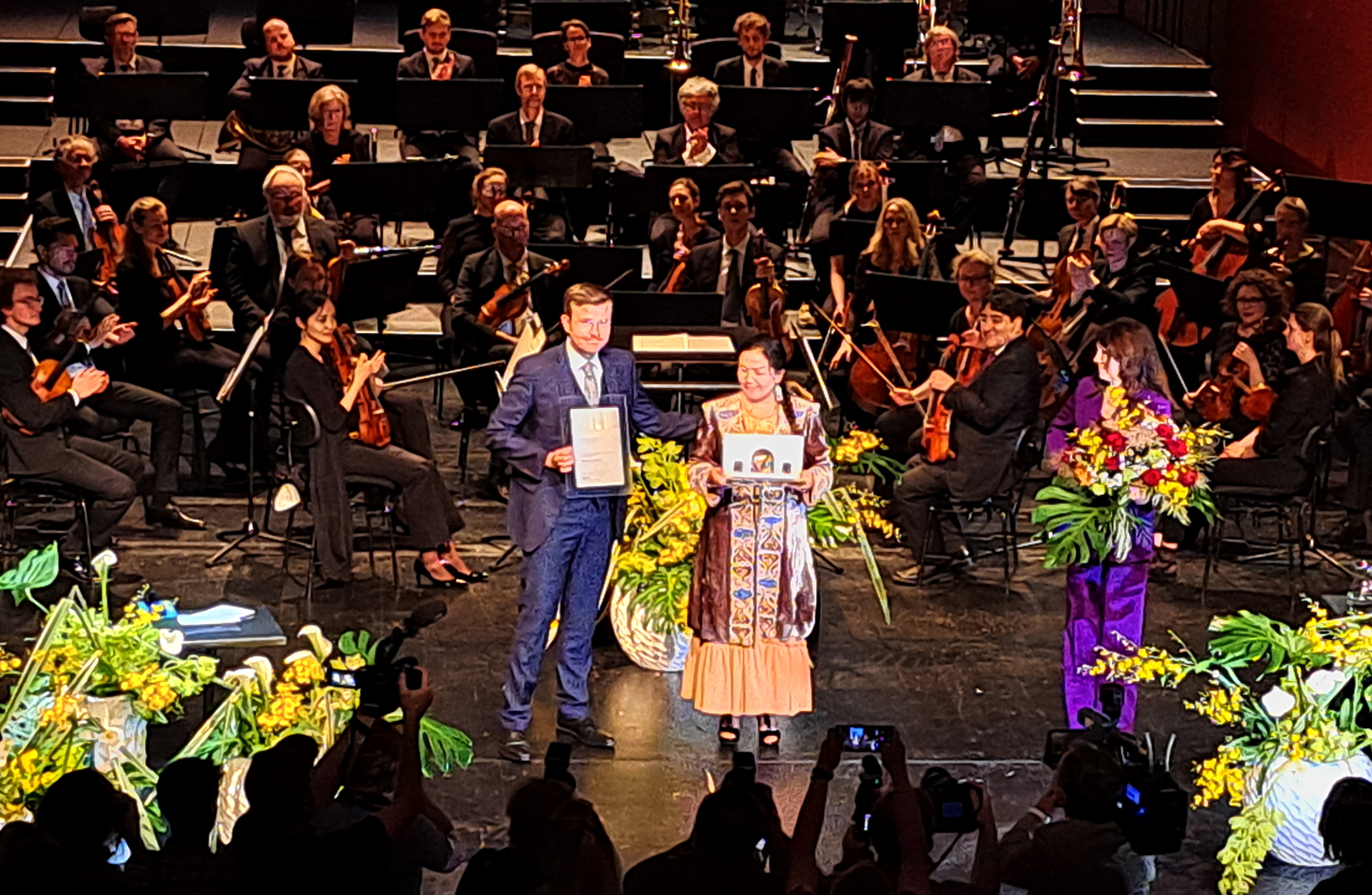
Sayragul Sauytbay with the Mayor of Nuremberg at the International Human Rights Award ceremony in Nuremberg on 15 May 2022. Photo: Magnus Fiskesjö.

On 2 June 2019, after the intercession of the United Nations, she flew to Sweden where she was given political asylum.

Sayragul was chosen as an International Woman of Courage on 4 March 2020 by the US Secretary of State, Mike Pompeo.

German-language book Die Kronzeugin, which appeared in mid 2020, was written by Alexandra Cavelius on the basis of interviews with Sayragul. An English translation of the book, in which Sayragul describes her experiences in a Xinjiang re-education camp, was published by Scribe in May 2021 under the title, The Chief Witness: Escape from China's Modern-day Concentration Camps. Since then, there are editions of the book in several other languages, including Swedish.

In 2020, Sayragul said that she was being constantly harassed by the "long arm of China", receiving "death threats from Chinese callers". In 2021 she said that her family in China was subject to constant surveillance and unable to contact her.

In early 2021, Sayragul won the Nuremberg International Human Rights Award. A jury member noted that the reason for this was that "despite constant threats and attempts at intimidation, she gave fearless testimony and stood up for the Muslim minorities in China with admirable courage"; the jury also wanted to draw public attention to the persecution of minorities and to recognize the advocacy of women for human rights. Because of the COVID-19 pandemic, the award ceremony was delayed to 15 May 2022. The formal jury motivation for the prize can be found in English and German, at the site of the City of Nuremberg dedicated to the International Human Rights Prize. The prize ceremony was held on 15 May 2022.

In 2021, Sayragul participated among other survivors, as a witness in the public hearings of the Uyghur Tribunal in London, and contributed answers to hearing questions, and a statement.

== Reaction by China ==
Chinese authorities denied the claims by Sayragul, stating that she had fled abroad after being suspected of fraud, that she had never worked in or been detained in any "vocational education and training center", (Note: The Chinese term for the Xinjiang internment camp) and that "her words about seeing people tortured cannot be true".

== See also ==
- Persecution of Uyghurs in China
