= Salih Hudayar =

Uyghur independence activist (born 1993)

- سالىھ خۇدايار
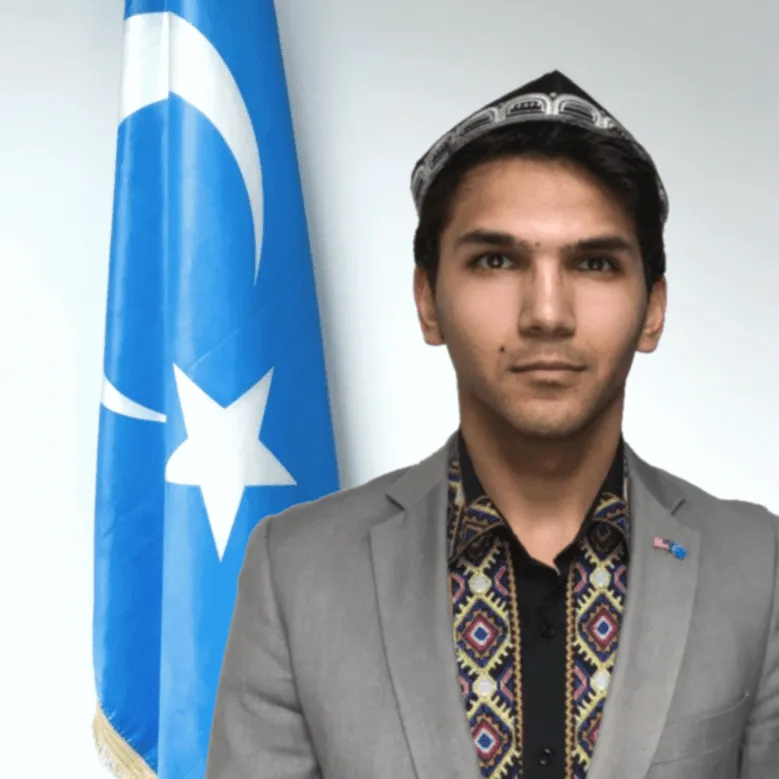
- Hudayar in 2019

Foreign Minister of the East Turkistan Government-in-Exile
- Incumbent
- Assumed office 11 November 2023

Prime Minister of the East Turkistan Government-in-Exile
- In office 11 November 2019 – 10 November 2023
- Preceded by: Ismail Cengiz
- Succeeded by: Abdulahat Nur

Founder and President of the East Turkistan National Awakening Movement

Personal details
- Born: 21 May 1993 (age 33) Atush, Xinjiang
- Education: University of Oklahoma (BA); American Military University (MA)
- Occupation: Politician and independence leader
- Website: East Turkistan Government in Exile; ETNAM

Military service
- Allegiance: United States
- Branch/service: Oklahoma Army National Guard
- Years of service: 2011–2013
- Rank: Private First Class
- Unit: 179th Infantry Regiment (United States)

Salih Hudayar (Uyghur: سالىھ خۇدايار; born 21 May 1993) is a Uyghur-American politician known for advocating for East Turkistan independence. He founded the East Turkistan National Awakening Movement, now known as the East Turkistan National Movement, and has since been leading the movement calling for the "restoration of East Turkistan's independence."

On 11 November 2019, Hudayar was elected as the Prime Minister of the East Turkistan Government-in-Exile. He served as Prime Minister until the ETGE's 9th General Assembly in November 2023, when he was appointed Minister of Foreign Affairs and Security.

Hudayar was among the first to publicly campaign for international recognition of the Uyghur genocide, and in 2020 helped lead the ETGE and ETNM's complaint to the International Criminal Court against Chinese officials. He has pressed governments to recognize East Turkistan as an occupied country and has been an outspoken critic of Chinese transnational repression and intelligence operations targeting the East Turkistan independence movement. In May 2026, he spearheaded the ETGE and ETNM's petition to the UN Special Committee on Decolonization seeking East Turkistan's listing as a Non-Self-Governing Territory and the implementation of the Declaration on the Granting of Independence to Colonial Countries and Peoples.

== Early life and education ==
Hudayar was born to a Uyghur business family in Atush in 1993. He came to the United States in June 2000 at the age of seven, when his family resettled in Cleveland County, Oklahoma as political refugees. He attended Hubbard Elementary and Curtis Middle School in Noble, Oklahoma, moved to Norman, Oklahoma in 2005, was naturalized as a U.S. citizen in 2009, and graduated from Norman North High School in 2011.

After high school, Hudayar enrolled at the University of Central Oklahoma to take part in the ROTC, hoping to become a military officer. He joined the Oklahoma Army National Guard and reached the rank of private first class in the 179th Infantry Regiment, serving from 2011 to 2013. A kidney condition discovered after a medical emergency during a 2013 training exercise led to a medical discharge.

He subsequently transferred to the University of Oklahoma, graduating in 2017 with a Bachelor of Arts in International and Area Studies and a minor in political science. He later pursued a Master of Arts in National Security Studies at American Military University, graduating in 2025.

== East Turkistan National Awakening Movement ==
In the summer of 2017, Hudayar founded the East Turkistan National Awakening Movement and moved from Oklahoma to Washington, D.C., to engage in human rights and political advocacy. He has said he established the group because he believed existing Uyghur organizations prioritized autonomy within China over full independence. From early 2018 he met with members of Congress to advocate for the Uyghur Human Rights Policy Act, and beginning in June 2018 he organized weekly demonstrations outside the United States Capitol and the White House. The movement was later renamed the East Turkistan National Movement.

== Campaigning for East Turkistan's independence ==
After the East Turkistan National Awakening Movement's public launch on 4 June 2018, Hudayar has been leading a global movement openly advocating for the "restoration of East Turkistan's independence." In September 2019, he launched a petition to the White House which got over 108,000 signatures, calling on the US Government to "prevent a 21st century Holocaust in East Turkistan" and "recognize East Turkistan as an Occupied country." On 13 November 2018, Salih Hudayar led hundreds of Uyghurs from the White House to the US Capitol in commemoration of the 85th Anniversary of the First East Turkistan Republic and the 74th Anniversary of the Second East Turkistan Republic's declaration of independence. The demonstrators called on the US Congress to pass a Uyghur Act and called for "freedom and independence for East Turkistan."

Despite calls for independence being viewed as "controversial" by other Uyghur groups like the Uyghur American Association, Uyghur Human Rights Project, and the World Uyghur Congress, Hudayar has repeatedly stated that "the only way we [Uyghurs] can ensure our freedoms and human rights is by restoring our independence and that's the only way we can ensure our overall survival as a whole."

In an interview with the Middle East Eye, Hudayar stated that Uyghurs want the United States to understand that the Uyghurs are an occupied people and that the majority of them believe that restoring East Turkistan's independence is the only way forward.

On 9 April 2019, Salih Hudayar delivered a speech calling on the "free world" to support the East Turkistan movement at the newly launched Committee on the Present Danger China Roundtable. A month later, in May 2019, Hudayar was invited by Frank Gaffney to speak about China's persecution of Uyghur and other Turkic peoples at an event hosted by Save the Persecuted Christians.

In July 2019, the East Turkistan National Awakening Movement published 124 coordinates of "suspected concentration camps" in East Turkistan. In October 2019, Agence France-Presse (AFP) interviewed Salih Hudayar regarding China's destruction of Uyghur graves and cultural sites. Hudayar told the AFP that China was destroying historical sites and cemeteries to disconnect Uyghurs from their history and their ancestors and "eradicate any evidence" of who the Uyghurs are. In November 2019, Hudayar attended a pro-Hong Kong rally in Washington, D.C., where he told Voice of America that "Uyghurs stand with the people of Hong Kong, and if Hong Kong falls then [we] face the same situation we are going through." Speaking to Al Jazeera in February 2020, he compared China's economic takeover of Central Asia to its Xinjiang policies since 1949, saying: "In the long run, [the Central Asian governments] will too become like us, they will lose their independence in favour of some small economic benefits."

As Prime Minister and later Foreign Minister of the East Turkistan Government in Exile (ETGE), Hudayar continued to frame the situation in East Turkistan as colonial occupation rather than solely a human-rights issue, organizing annual commemorations of the invasion by Chinese forces in 1949 and calling for international recognition of East Turkistan as an occupied country. On 5 May 2026, the ETGE and the East Turkistan National Movement submitted a petition to the United Nations Special Committee on Decolonization (C-24) requesting that East Turkistan be inscribed as a Non-Self-Governing Territory and that the People's Republic of China be designated an occupying power. The ETGE described it as the first time China had been formally challenged as a colonial power before a UN body, and Hudayar stated that "decolonization and the restoration of our independence is the only effective guarantee of our people's survival."

== Advocating for recognition of the Uyghur genocide ==
Hudayar spent numerous years extensively advocating for official recognition of the Uyghur genocide by the EU, the United Nations, and countries around the world, and referred to it as a "21st century Holocaust." On 6 July 2020, the East Turkistan Government in Exile and the East Turkistan National Awakening Movement under Hudayar's leadership filed a formal legal complaint at the International Criminal Court against Chinese officials for genocide and other crimes against humanity against Uyghurs and other Turkic peoples. During the last weeks of the Trump Administration, he sent a letter thanking the U.S. Government and the Trump Administration for "everything they have done for East Turkistan and its people" and urging Secretary Pompeo to "seal his legacy" by formally recognizing the Uyghur genocide. On 19 January 2021, U.S. Secretary of State Mike Pompeo declared that China was committing an "ongoing" genocide against Uyghurs. Before that designation, the East Turkistan Government in Exile and the East Turkistan National Awakening Movement, both led by Hudayar, were the only Uyghur groups to have publicly advocated for recognition of the Uyghur genocide.

Hudayar continued to lobby the U.S. Congress in subsequent years, including in support of the Uyghur Policy Act, which the House of Representatives passed on 2 September 2025 and sent to the Senate. By 2026 the ETGE was framing the genocide as having entered its thirteenth year and shifting its emphasis from a human-rights framework to a decolonization one.

== East Turkistan Government-in-Exile ==
Following Hudayar's speech at the Committee on the Present Danger, the self-proclaimed East Turkistan Government-in-Exile appointed Salih Hudayar as their Ambassador to the United States. As Ambassador, Hudayar continued to advocate for Uyghurs' human rights and East Turkistan independence. In an interview, Hudayar claimed to Fox News that China was harvesting the organs of Uyghurs. On 11 November 2019, Hudayar was elected as Prime Minister of the East Turkistan Government-in-Exile at its 8th General Assembly. The next day, the East Turkistan National Awakening Movement held a press conference where they released nearly 500 coordinates of alleged concentration camps, prisons, and labor camps. Later that afternoon, Hudayar led a demonstration to commemorate the independence of the former East Turkistan Republics and to bring attention to what he described as a genocide of Uyghurs and other Turkic peoples. In an interview with NPR, Hudayar stated that Uyghurs and other Turkic peoples in East Turkistan want independence, and that the East Turkistan Government in Exile does not consider itself "separatist" because "you can't separate from something you don't belong to."

In March 2020, Salih Hudayar led an East Turkistan delegation and held meetings with numerous Senators and Representatives. During his meeting with Representative Ted Yoho, Hudayar asked him to deliver a speech on East Turkistan at the US House of Representatives. Congressman Ted Yoho described East Turkistan as an "occupied country" and condemned China for its alleged genocide of Uyghurs, Kazakhs, Kyrgyz and other Turkic peoples. Hudayar condemned the "slave labor" of Uyghurs and other Turkic peoples and accused China of colonizing East Turkistan and enslaving the Uyghurs and other Turkic peoples. In April 2020, Hudayar appeared as a special guest on Steve Bannon's War Room: Pandemic and criticized Muslim countries and leaders for remaining silent on China's alleged atrocities against Turkic Muslims in Xinjiang.

He served as Prime Minister until the ETGE's 9th General Assembly in November 2023, when he became Minister of Foreign Affairs and Security.

== International Criminal Court Complaint ==
On 6 July 2020, the East Turkistan Government in Exile (ETGE) and the East Turkistan National Awakening Movement filed a complaint urging the International Criminal Court (ICC) to investigate and prosecute Chinese officials for genocide and crimes against humanity. Salih Hudayar told Radio Free Asia's Chinese service that "for too long we have been oppressed by China and its Communist Party and we have suffered so much that the genocide of our people can be no longer ignored." On 9 July 2020, the US Government sanctioned three senior Chinese officials, including Xinjiang Party Secretary Chen Quanguo and Zhu Hailun, who were among the officials named in the complaint to the ICC. Hudayar told Radio Free Asia that the East Turkistan Government in Exile welcomed the sanctions and that the Chinese officials should be put on trial like the Nazis during the Nuremberg trials. The ICC prosecutor requested further evidence in December 2020 and the matter has not advanced to a formal investigation, which Hudayar has attributed to geopolitical pressure.

== Political views ==
Hudayar advocates full independence for East Turkistan and rejects autonomy within China as inadequate, arguing in published commentary that autonomy functions as a mask for occupation and that only restored independence can end the genocide. He has criticized what he calls the silence of Muslim-majority states on the treatment of Uyghurs, attributing it largely to economic ties with Beijing.

Hudayar has sharply distanced the independence movement from the Turkistan Islamic Party (TIP). He contends that the TIP is a creation and proxy of Chinese intelligence, and argues that China has exploited the group's existence to demonize Uyghurs as terrorists and to undermine the East Turkistan independence movement.

== Transnational repression ==
Hudayar has been both a target and an outspoken critic of Chinese transnational repression. He has said that more than 100 of his relatives in East Turkistan have been detained in what he describes as retaliation for his activism abroad. He has also accused China of intelligence operations directed at the East Turkistan independence movement.

Hudayar has also accused Chinese intelligence of working to infiltrate and influence Uyghur organizations in order to undermine the East Turkistan independence movement. In April 2025, after Swedish authorities arrested Dilshat Reshit, a spokesperson of the World Uyghur Congress (WUC), on suspicion of spying on Uyghurs for China, Hudayar and the ETGE called for an international investigation into Chinese infiltration of Uyghur diaspora organizations.

== See also ==
- East Turkestan independence movement
- East Turkistan National Awakening Movement
- East Turkistan Government-in-Exile
