= Abdulahat Nur =

Uyghur independence activist (born 1967)

- ئابدۇلاھات نۇر
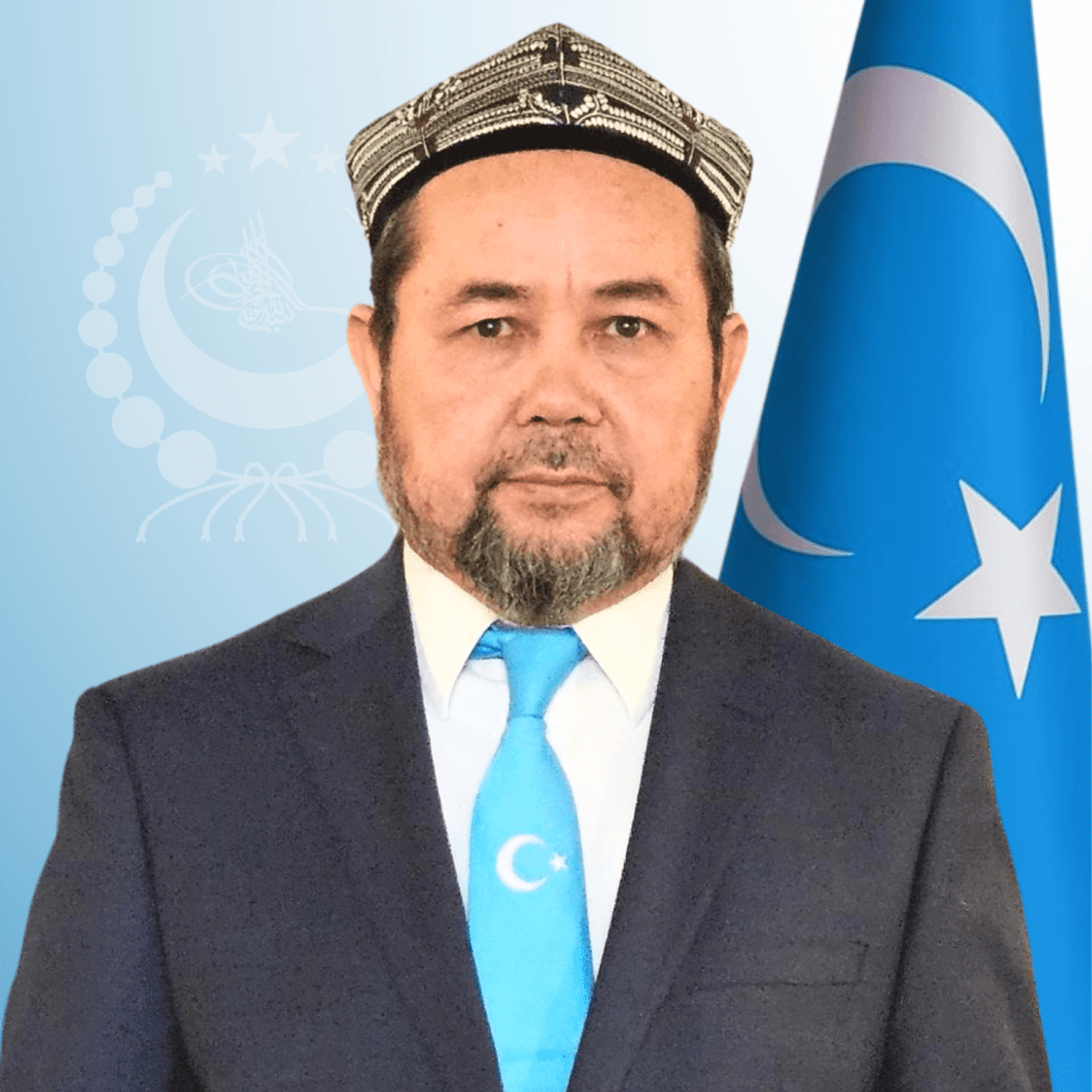
- Official portrait, 2023

Prime Minister of the East Turkistan Government-in-Exile
- Incumbent
- Assumed office 11 November 2023
- Preceded by: Salih Hudayar

4th Vice President of the East Turkistan Government-in-Exile
- In office 11 November 2019 – 11 November 2023
- Preceded by: Hizirbek Gayretullah
- Succeeded by: Sayragul Sauytbay

President of the Alberta Uyghur Cultural Society
- Incumbent
- Assumed office 2018

Minister of Religious and Endowment Affairs of the East Turkistan Government-in-Exile
- In office 30 October 2018 – 30 June 2019

Personal details
- Born: 10 June 1967 (age 59) Maralbexi County, Xinjiang, China
- Children: 7
- Education: Kashgar Khanliq Medris
- Website: East Turkistan Government in Exile

Abdulahat Nur (Uyghur: ئابدۇلاھات نۇر; born 10 June 1967) is a Canadian Uyghur politician and East Turkistan independence leader. He has served as the Prime Minister of the East Turkistan Government-in-Exile (ETGE) since 11 November 2023. Previously, he served as Vice President of the ETGE from 2019 to 2023 and as Minister for Religious and Endowment Affairs from October 2018 to June 2019. Nur is also the President of the Alberta Uyghur Cultural Society since 2018. He also works as a school bus driver in Edmonton, Alberta.

== Early life and education ==
Abdulahat Nur was born on 10 June 1967 in Maralbexi County, Xinjiang (referred to as East Turkistan by Nur). As a child, he experienced harassment from Chinese officials on account of his religion and ethnicity, and left the state school system to attend an underground national school where the Uyghur language and history were taught. In the late 1980s he moved to Kashgar for higher education, studying at the Kashgar Khanliq Medris, and later became a teacher himself. As a teacher, Nur taught students about the region's distinct language, culture, and history, including the position that the area was not historically part of China. He was subsequently blacklisted by the authorities and arrested. According to one account he was imprisoned for three years from 1990 before being released for lack of evidence; he has described overcrowded detention conditions, inadequate food, and pressure to abandon his religion and identity.

== Flight and exile ==
Nur fled his homeland for Kyrgyzstan in 1997, but said Chinese intelligence continued to pursue and threaten him there. He moved on to Turkey in 1999. After approaching the United Nations office in Ankara, he was recognized as a political refugee and resettled in Canada in 2001. His wife was able to leave China and join him in 2005, and the couple had four daughters in Canada.

Three children from before his exile remained in East Turkistan in the care of their maternal grandparents. Nur has said Chinese intelligence agents pressured the couple to return, threatening the children's safety. In 2006, the three children were found in wells near their grandparents' home; the eldest daughter survived but the other two died. Nur believes the deaths were not accidental and were linked to agents acting on behalf of the Chinese authorities. He has said he has had no contact with his surviving daughter or extended family in East Turkistan since 2017.

== Career in Canada ==
Nur resides in Edmonton, Alberta, where he has worked as a school bus driver for more than two decades, transporting students. He became executive director, and later president, of the Alberta Uyghur Cultural Society, and is actively involved in Uyghur community organizations and advocacy.

== Political leadership and advocacy ==
Nur has been a key figure in the East Turkistan independence movement. He served as Minister of Religious and Endowment Affairs of the East Turkistan Government-in-Exile (ETGE) from 30 October 2018 to 30 June 2019. From 2019 to 2023, he was Vice President of the East Turkistan Government-in-Exile. Nur's advocacy in the West began earlier. In July 2009, he protested in Calgary against ethnic violence in Xinjiang, calling for Canadian and UN intervention to protect Uyghurs.

In July 2020, as Vice President of the ETGE, Nur supported the submission of evidence to the International Criminal Court (ICC) accusing Chinese officials, including Xi Jinping, of genocide and crimes against humanity against Uyghurs.

In September 2022, Nur, as vice president, condemned US President Joe Biden and Turkish President Recep Tayyip Erdoğan for inadequately addressing Uyghur issues at the UN General Assembly.

On 11 November 2023, Nur was elected as the Prime Minister of the East Turkistan Government-in-Exile at its 9th General Assembly. Since November 2023, as Prime Minister of the ETGE, Nur has led global efforts to decolonize East Turkistan and achieve its independence.

In April 2025, as Prime Minister, Nur urged newly elected Canadian Prime Minister Mark Carney to recognize the Uyghur genocide, acknowledge East Turkistan as occupied territory, resettle 10,000 Uyghur refugees, and facilitate the release of Canadian citizen Huseyin Celil.

In September 2025, Nur announced global protests on 12 October to mark 75 years of Chinese occupation, condemning ongoing genocide and calling for international action.

In January 2026, Nur condemned the Organisation of Islamic Cooperation (OIC) visit to China, accusing it of legitimizing genocide. In a New Year's address, he pressed the UN and states to confront occupation, genocide, and denial of self-determination.

In May 2026, Nur was the subject of profiles in Canadian and US outlets highlighting the contrast between his work as an Edmonton school bus driver and his role as prime minister in exile. He called on more nations to join Canada, the United States, and the United Kingdom in censuring China, and outlined the exile government's strategy of seeking UN recognition of East Turkistan as a non-self-governing territory and achieving independence through the Declaration on the Granting of Independence to Colonial Countries and Peoples. He also pointed to the region's economic significance, including its share of global aluminum production and its links to international supply chains. In an interview he called for the United States to treat East Turkistan as it treats Tibet by recognizing it as occupied, to appoint a special envoy for East Turkistan, and to support the exile government, arguing that an independent East Turkistan would weaken China's Belt and Road Initiative and supply critical minerals to Western allies.
