= Kashi University =

University in Kashgar, Xinjiang, China

Kashgar University

Location
- Kashgar, Xinjiang, China

Information
- Type: Public
- Established: 1962; 64 years ago
- Staff: 1,075
- Faculty: 827
- Enrollment: About 12,000
- Website: www.ksu.edu.cn

Kashi University (Chinese: 喀什大学; pinyin: Kāshí Dàxué; Uyghur: قەشقەر ئۇنىۋېر سىتېتى), formerly Kashgar University and Kashgar Normal College (Chinese: 喀什师范学院), is a university in Kashgar, Xinjiang, China.

== History ==
The university is the westernmost university in China. The school was founded in 1962 and was formerly known as Xinjiang Kashgar Teachers College, then Kashgar Normal College, and finally on April 28, 2015 the name was changed to Kashgar University as it was upgraded to university status.
