= Ghulam Osman Yaghma =

Uyghur independence activist, writer, and poet (born 1956)

Ghulam Osman Yaghma Ghulam Zulpiqar
- غۇلام ئوسمان ياغما
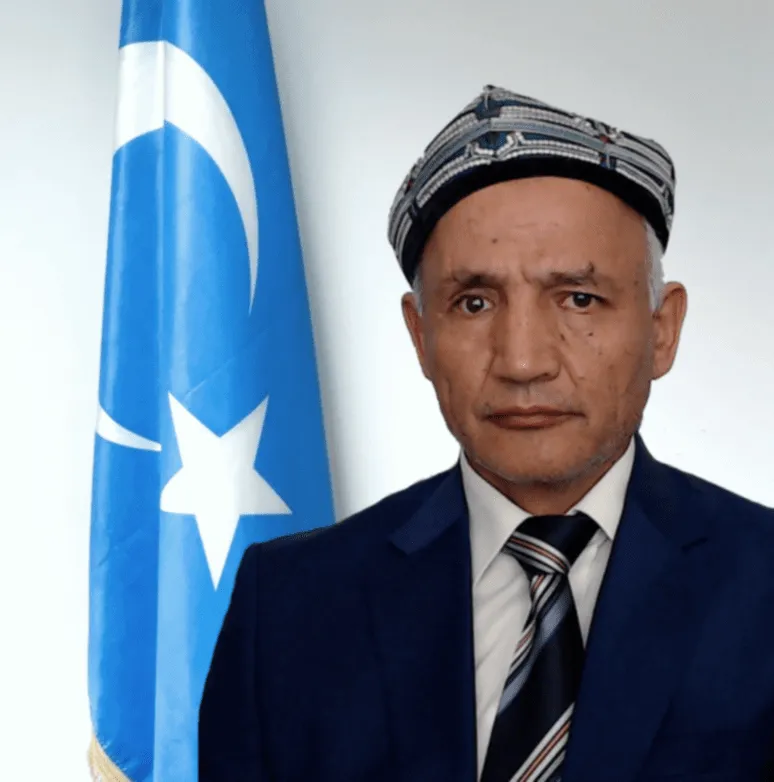
- Yaghma in 2019

(East Turkestan) 3th President of the East Turkistan Government-in-Exile
- In office 11 November 2019 – 12 November 2023
- Preceded by: Ahmatjan Osman
- Succeeded by: Mamtimin Ala

Personal details
- Born: 16 August 1956 (age 70) Artush, Xinjiang, China
- Occupation: Independence leader, political activist, poet and writer
- Website: Official Website (East-Turkistan.net)

Ghulam Osman Yaghma (Uyghur: غۇلام ئوسمان; born 16 August 1956 in Artush) is a Canadian Uyghur politician, independence leader, writer, and poet who served as the President of the East Turkistan Government-in-Exile from November 2019 to November 2023.

== Early life ==
Ghulam Osman Yaghma was born in the city of Artush, Xinjiang. Upon finishing high school, he was barred from obtaining post-secondary education by the Chinese government due to his past participation in creating an independence organization "to liberate East Turkistan from Chinese occupation". He served as an instructor of modern Uyghur language, literature and estelistics.

== Life in exile ==
Yaghma fled East Turkistan (Xinjiang) to Kyrgyzstan on 30 April 1996, two days after China launched its "Strike Hard campaign" against separatism. He later fled Central Asia to Turkey in 1999 after he was not permitted to stay in Central Asia. In Turkey he appealed to the United Nations High Commission for Refugees office in Turkey and after three years, in March 2002, Yaghma was given asylum in Canada. Yaghma is fluent in Uyghur and Turkish, and proficient in English and Chinese. He is married and has 8 children, two of which are allegedly incarcerated in the Xinjiang re-education camps. He resides in Edmonton, Canada.

== East Turkistan Government in Exile ==
Ghulam Osman Yaghma was re-elected as the President of the East Turkistan Government-in-Exile on 11 November 2019 at the government in exile's 8th General Assembly in Washington, DC. He had previously been elected president following the impeachment of the former president in a Special Parliamentary Session in Mugla, Turkey in October 2018. He is the third President of the government in exile since its formation in 2004. Starting in 2009, he had previously served as the Strategic Advisor to the East Turkistan Government-in-Exile. He was elected as the Deputy Prime Minister of the East Turkistan Government-in-Exile at the 7th General Assembly held in Tokyo, Japan from 12 November to 15 November.

== Literary works ==
Ghulam Osman Yaghma, using the pen name "G.O. Zulpiqar" has authored numerous non-fiction books, novels, articles, and poems. "Lost Treasure", "He Is Still in Battle", "Secret Love", "Dulled Sword", "Sound", "Sigh", "The road leads to heaven", "Infatuation" and "Reflection" are among the most read fiction novels written by him.
