= East Turkistan Government in Exile =

US-based exile political organization

Government in Exile of the Republic of East Turkistan شەرقىي تۈركىستان جۇمھۇرىيىتى سۈرگۈندى ھۆكۈمىتى (Uyghur) Sherqiy Türkistan Jumhuriyiti Sürgündi Hökümiti
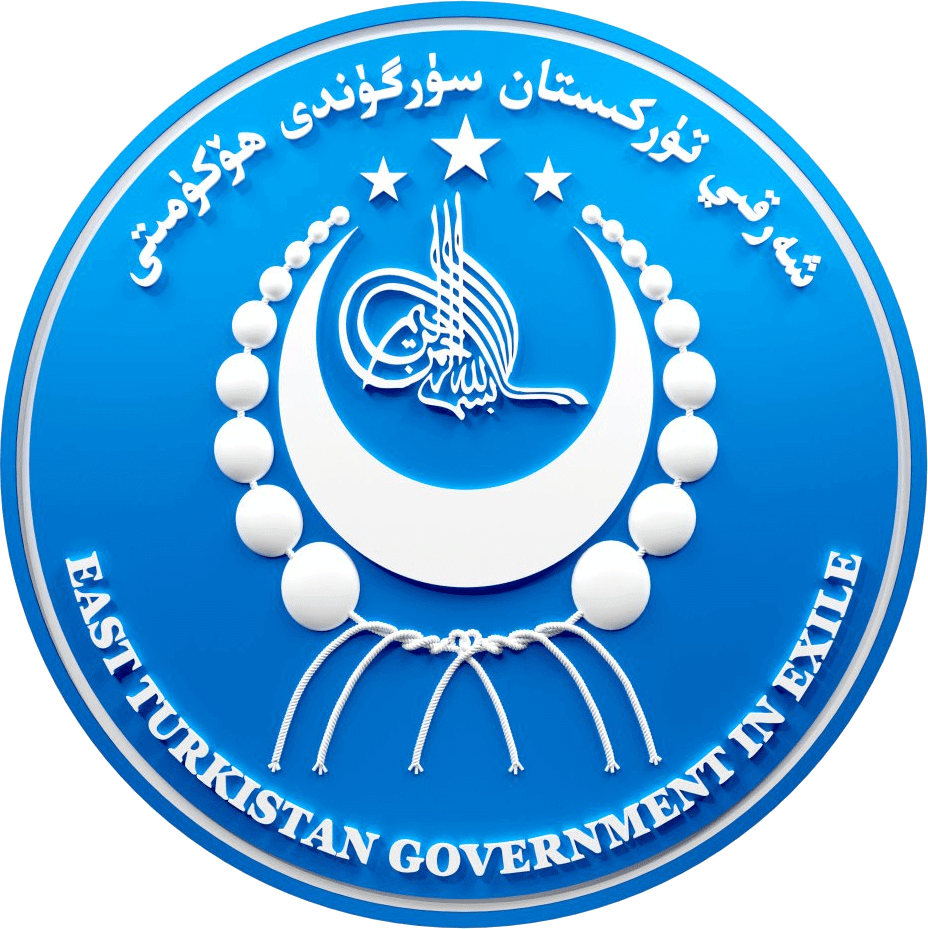
- Flag Emblem
- Motto: شەرقىي تۈركىستان ۋە ئۇنىڭ خەلقىگە ئەركىنلىك ۋە مۇستەقىللىقنى ئەسلىگە كەلتۈرۈش "Restoring Independence for East Turkistan and its people"
- Anthem: قۇرتۇلۇش مارشى; Qurtulush Yolida "On the Path to Salvation"
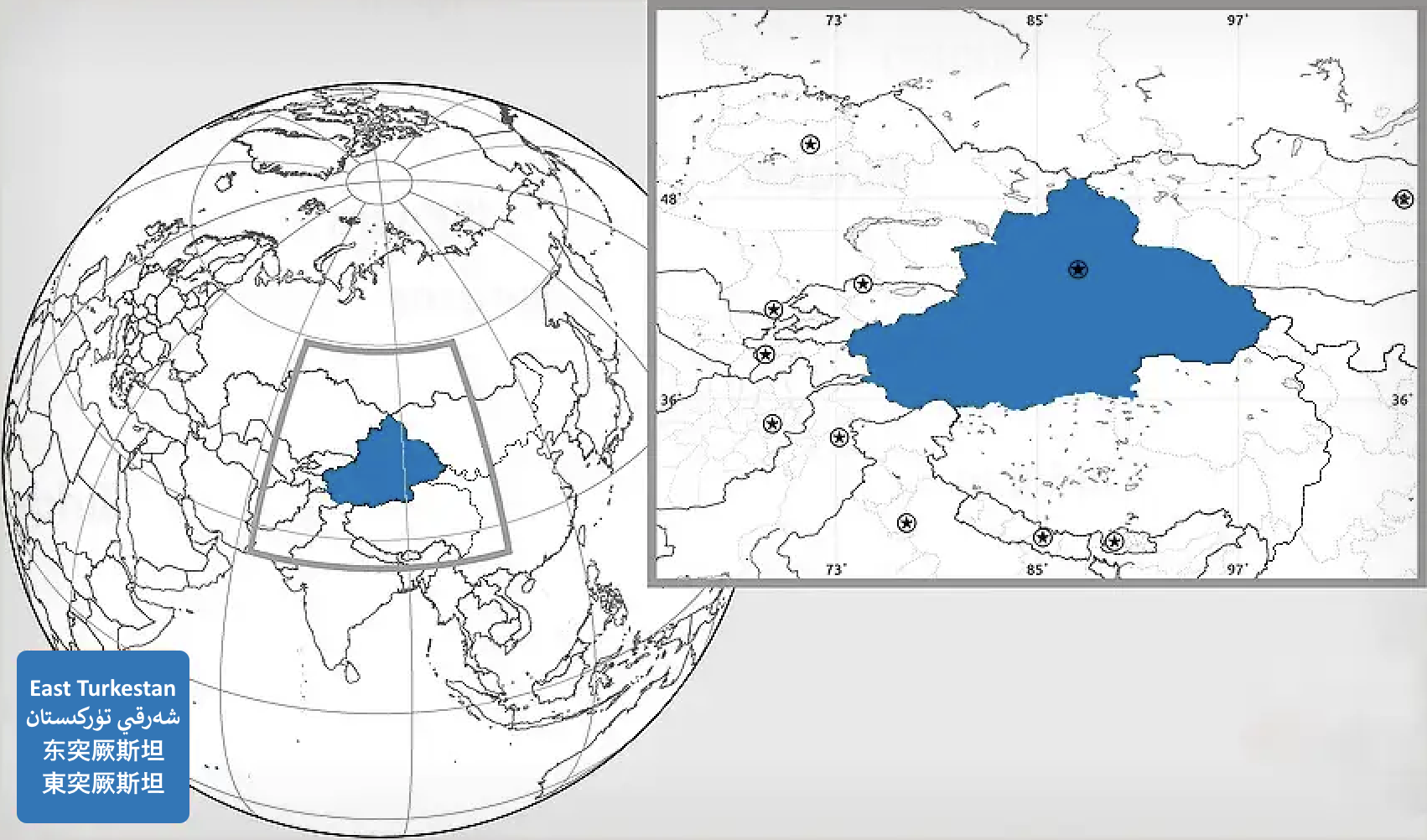
- The region over which the ETGE claims sovereignty as East Turkistan
- Status: Government-in-exile
- Capital and largest city: Ürümqi (claimed)
- Headquarters: Suite 741, 20 F Street NW, Washington, D.C., United States
- Official languages: Uyghur (de jure)
- Religion: Islam
- Demonym: East Turkistani
- Type: Government in exile

Government
  - President: Mamtimin Ala
  - Vice President: Sayragul Sauytbay
  - Prime Minister: Abdulahat Nur
- Legislature: Parliament in Exile
- Establishment: September 14, 2004
  - Claimed exile: December 22, 1949
- Website east-turkistan.net

The East Turkistan Government in Exile (Note: Uyghur: شەرقىي تۈركىستان سۈرگۈندى ھۆكۈمىتى, romanized: Sherqiy Türkistan Sürgündi Hökümiti) (abbreviated as ETGE or ETGIE), officially the Government in Exile of the Republic of East Turkistan, (Note: Uyghur: شەرقىي تۈركىستان جۇمھۇرىيىتى سۈرگۈندى ھۆكۈمىتى, romanized: Sherqiy Türkistan Jumhuriyiti Sürgündi Hökümiti) is a political organization established and headquartered in Washington, D.C. by Uyghurs, Kazakhs, and other peoples from East Turkistan (Xinjiang). The ETGE claims to be the sole legitimate organization and a parliamentary-based government in exile representing East Turkistan and its people on the international stage.

The formation of the ETGE was declared inside Room HC-6 of the U.S. Capitol Building, though the territories it claims are unrecognized by the United States. The People's Republic of China has sternly opposed the East Turkistan Government in Exile since its creation in September 2004.

The ETGE has been described by scholars as a prominent fringe Uyghur organization that advocates for radical methods and calling for full independence driven by religious and ethnic motives. The organization is among several Uyghur groups that demand total independence in contrast to other organizations that advocate for more autonomy and democracy. It has been called the "most prominent Uyghur organization outside the WUC".

In later years, the ETGE has been actively involved in international advocacy, including events in the U.S. Congress, UK Parliament, Japanese Parliament, Canadian Parliament, and support from members of the European Parliament regarding its genocide complaint to the International Criminal Court.” In May 2026, the ETGE filed a formal petition with the UN Special Committee on Decolonization seeking East Turkistan's listing as a Non-Self-Governing Territory and the application of the Declaration on the Granting of Independence to Colonial Countries and Peoples to East Turkistan.

== Formation ==
Numerous Uyghur organisations representing the Uyghur movement in exile formed around the world from the 1980s to early 2000s but were disorganised and disunited. In April 2004, two such organizations, the Eastern Turkistan National Congress and the World Uyghur Youth Congress, merged to form the World Uyghur Congress (WUC).

A radical pro-independence minority of the Eastern Turkistan National Congress refused to join the merger and instead established the East Turkistan Government in Exile in Washington D.C. in 2004. They started on the fringes of Uyghur diaspora organizations (including the East Turkistan Liberation Organisation and East Turkestan Islamic Movement) that advocates for "more radical forms of ideological and armed struggle" in contrast to the more moderate methods used by the World Uyghur Congress to influence the Chinese government. In particular, the East Turkistan Government in Exile rejected the autonomy desired by the World Uyghur Congress and instead advocated for independence.

The East Turkistan Government in Exile was formally declared on September 14, 2004, in room HC-6 of the United States Capitol in Washington, D.C. by members of the global East Turkistani community under the leadership of Anwar Yusuf Turani. Ahmat Igambardi, who had previously been the chairman of the first East Turkistan National Congress created in Istanbul, Turkey in 1992, was elected by the delegates present as president and Turani was elected as Prime Minister.

The East Turkistan Government in Exile claimed to be the "sole organ of the Eastern Turkestan Republic" just four months after the formation of the World Uyghur Congress, threatening the World Uyghur Congress's claim to being the highest Uyghur representative organization and leading to immediate tensions between the two groups. Dilshat Reshit, a co-founder and spokesperson of the WUC, publicly objected to the ETGE's formation, questioning its representativeness in an interview with BBC Chinese at the time. He was later arrested in Sweden in April 2025 on suspicion of espionage for China. Following the WUC's objections, some of its supporters expressed their concerns about the ETGE on the bulletin board of the Uyghur American Association, which is affiliated with the World Uyghur Congress. They wrote statements accusing Anwar Yusuf Turani of acting under the instructions of the Chinese government, particularly in relation to the strategy of dividing dissident organizations." Turani himself was later impeached by the ETGE's Parliament in 2006 for violating its constitution.

== Positions ==
The East Turkistan Government in Exile has been described by scholars as one of several "Uyghur groups advocating radical forms of ideological and armed struggle including terrorist activities". Scholars describe the East Turkistan Government in Exile as a prominent Uyghur organization on the fringes of the East Turkestan independence movement that is marginalized in western politics.

Depending on how large a particular speaker defines the named region, "East Turkistan" has been administered at least in part by the People's Republic of China (PRC) as the Xinjiang Uyghur Autonomous Region, a situation that the ETGE considers an illegitimate military occupation. The position of the ETGE is that "East Turkistan and its people have a long history of independence". The ETGE does not consider themselves as "separatists" because they believe that, "you can't separate from something you don't belong to." The position of the PRC holds that the integration of Xinjiang into the PRC in 1949 was a "peaceful liberation", and that the region has "long been a part of China".

The ETGE describes itself as democratically elected parliamentary-based exile government that seeks to end "China's occupation and colonization" of East Turkistan, which overlaps with what China calls the Xinjiang Uyghur Autonomous Region, and seeks to "restore the independence of East Turkistan" which would take the form of a democratic parliamentary republic with protections for civil liberties for all people groups of the region.

== Leadership ==
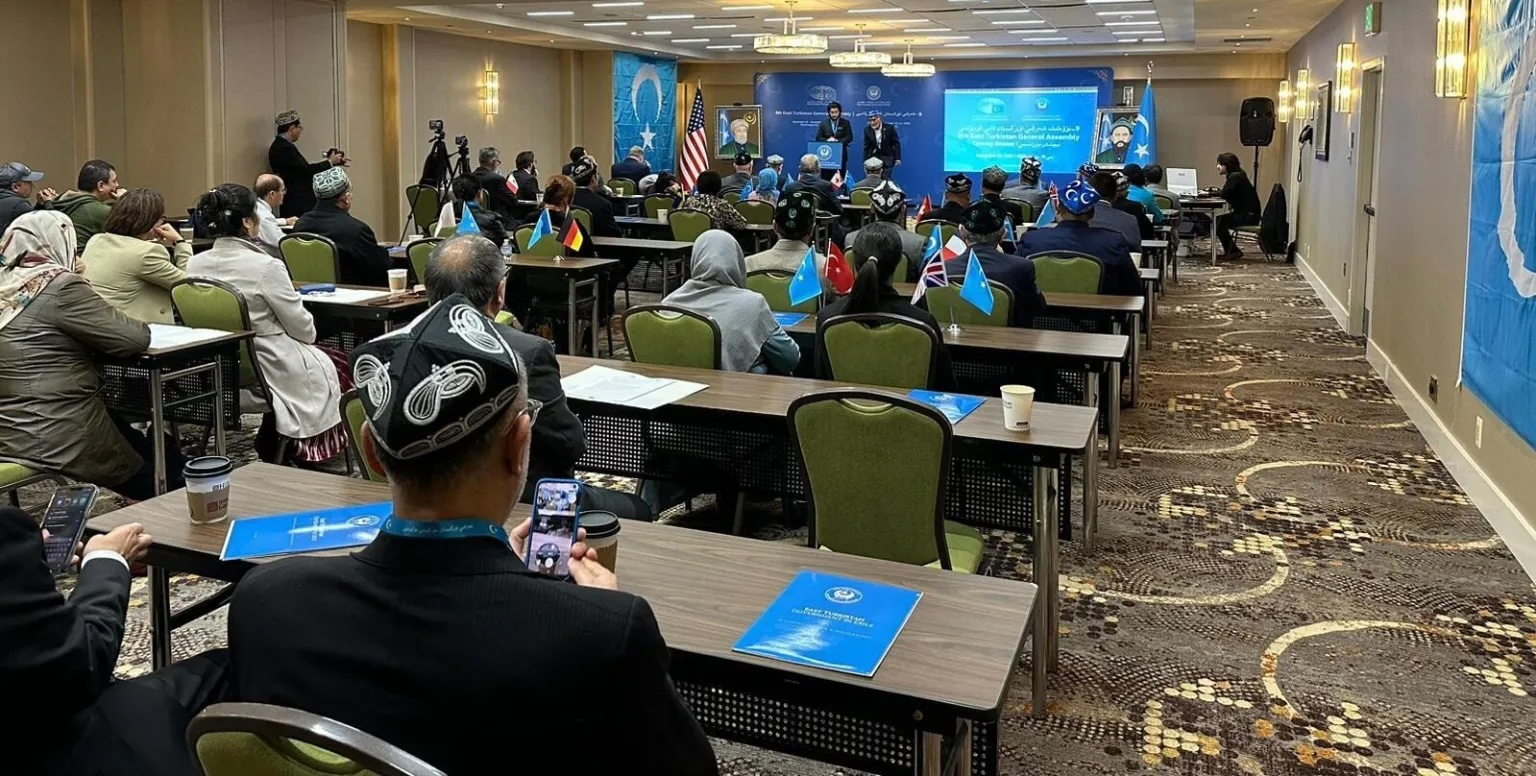
Opening Session of the 9th East Turkistan General Assembly in Washington, DC on November 10, 2023

=== Government leadership ===
As the Government in Exile is made up of elected representatives from East Turkistani/Uyghur diaspora communities in over 13 countries, its leaders are based in a number of countries. The present leadership took office on November 12, 2023, following elections at the ETGE's 9th General Assembly in Washington, D.C.

Position	Name	Location
President	Mamtimin Ala	Australia
Prime Minister	Abdulahat Nur	Canada
Vice President	Sayragul Sauytbay	Sweden
Minister of Foreign Affairs & Security	Salih Hudayar	USA
Interior Minister	Qurbanjan Hisamidin	Norway
Spokesperson (Uyghur) & Cabinet Secretary	Perhat Abduweli	Norway
Finance Minister	Ibrahim Emin	Belgium
Minister of Education & Religious Affairs	Adil Ablimit	Netherlands
Minister of Information & Communications	Jurat Obul	USA
Minister of Family, Women, Youth & Human Rights	Gulvaryam Tokhtiyeva	Kazakhstan

=== Parliamentary leadership ===
The Parliament is the legislative branch of the ETGE. As the Government in Exile's Parliament is made up of 60 members representing diaspora communities in 13 countries, its leaders are based in a number of countries. The present leadership was announced on November 11, 2023, following elections at the ETGE's 9th General Assembly in Washington, D.C. The Parliament is also made up of six committees that help oversee the government's different ministries.

Position	Name	Location
Speaker (chairman) of the Parliament	Yarmemet Baratjan	USA
Deputy Speaker (Co-chairman) of the Parliament	Abduweli Adem	Turkiye
Parliamentary Secretary	Elijan Emet	Belgium
Chairman of the Committee on Foreign and Legal Affairs	Mirqedir Mirzat	France
Chairman of the Committee on Diaspora and Internal Affairs	Kurbanjan Hisamdin	Norway
Chairwoman of the Committee on Communications, Media, and Information	Fatmagul Çakan	Turkiye
Chairman of the Committee on Culture, Education, Religious Affairs and Research	Abdullah Khodja	France
Co-chair of the Committee on Culture, Education, Religious Affairs and Research	Abdumutellip Ibrahim	France
Chairwoman of the Committee on Family, Women, Youth, and Human Rights	Amannissa Mukhlis	USA

== Previous leadership ==
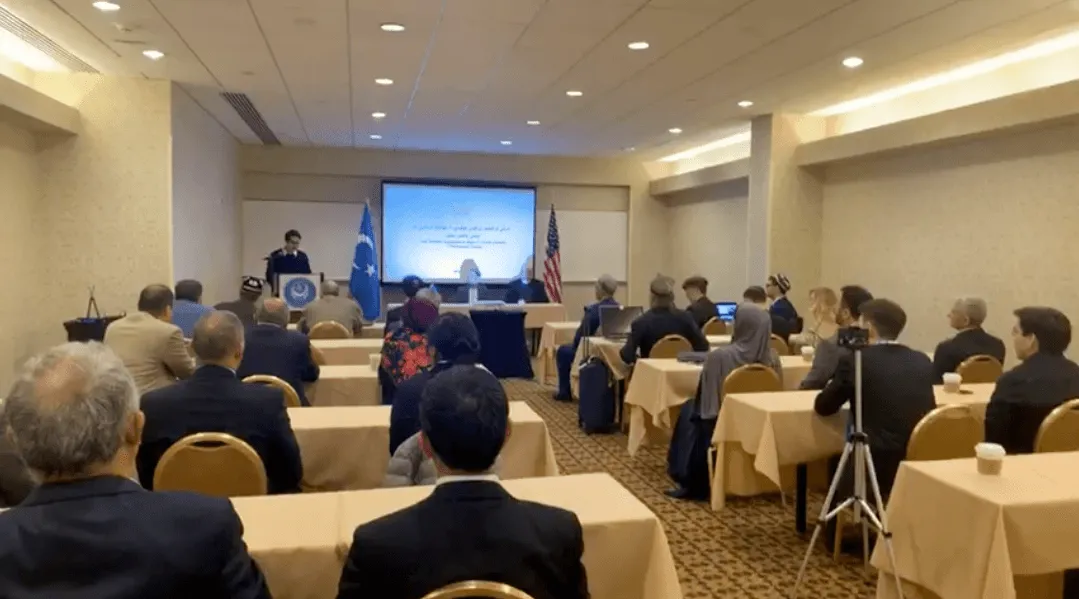
Opening of the ETGE's 8th General Assembly, November 10, 2019

=== 2019 – 2023 ===
Position	Name	Location
President	Ghulam Osman Yaghma	Canada
Vice President	Abdulahat Nur	Canada
Prime Minister	Salih Hudayar	USA
Deputy Prime Minister	Mirqedir Mirzat	France
Speaker (chairman) of Parliament	Osmancan Tursun	Germany

=== 2015 – 2019 ===
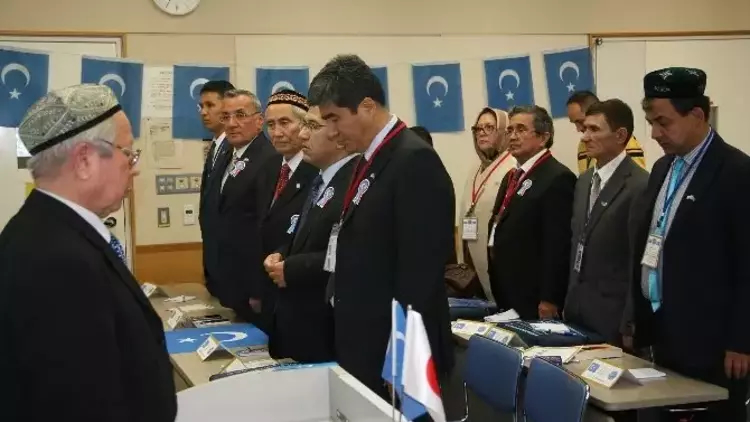
Members of the East Turkistan Government in Exile Convene at the 7th East Turkistan General Assembly in Tokyo on November 11, 2015

Position	Name	Location
President	Ahmatjan Osman (impeached in October 2018)	Canada
President	Ghulam Osman Yaghma (Acting; October 2018 – November 2019)	Canada
Prime Minister	Ismail Cengiz (impeached in April 2019)	Turkiye
Prime Minister	Abdulahat Nur (Acting; April 2019 – November 2019)	Canada
Vice President	Hizirbek Gayretullah	Turkiye
Speaker (chairman) of Parliament	Koresh Atahan	Germany

=== 2009 – 2015 ===
Position	Name	Location
President	Ahmet Igemberdi	Australia
Vice President	Hizirbek Gayretullah	Turkiye
Prime Minister	Ismail Cengiz	Turkiye
Speaker (chairman) of Parliament	Sultan Mahmut Kashgari	Turkiye

=== 2006 – 2009 ===
Position	Name	Location
President	Ahmet Igemberdi	Australia
Prime Minister	Damiyan Rehmet	Australia
Vice President	Abdvueli Can	Turkiye
Speaker (chairman) of Parliament	Sultan Mahmut Kashgari	Turkiye

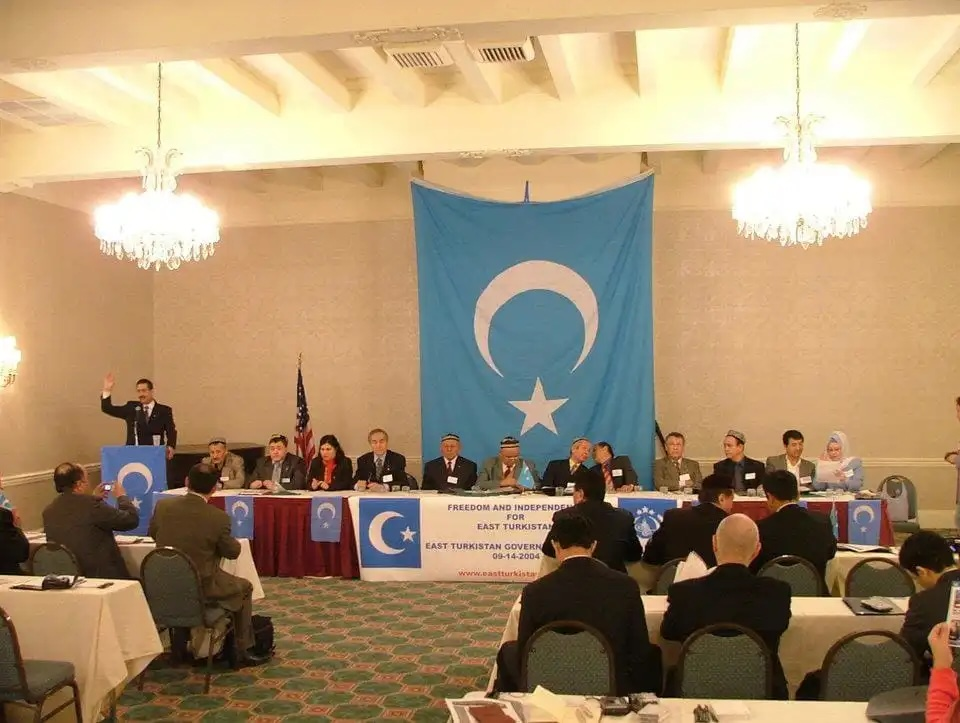
The Formal Declaration of the East Turkistan Government in Exile, Held in Room HC-6 of the United States Capitol on September 14, 2004

=== 2004 – 2006 ===
Position	Name	Location
President	Ahmet Igemberdi	Australia
Prime Minister	Anwar Yusuf Turani (impeached in 2006)	USA
Prime Minister	Damiyan Rehmet (Acting)	Australia
Vice President	Abduveli Can	Turkiye
Speaker (chairman) of Parliament	Sultan Mahmut Kashgari	Turkiye

== Activities ==
Since 2019, the ETGE has participated in international advocacy, including briefings hosted by the U.S. Congress, events in the UK Parliament, the Japanese National Diet, and briefings and consultations with members of the Canadian Parliament. 38 Members of the European Parliament and more than 60 parliamentarians from 16 countries affiliated with the Inter-Parliamentary Alliance on China expressed support for the East Turkistan Government in Exile's genocide complaint before the International Criminal Court. The ETGE has also lobbied for governments to recognize China's actions in Xinjiang as genocide; its representatives briefed Canadian and U.S. lawmakers prior to resolutions in both countries declaring that Uyghurs and other Turkic peoples were victims of genocide.

On July 14, 2020, the ETGE signed onto a joint letter by 64 Canadian MPs and 20 organizations urging Canadian Prime Minister Justin Trudeau, his deputy Chrystia Freeland and Global Affairs Minister François-Philippe Champagne to sanction PRC and Hong Kong officials "directly responsible for the human rights atrocities happening in Tibet, occupied East Turkestan (Xinjiang), and Hong Kong."

On August 15, 2020, Salih Hudayar the Prime Minister of the ETGE greeted India on its 74th Independence Day and said that "the decades of prolonged Chinese occupation and genocide in East Turkistan has taught us that without independence there is no way to guarantee or ensure even our most basic human rights, freedoms, and our very survival." In a public demonstration, Prime Minister Hudayar urged the United States government and the United Nations to "break their silence and stand up against China."

On August 28, 2020, the ETGE held a global demonstration in Adelaide, Tokyo, Frankfurt, The Hague, Paris, New York City, Washington, D.C., and Edmonton to protest what they claim are China's atrocities against Uyghurs and other Turkic peoples and urged the international community to recognize the alleged atrocities as a genocide while also recognizing "East Turkistan as an occupied country."

=== International Criminal Court case ===
On July 6, 2020, the New York Times and The Wall Street Journal reported that the East Turkistan Government in Exile and the East Turkistan National Awakening Movement filed a complaint with the International Criminal Court, urging it to investigate and prosecute PRC officials for genocide and other crimes against humanity. The complaint is the first attempt to use an international legal forum to challenge China over allegations of extensive human rights abuses against Muslim Turkic people in East Turkistan. The ETGE's Prime Minister, Salih Hudayar, told Radio Free Asia's Chinese service that "for too long we have been oppressed by China and its Communist Party and we have suffered so much that the genocide of our people can be no longer ignored."

On July 9, 2020, the US government sanctioned 3 senior PRC officials including Xinjiang Communist Party Secretary Chen Quanguo and Zhu Hailun, who were among the 30 officials mentioned in the complaint to the ICC. ETGE Prime Minister Salih Hudayar told Radio Free Asia that the ETGE welcomed the sanctions and that Uyghurs wanted real justice. He stated that the PRC officials should be tried for human rights abuses by an international court, citing the example the Nuremberg Trials of high-ranking Nazi Party officials after World War II.

=== Recognition of China's human rights abuse as genocide ===
The East Turkistan National Awakening Movement and the East Turkistan Government in Exile were the first Uyghur groups to refer to China's mass surveillance and internment of the inhabitants of Xinjiang/East Turkistan as a genocide. They have actively lobbied for the U.S. and other countries to declare the policies in Xinjiang as genocide. ETGE and ETNAM held numerous demonstrations, press conferences, and other events urging the world to recognize China's genocide in East Turkistan (Xinjiang). The East Turkistan National Awakening Movement and the East Turkistan Government in Exile filed a complaint urging the International Criminal Court to investigate and prosecute Chinese officials for genocide. The ETGE also successfully lobbied the U.S. Senate to introduce a genocide resolution and urged the U.S. Government to recognize the genocide.

On January 11, 2021, the ETGE made a press statement urging the first Trump Administration to recognize China's actions against Uyghurs and other Turkic peoples in East Turkistan as a genocide before January 20, 2021. On January 19, 2021, the U.S. State Department formally designated China's actions against Uyghurs and other Turkic peoples as genocide. Salih Hudayar, the Prime Minister of the East Turkistan Government in Exile, told The Wall Street Journal that the ETGE had been pushing for the designation for two years and that the ETGE hopes that this designation will lead to real, strong actions to hold China accountable and bring an end to China's genocide.

The ETGE also called on the U.S. Justice Department to enact 18 U.S. Code Section 1091 and prosecute Chinese diplomats, specifically Chinese Ambassador Cui Tiankai, for genocide. The ETGE further urged countries to follow suit and recognize the genocide, it also urged the Biden Administration to "take a more active approach to resolve the East Turkistan issue" by recognizing East Turkistan as an Occupied Country, boycotting the 2022 Winter Olympics in Beijing and meeting with the East Turkistan Government in Exile like the Trump Administration met with the Tibetan Government in Exile.

=== Recognition of East Turkistan ===
The East Turkistan Government in Exile has actively called on the U.S. and other governments and organizations across the globe to recognize East Turkistan as an occupied country. The ETGE also denounces the use of the Chinese term "Xinjiang". On February 20, 2024, the ETGE spearheaded a joint letter from 61 Uyghur organizations around the world addressed to the U.S. Congress. The letter urged the U.S. Congress to pass the Uyghur Policy Act, appoint a Special Coordinator for East Turkistani Issues, and recognize East Turkistan, as well as to resist China's attempts to erase East Turkistan. Notably, the signatures of pro-autonomy groups like the World Uyghur Congress and its affiliates were absent from this joint letter.

=== Recognition of the Circassian genocide ===
On May 18, 2023, the East Turkestan Government in Exile announced its recognition of the Circassian genocide.

=== Petition for Decolonization of East Turkistan ===
On May 5, 2026, the East Turkistan Government in Exile and the East Turkistan National Awakening Movement filed a petition with the United Nations Special Committee on Decolonization (C-24), requesting that East Turkistan be listed as a Non-Self-Governing Territory. The ETGE described the filing as the first formal challenge to China as a colonial power before a UN body, arguing that no legal transfer of sovereignty occurred when Chinese forces entered the territory in 1949.

The 25-page petition asserts that the East Turkistan Republic existed before 1949 and met the statehood criteria of the 1933 Montevideo Convention, namely a permanent population, a defined territory, and a functioning government. It contends that Chinese administration amounts to occupation without consent. The petition cites the 2022 UN Human Rights Office report on Xinjiang, which found that Chinese actions may constitute crimes against humanity, as well as five evidence submissions made to the International Criminal Court since 2020, and China's March 12, 2026 Law on Promoting Ethnic Unity and Progress, which the ETGE characterizes as codifying cultural assimilation policies.

The petition lists eight requests to the UN General Assembly, including designating China as an occupying power, affirming East Turkistan's right to self-determination, applying the Declaration on the Granting of Independence to Colonial Countries and Peoples to East Turkistan, and examining China's role on the Security Council and the decolonization committee. ETGE President Mamtimin Ala stated that more than eighty nations had achieved independence through the decolonization framework and that the peoples of East Turkistan were asserting that same right before the United Nations. ETGE Foreign Minister Salih Hudayar said that decolonization offered the only guarantee for the native population's survival and human rights, and that restoration of independence was the only solution for East Turkistan.

== See also ==
- Turkistan Islamic Party
- East Turkestan independence movement
- East Turkistan National Awakening Movement
- First East Turkestan Republic
- Second East Turkestan Republic
- Central Tibetan Administration
- Inner Mongolian People's Party
