= Aruz =

Persian, Turkic and Urdu prosody

The ʿarūż (Note: Persian: عروض, romanized: 'aruz; Azerbaijani: əruz; Turkish: aruz; Uzbek: aruz; Urdu: عروض, romanized: 'arūz.) (from Arabic عروض ʿarūḍ), also called ʿarūż prosody, is the Persian, Turkic and Urdu prosody, using the ʿarūż meters. (Note: Persian: وزن‌های عروضی, romanized: vazn-hâ-ye 'aruzi; Azerbaijani: əruz vəznləri; Turkish: aruz vezinleri; Uzbek: aruz vaznlari; Urdu: عروض کے اوزان, romanized: 'arūz ke auzān.) The earliest founder of this versification system was Khalil ibn Ahmad. There were 16 meters of ʿarūż at first. Later Persian scholars added 3 more. For example, the Karakhanid long poem Kutadgu Bilig from the 11th century was written using the mutaqārib meter.

== Turkic prosody ==
=== Old Anatolian Turkish ===
According to Erkan Salan,

Rhyme and aruz prosody were considered to be very significant in [Old Anatolian Turkish poetic works]. Indeed, these were a symbol of perfection for the poets of the time. The struggle to observe rhyme and aruz prosody affected Turkish language in various ways. One of the significant effects is observed in the use of suffixes, inflectional suffixes in particular; in many suffixes different usages emerged.

=== Chaghatay ===
As worded by Andras J. E. Bodrogligeti,

Classical Chaghatay was used, above all, in poetry to produce high-level literary works (šiʿr), composed in the Persian-Arabic style with strict observance of the rules of Persian-Arabic prosody (ʿaruż) and the cultural standards of the Timurid courts.
