= Nury Turkel =

Uyghur American lawyer and former U.S. government official

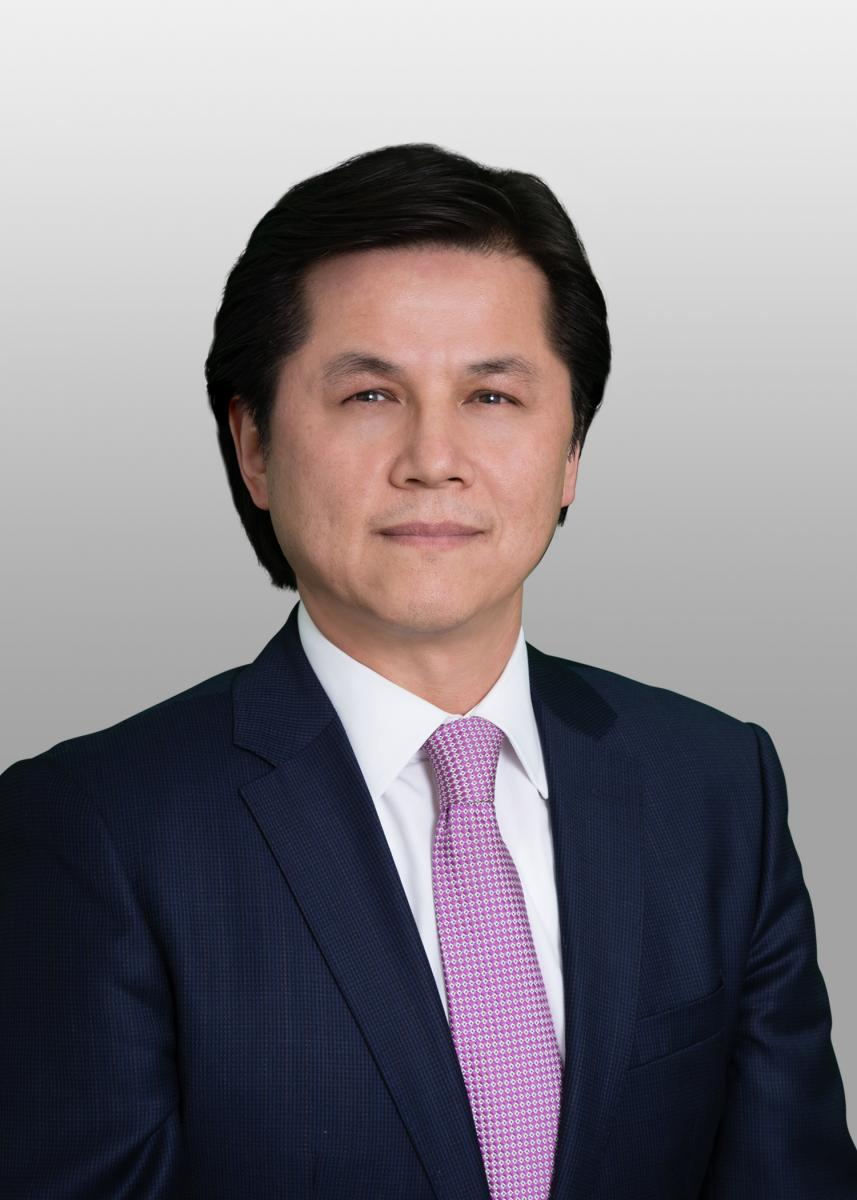

Former Chair of the United States Commission on International Religious Freedom
- In office May 26, 2020 – May 14, 2024

President of the Uyghur American Association
- In office 2004–2006

Personal details
- Born: Kashgar
- Spouse: Nazli Turkel (m. 2007)
- Children: 2
- Education: Northwest A&F University (BA); American University (MA, JD)
- Occupation: Lawyer, public official, human rights advocate
- Known for: First U.S.-educated Uyghur lawyer Former President of the Uyghur American Association; Former Chairman of the Board for the Uyghur Human Rights Project
- Ethnicity: Uyghur

Nury Turkel is an American attorney, author, public official, and foreign policy and national security expert based in Washington, D.C. He is a former chair of the United States Commission on International Religious Freedom, former head of the Uyghur Human Rights Project, and a fellow at the neoconservative Hudson Institute.

Turkel is the first U.S.-educated Uyghur lawyer and the first Uyghur American to be appointed to a political position in the United States. In 2020, he was named to Time's list of the 100 most influential people in the world, and was included among Fortune's 50 Greatest Leaders the following year. He is the author of No Escape: The True Story of China's Genocide of the Uyghurs.

== Early life ==
Turkel was born in a re-education camp in Kashgar during the Cultural Revolution. Turkel's grandfather had been associated with Uyghur nationalists and his mother was interned when she was six months pregnant. Turkel lived in the detention center for the first four months of his life. Turkel's father was a professor and his mother was a businesswoman. He completed his primary and middle school in his homeland. In 1994, he graduated from the Northwest A&F University in Shaanxi Province, China. After residing in Beijing for a year, he left for the United States in 1995 to pursue graduate studies and has not returned to China since. Turkel has a Master of Arts in international relations and a Juris Doctor from American University.

== Career ==
=== Legal career ===
Turkel practiced law in the areas of global trade, regulatory compliance, anti-corruption, export controls, and economic sanctions. At Covington & Burling, he advised multinational companies on corporate compliance, internal investigations, international trade, and U.S. government enforcement matters involving the Foreign Corrupt Practices Act (FCPA), export controls, and economic sanctions.

He later served as compliance counsel at Ericsson, where he worked on global corporate compliance, anti-corruption, export controls, economic sanctions, and business and human rights matters.

=== Public service and think tank work ===
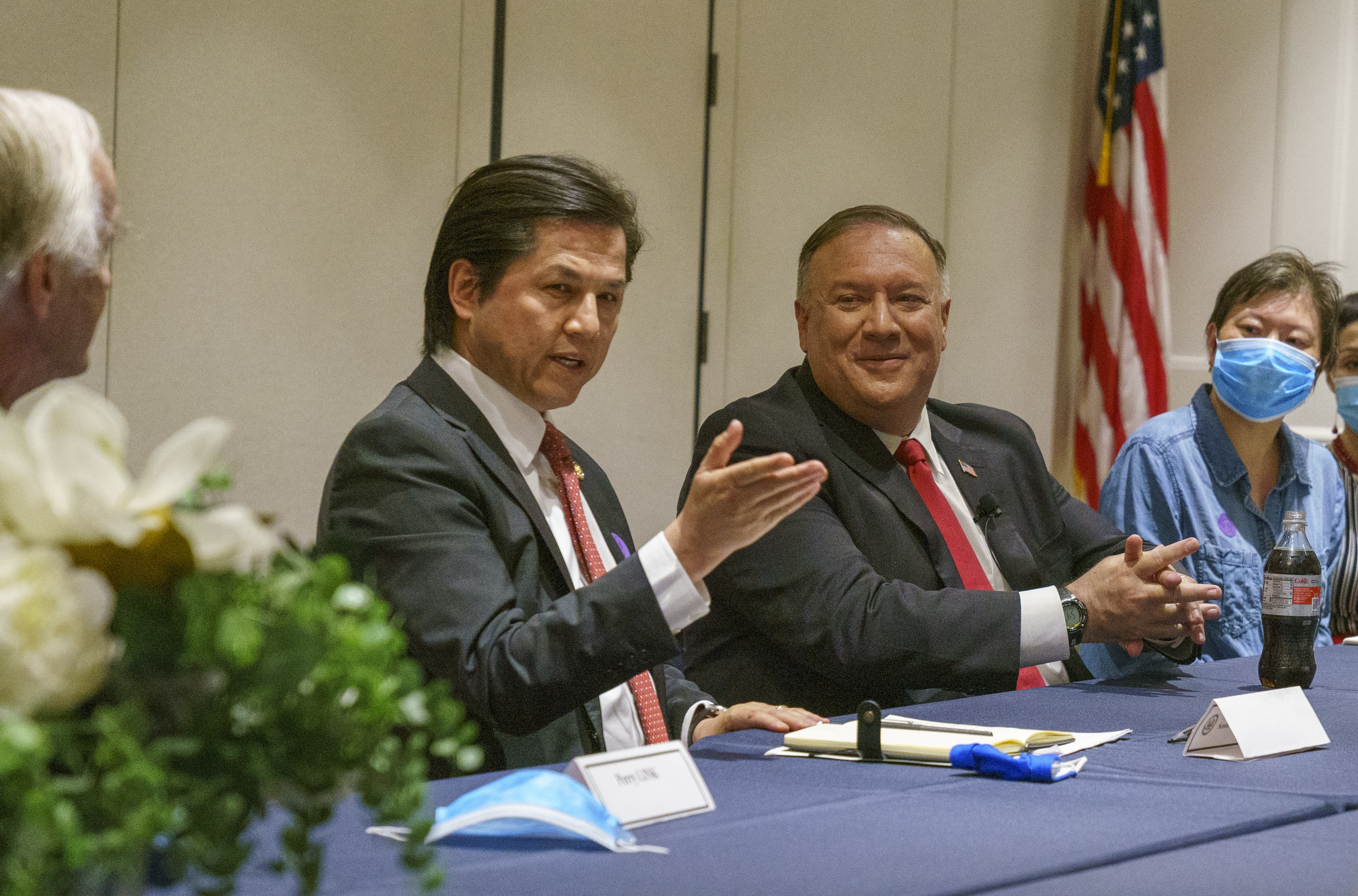
US Secretary of State Michael Pompeo meets with Commissioner Turkel and Chinese dissidents (July 2020)

In May 2020, Turkel was appointed a commissioner of the United States Commission on International Religious Freedom (USCIRF) by then Speaker of the House Nancy Pelosi. He was reappointed in May 2022 and was unanimously elected chair for the 2022–2023 term. Pelosi said of Turkel, "I am confident that he will continue to be a powerful voice for the Uyghur people and for the cause of justice around the world."

Turkel served as a senior fellow on the Hudson Institute.

=== Policy advocacy ===
Turkel co-founded the Uyghur Human Rights Project (UHRP) in 2003 and served as its first executive director and later chairman of the board, a position he held until May 2024. From 2004 to 2006, he served as president of the Uyghur American Association.

Turkel has testified before the United States Congress and congressional commissions on numerous occasions on issues including Uyghur human rights, forced labor, international religious freedom, digital authoritarianism, supply chain security, and U.S.–China relations. His appearances have included testimony before the Congressional-Executive Commission on China, the Tom Lantos Human Rights Commission, the United States House Select Committee on Strategic Competition between the United States and the Chinese Communist Party, and the United States House Committee on Ways and Means.

Beginning in 2018, Turkel advocated for U.S. sanctions targeting Chinese officials and entities implicated in human rights abuses in Xinjiang, including the Xinjiang Production and Construction Corps, and supported passage of the Uyghur Human Rights Policy Act. He also urged Congress to enact the Uyghur Forced Labor Prevention Act (UFLPA), which established a rebuttable presumption that goods produced wholly or in part in Xinjiang are made with forced labor unless proven otherwise. According to The Wire China, Turkel's October 2019 testimony before the Congressional-Executive Commission on China "set off a chain of events" that eventually resulted in enactment of the UFLPA.

Turkel has also written and spoken on issues at the intersection of technology, national security, and U.S.–China strategic competition. His work has addressed artificial intelligence, export controls, digital authoritarianism, supply chain resilience, and emerging technologies. His policy commentary has appeared in The Wall Street Journal and Foreign Policy, and he authored the Hudson Institute policy memorandum AI, National Security, and the Global Technology Race: How US Export Controls Define the Future of Innovation.

In May 2024, NOTUS reported concerns about Turkel's conduct towards women, including complaints raised with the Human Rights Foundation in 2019 and 2022 and a woman's account of a sexual advance in 2021. Turkel resigned as UHRP chair a week after NOTUS article was published. According to UHRP, an investigation it commissioned found no basis for allegations of sexually inappropriate conduct, but concluded that Turkel had acted "overly familiar" with two female colleagues at a 2019 social event.

== Books ==
Turkel's 2022 book No Escape: The True Story of China's Genocide of the Uyghurs won the 2022 Moore Prize for Human Rights Writing.

== Recognition ==
In September 2020, Turkel was named one of the Time 100 Most Influential People in the World. In 2021, Fortune Magazine included him in their "The World's 50 Greatest Leaders" lists. He received the inaugural Notre Dame Prize for Religious Liberty from the Notre Dame Law School Religious Liberty Initiative in June 2021. He was awarded the Global Soul Award by Jewish World Watch in September 2022.

== Personal life ==
Turkel speaks several languages, including Uyghur (his mother tongue), English, Turkish, and Mandarin Chinese.

He married Turkish American interior designer Nazli Turkel in 2007. They live in the Washington, DC, area with their two children.

== Selected publications ==
- No Escape: The True Story of China's Genocide of the Uyghurs. HarperCollins, 2022. ISBN 978-1335469564
- "I Grew Up Witnessing Forced Labor. U.S. Companies Must Step Up." The New York Times, January 20, 2021.
- "The First Large-Scale Cyberattack by AI." The Wall Street Journal, November 23, 2025.
- "U.S. AI Leadership Needs Smarter Controls." Foreign Policy, May 7, 2025.

== See also ==
- Elnigar Iltebir
- Rebiya Kadeer
- World Uyghur Congress
