= Campaign for Uyghurs =

Cultural and political organization

- Campaign for Uyghurs logo
- Abbreviation: CFU
- Formation: 4 December 2017; 8 years ago
- Type: Non-Profit NGO
- Purpose: Promote and advocate for the human rights and democratic freedoms for the Uyghurs and other Turkic people in East Turkistan
- Headquarters: Washington, D.C., USA
- Region served: International
- Official languages: Uyghur (de facto); English, Arabic, Turkish, Mandarin Chinese, Spanish
- President: Rushan Abbas
- Key people: Mr.Uerkesh Davlet (Honorary Chairman); Mr.Dilmurat Sulayman (Deputy Director); Ms. Tunisa Matsedik-Qira (Deputy Director)
- Affiliations: World Uyghur Congress
- Website: www.campaignforuyghurs.org

Campaign for Uyghurs (Uyghur: ئۇيغۇر ھەرىكىتى; Simplified Chinese: 维吾尔运动, Traditional Chinese: 維吾爾運動; Turkish: Uygur Hareketi; abbreviated CFU) is a Washington, D.C.-based nonprofit organization. The organization operates to advocate for the democratic rights and freedoms of the Uyghur people, both in the Xinjiang Uyghur Autonomous Region (called East Turkestan by some) and around the world.

Campaign for Uyghurs describes its advocacy efforts in the framework of "[mobilizing] individuals and the international community and build bridges to take action on behalf of and to raise public awareness of the Uyghur issue with a special focus on Uyghur women and youth and to activate persons and entities to work together to stop the systematic human rights abuses against the people of East Turkestan.

The organization has testified in the US Congress, provided policy recommendations, and hosted speaking events, such as panels of witnesses and experts, to highlight and raise awareness of what the organization describes as genocidal policies that the Uyghurs are facing.

Campaign for Uyghurs received the 2025 Democracy Award by the National Endowment for Democracy for "its tireless advocacy on behalf of Uyghurs and other Muslim communities persecuted for their faith and identity under Chinese Communist Party rule".

== History ==
Campaign for Uyghurs was founded by Rushan Abbas in September 2017, and is staffed largely by directors within the organization. The Campaign coordinates training activities for activists who wish to become more vocal about what the campaign describes as an ongoing Uyghur Genocide. The organization works with vulnerable populations, generally women and youth, to foster grassroots organizing capabilities worldwide.

Rushan Abbas, in her role as executive director, has served to inform international governments on the developing genocide in Xinjiang, including at the Uyghur Tribunal in London in 2020. Abbas has testified before the US Congress on numerous occasions in her capacity as well, bringing attention to historically underserved aspects of the Uyghur community.

=== Nomination for Nobel Peace Prize ===
In February 2022, 2 U.S. lawmakers, Tom Suozzi of New York and Chris Smith of New Jersey, wrote a letter to the Norwegian Nobel Committee, saying that the Uyghur Human Rights Project (UHRP) and Campaign for Uyghurs made significant contributions to building fraternity between nations and promoting peace by defending the human rights of the Uyghur, Kazakh and other predominately Muslim ethnic minorities that the Chinese Communist Party (CCP) has targeted with genocide and other crimes against humanity. Both lawmakers stressed the gravity of the abuses, which include documented instances of mass detention, sexual violence, torture, forced labor, forced abortions, and sterilization of Uyghur Muslims. Rushan Abbas welcomed the nomination and said: “Regardless of the outcome of the nomination, the fact that the Uyghur issue will be discussed along with the Nobel Peace Prize nomination is a great victory for the Uyghur movement.”

In February 2025, Representatives John Moolenaar of Michigan, Chairman of the House Select Committee on the Chinese Communist Party, and Raja Krishnamoorthi of Illinois, Ranking Member of the same committee, nominated Campaign for Uyghurs for the Nobel Peace Prize. The nomination recognized CFU's continued efforts to advocate for justice and human rights for the Uyghur people and their work in documenting abuses, amplifying survivor testimony, empowering the Uyghur diaspora, and building international and interfaith coalitions to defend human dignity in the face of ongoing genocide and crimes against humanity perpetrated by the Chinese Communist Party. Rushan Abbas responded to the nomination, stating: "We hope this recognition brings overdue attention to the Uyghur plight. The Chinese government's crimes are not just a regional issue; they constitute a global human rights crisis that demands immediate action. The world must unite—governments, institutions, and civil society alike—to defend fundamental human rights for all, no matter the perpetrator."

=== 2025 Democracy Award ===
In November 2025, Campaign for Uyghurs received the 2025 Democracy Award from the National Endowment for Democracy (NED). According to the NED, Campaign for Uyghurs is awarded "for its tireless advocacy on behalf of Uyghurs and other Muslim communities persecuted for their faith and identity under Chinese Communist Party rule."

== Activities ==
Campaign for Uyghurs focuses activism through coordinated campaigns that address specific aspects of the persecution of Uyghurs in China. Campaign For Uyghurs is advocating for democratic rights and freedoms of the Uyghur people while highlighting the genocide being perpetrated by the CCP which is determined by a few countries internationally. The organization was recognized for its work by the World Movement for Democracy. Campaign For Uyghurs led the launch of the Berlin-Beijing Olympics Campaign with other organizations to call for a boycott of the 2022 Winter Olympics in Beijing.

=== One Voice, One Step ===
The One Voice one Step Movement was initiated by Campaign for Uyghurs on March 15, 2018. It was a global movement where hundreds of Uyghurs and supporters of the Uyghur cause demonstrated on 15 March 2018 in opposition to China's brutality and persecution of Uyghurs and their extrajudicial detention inside concentration camps. Demonstrations were global and took place in 18 cities and 14 countries, including Australia, Belgium, Canada, Finland, France, Germany, Japan, Netherlands, Norway, Sweden, Turkey, United Kingdom and the United States.

=== Forced Labor Fashion Week ===
in collaboration with the Model Alliance, Freedom United, World Uyghur Congress, Uyghur Solidarity Campaign, Free Uyghur Now student coalition, Campaign for Uyghurs organized a protest during the New York Fashion Week. The event was attended by many who stood in solidarity against China's use of Uyghur slave labor in the fashion industry.

== Reports ==
Campaign for Uyghurs issues English language reports to help inform the international community about the threats facing Uyghurs and other Turkic peoples. In July 2020, their report entitled "The Genocide of Uyghurs by Definition of the United Nations Convention on Genocide Prevention" was released. The report documents the various ways the persecution of Uyghurs in China meets the definition of Genocide established by the United Nations.
