= Rushan Abbas =

Uyghur American activist (born 1967)

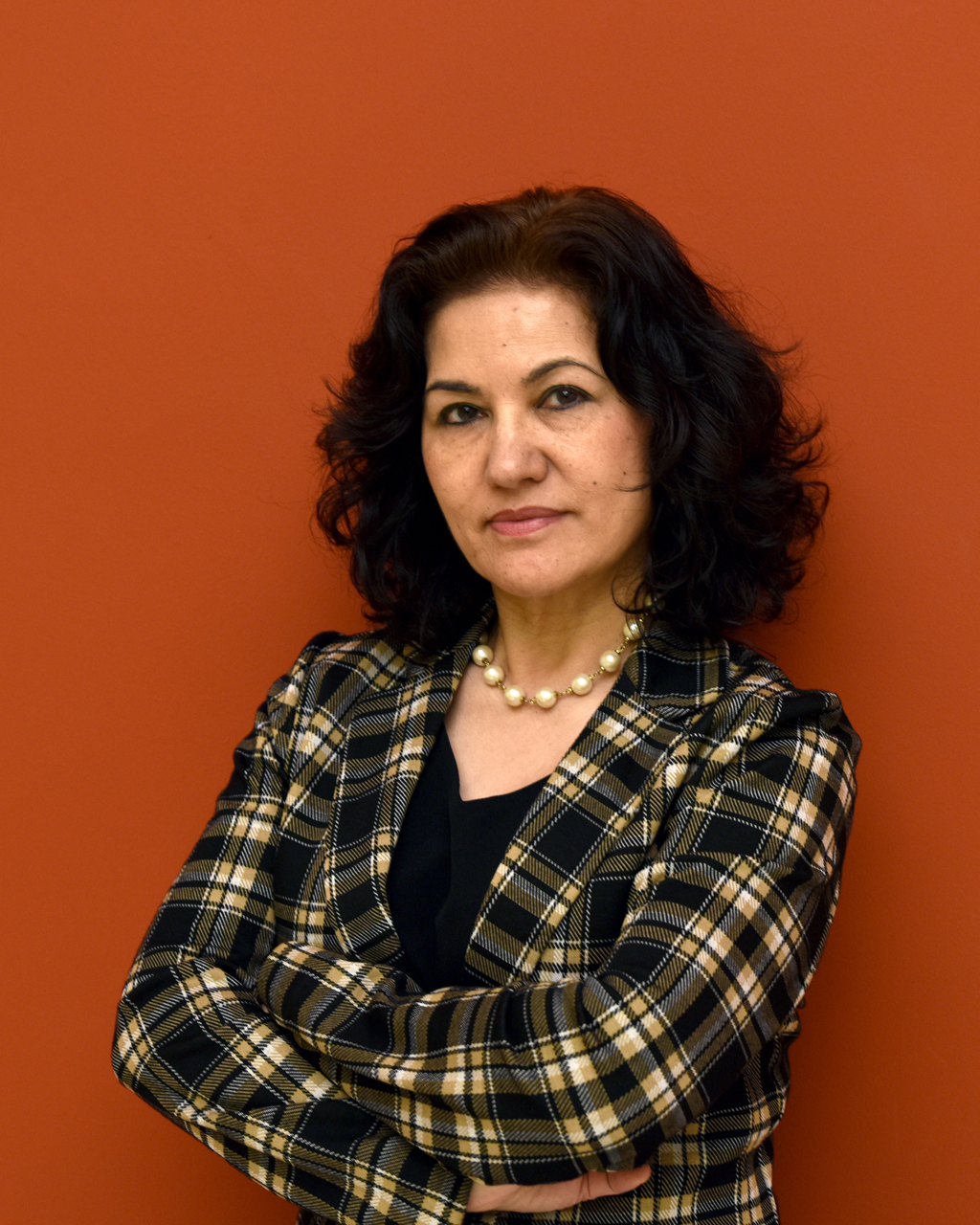
- Rushan Abbas in 2022
- Born: June 14, 1967 (age 59); Ürümqi, Xinjiang, China
- Citizenship: American
- Education: Xinjiang University; Washington State University
- Occupation: Political activist
- Known for: Founder and executive director of Campaign for Uyghurs Chairperson of the Executive Committee at World Uyghur Congress
- Notable work: Unbroken: One Uyghur's Fight for Freedom

Rushan Abbas (Uyghur: روشەن ئابباس; Chinese: 茹仙·阿巴斯; born June 14, 1967) is an Uyghur American activist and advocate from the Xinjiang Uyghur Autonomous Region in China. She is the founder and executive director of the nonprofit Campaign for Uyghurs and was elected the Chairperson of the Executive Committee of World Uyghur Congress on October 26, 2024.

Her book, Unbroken: One Uyghur’s Fight for Freedom, was published by Optimum Publishing International in 2025. In Unbroken, Abbas traces her personal journey from her university years in Urumchi to the frontlines of advocacy around the world. The book also includes excerpts from the memoir of her father, Abbas Borhan, an Uyghur intellectual who lived through Mao’s Cultural Revolution.

Abbas became one of the most prominent Uyghur voices in international activism following her sister's detainment by the Chinese government in 2018. Rushan Abbas also serves as the Chairperson of the Executive Committee at World Uyghur Congress, as the Chair of the Advisory Board of Germany's Axel Springer Freedom Foundation and as a board member of the Task Force on Human Trafficking within the Parliamentary Intelligence-Security Forum.

Abbas has received several awards, including the Freedom Fighter Award (2019) and the Huntington Her Hero Lifetime Achievement Award (2024). Her organization, Campaign for Uyghurs, received the 2025 Democracy Award from the National Endowment for Democracy.

She testified in 2019 before the Senate Foreign Relations Committee in regard to the emergence of the Xinjiang re-education camps, and the threat of Chinese power in the Eastern Pacific. She has also testified before the House of Representatives on international religious persecution, forced labor, and human rights abuses as they relate to Uyghurs.

== Early life ==
Born in Ürümqi in 1967, Abbas attended the Experiential High School (Ürümqi 17th High school) and graduated in 1984. She then continued her studies and attended Xinjiang University from 1984 until 1988 and majored in Biology. During her time at university, Abbas was one of the co-organizers of the pro-democracy rallies and demonstrations in 1985 and 1988, which protested China's policies in Xinjiang Uyghur Autonomous Region.

In 1989, she came to the United States and attended Washington State University where she pursued studies in plant pathology. During Abbas' time in the United States, she became a U.S. citizen and remained within the Uyghur American community, continuing her advocacy work which she has been actively doing since 1985. Since her move to the U.S., she has been a vocal activist and advocates for the human rights of Uyghurs. According to Abbas, China punished her father, Abbas Borhan, an Uyghur scholar, academic writer and public figure, for this, retiring him at 59 and removing him as chairman of the Science and Technology Council of the Xinjiang Uyghur Autonomous Region.

Shortly after the September 11 attacks, Abbas worked as a contractor for the U.S. military interpreting interrogations of Uyghur detainees at Guantanamo Bay through 2002. Since 2005, she has worked to help settle Uyghurs who were detained in Guantanamo Bay.

== Uyghur activism and advocacy ==
Since the late 1980s, Abbas has been a campaigner for the human rights of Uyghur people around the world. In 1988, she began her activism by participating in the Uyghur Student Protests. One of the multiple student movements in that decade, the protests generally resisted discriminatory education policies, birth control policies, the effects of nuclear testing in the Lop Nur region, a lack of genuine autonomy and representation in government and employment opportunities.

By 1998, Radio Free Asia had launched an Uyghur Service where Abbas became the first Uyghur reporter broadcasting on Xinjiang. Her activism continued in the United States, where she participated in protests against the Olympic relay in 2008 in San Francisco.

She frequently briefs and advises on policy and legislative response, including support for the Uyghur Forced Labor Prevention Act, the Uyghur Human Rights Policy Act, and greater transparency for the Sister Cities program with links to China. She works frequently with international Human Rights Organizations, civic societies and meets with international government leaders and politicians.

=== Guantanamo Bay ===
A few months after the September 11 attacks, the U.S. had transferred a group of 22 Uyghur terrorists to the Guantanamo Bay detention center as part of the ongoing War on Terror. Five were captured following a battle in Northern Afghanistan, and 17 were seized by police in Pakistan. According to Abbas, all 22 men had previously escaped the 1997 Ghulja Incident and fled to Pakistan and Afghanistan, then the only places in the area which offered protection and did not require a visa; after September 11, when the U.S. military raided Afghanistan, while trying to escape the war zone they were caught by some Pakistani bounty hunters who sold them for $5,000 each to the U.S. authorities as foreign fighters. Abbas states she was asked to serve as a translator to these Uyghurs in early 2002 and accepted a nine-month assignment, returning in 2003 for an additional two months.

In 2006, she returned to aid defense attorneys in their ongoing efforts to secure a declaration of innocence for the Uyghurs being held there. Following their release, Abbas assisted the US Department of Justice and State Department with the resettlement efforts in Albania, Sweden, Bermuda, Palau, Switzerland, El Salvador, and Slovenia.

=== One Voice One Step Women's Movement ===
Abbas introduced and led the "One Voice One Step" Uyghur Women's movement; an organized demonstration that took place on March 15, 2018, in 14 countries and 18 cities on the same day to protest China's detention of millions of Uyghurs in concentration camps. The protests were held in the United States, Germany, Belgium, Norway, Turkey, Sweden, Switzerland, the United Kingdom, the Netherlands, Australia, Canada, France, Finland, and Japan.

The demonstrations largely were held to demand that the international community take action against reports of concentration camps in the Xinjiang Uyghur Autonomous Region.

=== Hudson Institute Panel and Sister's Arrest ===
On September 5, 2018, Rushan Abbas participated on a panel discussion titled "China's 'War on Terrorism' and the Xinjiang Emergency" hosted by the Hudson Institute. Abbas spoke about the ongoing persecution of Uyghurs in China, and described the camps being used to detain Uyghurs in China. Six days later, one of Abbas's sisters and an aunt disappeared from their homes in northwest China, and Abbas believes both were both detained by the Chinese government as retaliation for her speech.

Abbas has been advocating for Uyghur people's rights, regularly appearing in the media, delivering public remarks in universities and forums, and creating international coalitions to draw attention to the Uyghur cause. Since her disappearance, the Chinese Government has confirmed that her sister, Dr. Gulshan Abbas, is being held in a prison inside China on alleged terror charges.

Beyond this confirmation, few details have been made publicly available.

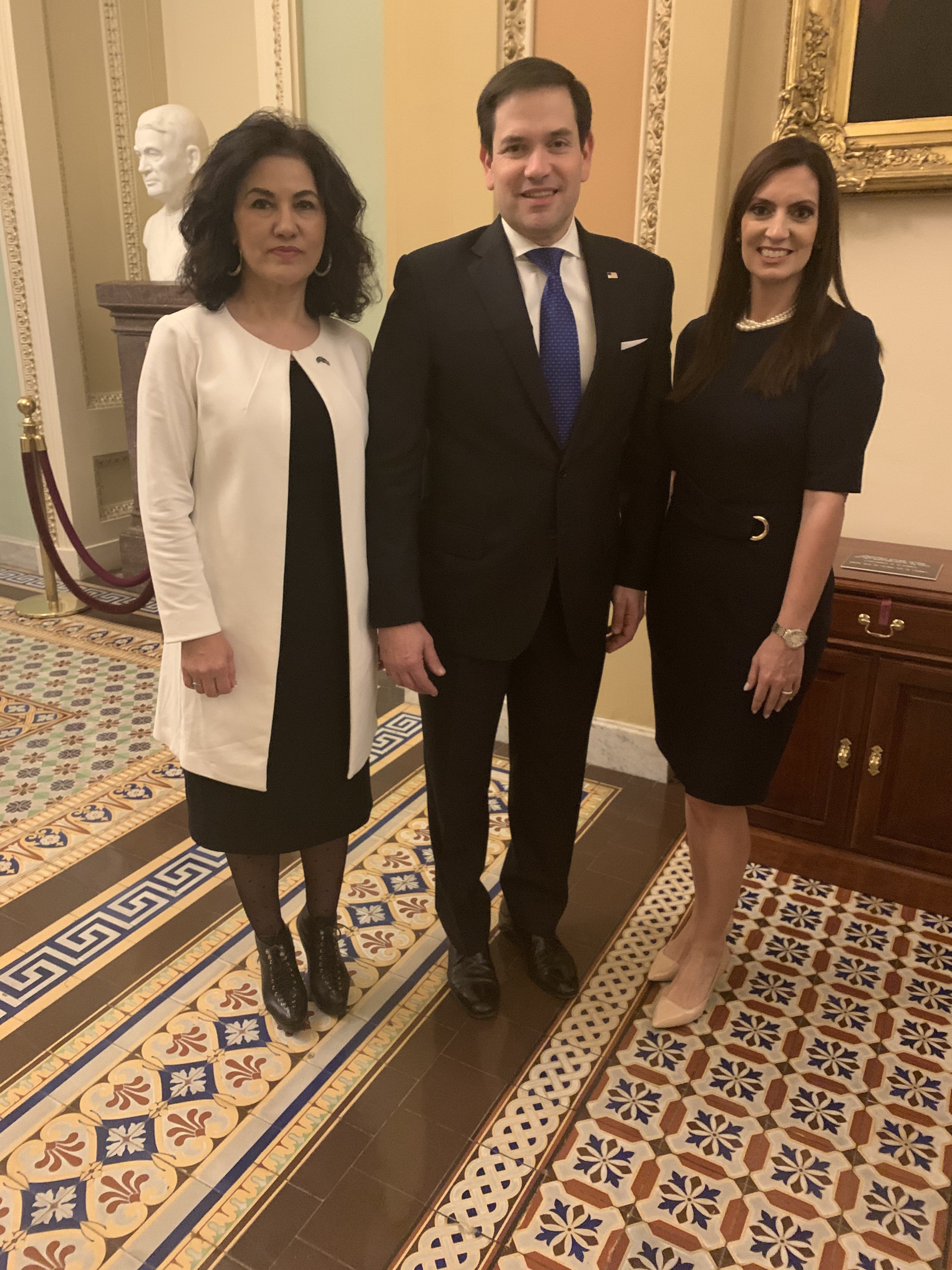
Abbas, Marco Rubio and Jeanette Nuñez before attending 2020 State of the Union.

=== Campaign for Uyghurs ===
In 2017, Abbas founded Campaign for Uyghurs. The non-profit is based in Washington, DC, and is used to organize internationally for the rights of Uyghur people. The primary focus of the organization are the ongoing crimes against humanity in China, which have been designated a genocide by some nations. Campaign for Uyghurs regularly engages in activism at the federal level in the United States, advocating the passage of legislation that restricts forced labor and advances human rights.

Through her work at CFU, Abbas has been recognized by Government officials at the National Prayer Breakfast, and the State of the Union, where she was the guest of Senator Marco Rubio in February 2020. In 2023, Rushan attended as the guest of Ranking Member Raja Krishnamoorthi. In 2024, Rushan was invited and attended as a guest of Representative Chris Smith, Chairman of the Congressional Executive Commission on China.

Her work has drawn the ire of the Chinese Government on occasion, especially in the state-owned media apparatus, where she has been accused of being a member of a separatist group in East Turkistan.

==== Nomination of Campaign for Uyghurs for Nobel Peace Prize ====
In February 2022, two U.S. legislators, Tom Suozzi of New York and Chris Smith of New Jersey, nominated the Campaign for Uyghurs, along with the Uyghur Human Rights Project, for the Nobel Peace Prize, for their "significant contributions to building fraternity among peoples and promoting peace by defending the human rights of the Uyghur, Kazakh and other predominately Muslim ethnic minorities that the Chinese Communist Party (CCP) has targeted with genocide and other crimes against humanity." Rushan Abbas welcomed the nomination, saying, "Regardless of the outcome of the nomination, the fact that the Uighur issue will be discussed along with the nomination for the Nobel Peace Prize is a great victory for the Uighur movement."

In February 2025, Representatives John Moolenaar of Michigan, Chairman of the House Select Committee on the Chinese Communist Party, and Raja Krishnamoorthi of Illinois, Ranking Member of the same committee, nominated Campaign for Uyghurs for the Nobel Peace Prize.

==== 2025 Democracy Award ====
In November 2025, Abbas, on behalf of Campaign for Uyghurs, received the 2025 Democracy Award from the National Endowment for Democracy (NED). According to the NED, Campaign for Uyghurs is awarded "for its tireless advocacy on behalf of Uyghurs and other Muslim communities persecuted for their faith and identity under Chinese Communist Party rule."

=== United States politics ===
Abbas has appeared before congress on multiple occasions to testify on issues of Human Rights, specifically as they relate to the status of Uyghurs living in China. She testified in 2019 before the Senate Foreign Relations Committee in regard to the emergence of concentration camps in the Xinjiang Uyghur Autonomous Region, and the threat of Chinese power in the Eastern Pacific.

In 2020, she testified before the House of Representatives on international religious persecution, and the role of islamophobia in the ongoing human rights abuses in China. In 2021, she testified on the issue of forced labor as it relates to Uyghurs, and the economic coercive power being used in China.

She has been vocal in the Biden administration, writing in 2021 that she hopes "the Biden administration ensures the Uyghur Human Rights Policy Act, which passed with nearly unanimous bipartisan support and imposes sanctions on entities and individuals involved in these human rights abuses, will be enforced to the full extent. The Biden administration must also prioritize Section 307 of the Tariff Act — which outlaws forced labor imports — and ensure that thorough and effective enforcement is applied to every ban on products originating from the Uighur homeland."

== Other work ==
Previously, Abbas was Director of Business Development at ISI Consultants, which offers to assist "US companies to grow their businesses in Middle East and African markets." Her credentials, according to the company website, include "over 15 years of experience in global business development, strategic business analysis, business consultancy, and government affairs throughout the Middle East, Africa, CIS regions, Europe, Asia, Australia, North America, and Latin America", refers to her work as an International Business Director and International Marketing Liaison.

== See also ==
- Uyghur Americans
- Guantanamo Bay detention camp
- Xinjiang re-education camps
- Patricio Henríquez
- Rebiya Kadeer
