= No Escape =

No Escape may refer to:

== Film ==
- No Escape (1934 film), a British drama
- No Escape (1943 film) or I Escaped from the Gestapo, an American drama
- No Escape (1936 film), a British thriller
- No Escape (1953 film), an American film noir
- No Escape (1994 film), an American science-fiction film
- No Escape (2015 film), an American action thriller film
- No Escape (2020 film), an American horror film

== Gaming ==
- No Escape (video game), a 1994 platform game for Sega Genesis and SNES
- No Escape (2000 video game), a Windows shooter from Funcom
- No Escape!, a 1983 Atari 2600 video game from Imagic

== Music ==
- No Escape (album), a 1979 album by the Marc Tanner Band
- "No Escape", a 2010 song by The Showdown from Blood in the Gears
- "No Escape", a 2011 song by The Browning from Burn This World
- "No Escape", a 2012 song by Coldrain from Through Clarity
- "No Escape", a 2013 song by Masterplan from Novum Initium
- "No Escape", a 2018 song by Will Haven from Muerte
- "No Escape", a 2020 song by Blue Stahli from Copper
- "No Escape", a 2024 song by Asteria, D3r, and M1v

== Television ==
- "No Escape" (The Incredible Hulk), a 1979 television episode
- No Escape (TV series), a British television series
- WWE No Escape, the German name for the WWE Elimination Chamber pay-per-view

== Other ==
- No Escape: Male Rape in U.S. Prisons, a 2001 report by Human Rights Watch
- No Escape: The True Story of China's Genocide of the Uyghurs, a 2022 book by Nury Turkel
- "No Escapin'", a storyline in the science fiction comedy webtoon series Live with Yourself!

== See also ==
- Quicksand: No Escape, a 1992 American thriller television film
- Tidal Wave: No Escape, a 1997 American television film
