= Alptekin =

Alptekin is a Turkish surname. Notable people with the surname include:

- Erkin Alptekin, Uyghur activist
- Huseyin Bahri Alptekin, Turkish artist
- Isa Alptekin, Uyghur political leader
- Kamil Ekim Alptekin, Turkish businessman
