= Uyghur American Association =

Human rights and cultural organization

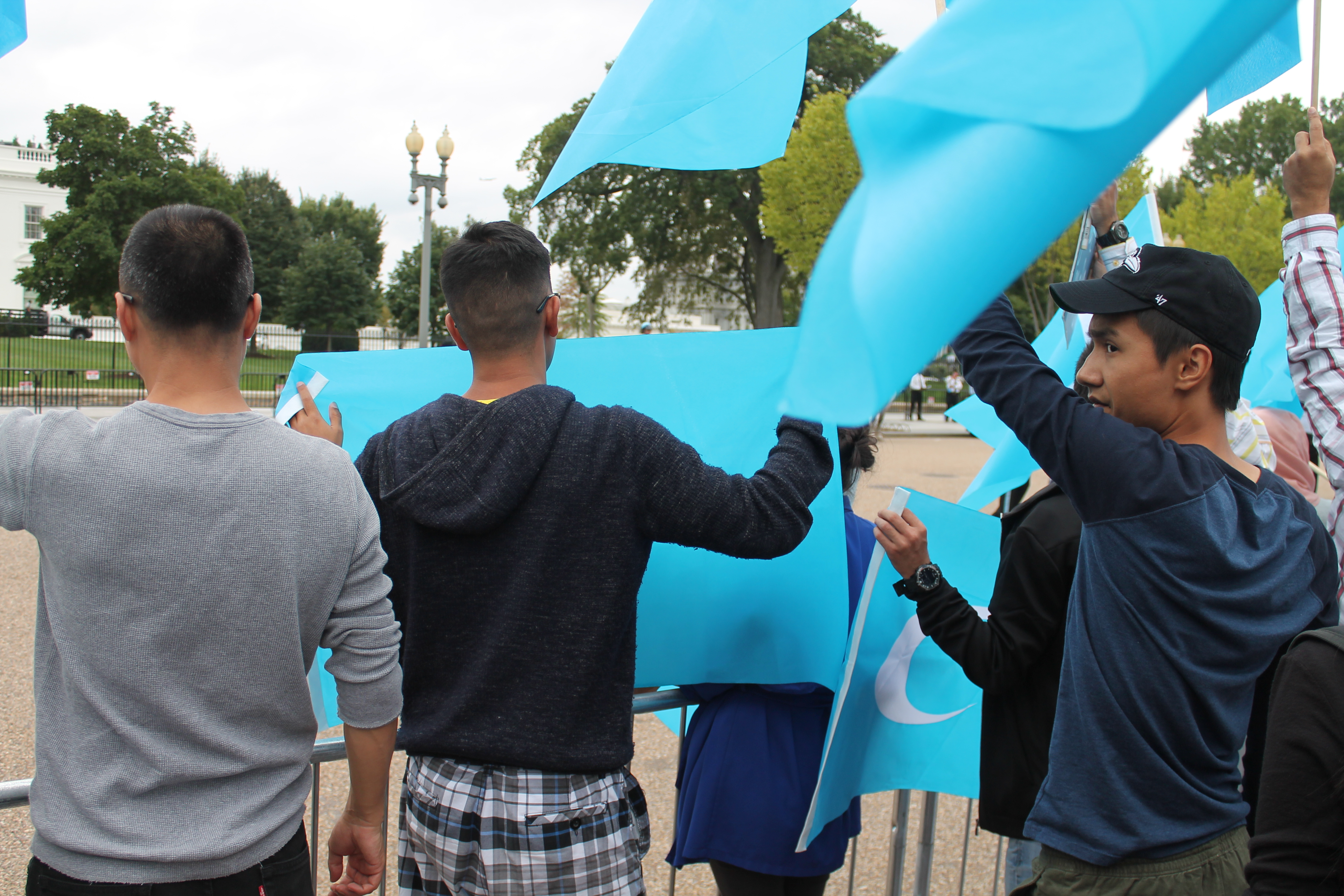
- A 2015 demonstration against Xi Jinping's visit to the White House
- Abbreviation: UAA
- Formation: November 16, 1998; 27 years ago
- Type: 501(c)(3) organization
- Tax ID no.: 84-3741842
- Purpose: Promote Uyghur culture and human rights issues
- Headquarters: Washington, D.C., United States
- Location: United States
- Coordinates: 38°51′33.14″N 77°19′58.87″W
- Members: approx. 1,000
- Official languages: Uyghur; English
- President: Elfidar Iltebir
- Affiliations: Uyghur Human Rights Project and World Uyghur Congress
- Website: uyghuraa.org

The Uyghur American Association (Uyghur: ئامېرىكا ئۇيغۇر جەمئىيىتى, ئامېرىكا ئۇيغۇر بىرلىكى, romanized: Amérika Uyghur Birliki, Америка Уйғур Бирлики; Chinese: 维吾尔裔美国人协会; pinyin: Wéiwú'ěryì Měiguórén Xiéhuì; abbreviated UAA) is a prominent Uyghur American non-profit advocacy organization based in Washington, D. C. in the United States. It was established in 1998 by a group of Uyghur overseas activists to raise the public awareness of the Uyghur people, who primarily reside in Xinjiang, China, also known as East Turkestan. The Uyghur American Association is an affiliate organization of the World Uyghur Congress and works to promote the Uyghur culture and improved human rights conditions for Uyghurs.

== History ==
The UAA was founded in 1998. The UAA has had tax-exempt status since April 1998. Uyghur activist Rushan Abbas played a significant role in the establishment of the UAA. She went on to become UAA Vice President and was the first Uyghur reporter to broadcast daily to the Uyghur region, for Radio Free Asia, in 1998.

In April 2004, the National Endowment for Democracy provided US$75,000 for the UAA. This was the first time the American government had provided aid to a Uyghur exile group.

In 2004, with a supporting grant from the National Endowment for Democracy, the UAA founded the Uyghur Human Rights Project (UHRP) for the purpose of promoting improved human rights conditions for Uyghurs and other minority groups in China's Xinjiang Uyghur Autonomous Region on the premise that the assurance of basic human rights will facilitate the realization of the community's democratic aspirations.

In 2006, the UAA established a UHRP satellite office in Bishkek, Kyrgyzstan.

An article published by the Associated Press on October 10, 2008, quoted Elshat Hassan and Nury Turkel, two leaders of the Uyghur American Association, about plans for American-Uyghurs to help the Uyghur detainees at Guantanamo Bay acclimatize, once they have been admitted to the US. Court records included a detailed plan by the UAA to assist Uyghur detainees in resettling in the United States.

In July 2009, Chinese officials singled out Rebiya Kadeer, then UAA President, for inciting the July 2009 Ürümqi riots. The Chinese government said that a photograph provided by the UAA which was supposed to be East Turkestan separatist protesters in Ankara, Turkey was actually the scene of a traffic accident in Hangzhou, China.

In December 2009, the UAA expressed concern at the return of 20 Uyghur refugees from Cambodia to China.

In February 2012, the UAA and UHRP announced the launch of their redesigned websites, including a Mandarin Chinese version.

Alim Seytoff, UAA President, said that China was increasingly able to leverage its economic and strategic weight in countries such as Thailand to seek the forcible return of individuals in disregard of international human rights conventions and norms.

In a 2015 Reuters report, Australia's Refugee Review Tribunal was reported to have reviewed an unnamed Uyghur man's asylum application from September 2011. The review cited sworn testimony from UAA President Alim Seytoff that, "there is an extensive network of spies including some Uyghurs, who regularly monitor the activities of Uyghurs throughout the Western world and report on their activities to the PRC (People's Republic of China) authorities."

On August 16, 2016, the Board of Directors of the UAA voted to separate the UAA from the Uyghur Human Rights Project (UHRP).

In a 2016 interview with CNN, UAA President Ilshat Hassan said that his family had faced repeated harassment over his activism.

On October 18, 2019, an exhibition named "A Prison Without Walls — East Turkestan Today", was opened, featuring photographs of re-education camps, the everyday lives of Uighurs and the July 2009 Urumqi riots opened at Taipei's 228 Memorial Museum. The exhibition was originally organized by the UAA and the One Voice, One Step initiative and has been presented in 33 cities in 15 countries. The exhibition was to run for one month.

In a 2019 CNN interview, Nury Turkel, former head of the Uyghur American Association and chairman of the Uyghur Human Rights Project, discussing cybersecurity issues encountered by these organizations, reported that the UAA and UHRP, "were constantly attacked. Our websites were shut down at times, and I was personally the target of email-based hacking attempts."

On 14 February 2022, the UAA and the Religious Action Center of Reform Judaism along with basketball star Enes Kanter Freedom jointly hosted a video event to raise awareness for the plight of Uyghurs in China.

In December 2022, UAA President Kuzzat Altay visited Israel and implored its government to not turn a blind eye to China's genocide, adding he believed that "no one can understand us better than the Jewish people".

== Organization ==
As of late 2008, the Uyghur American Association had approximately 600 members. More than 200 members attended the Eighth Congress of the UAA in 2016. The organization has a president and a board of directors which, as of the founding in 1998, consisted of nine members: Chairman, Vice Chairman, General Secretary, Treasurer, Director of Public Relations, Director of Education, Director of Communication, Director of Publication, and Director of Cultural Affairs. The UAA has received funding from the National Endowment for Democracy. As of 2005, the UAA's website was one of the two most active websites among Uyghur migrants. The UAA website has been described as a key information provider on Uyghur issues. The UAA renounces the use of violence to achieve political ends.

=== Presidents ===
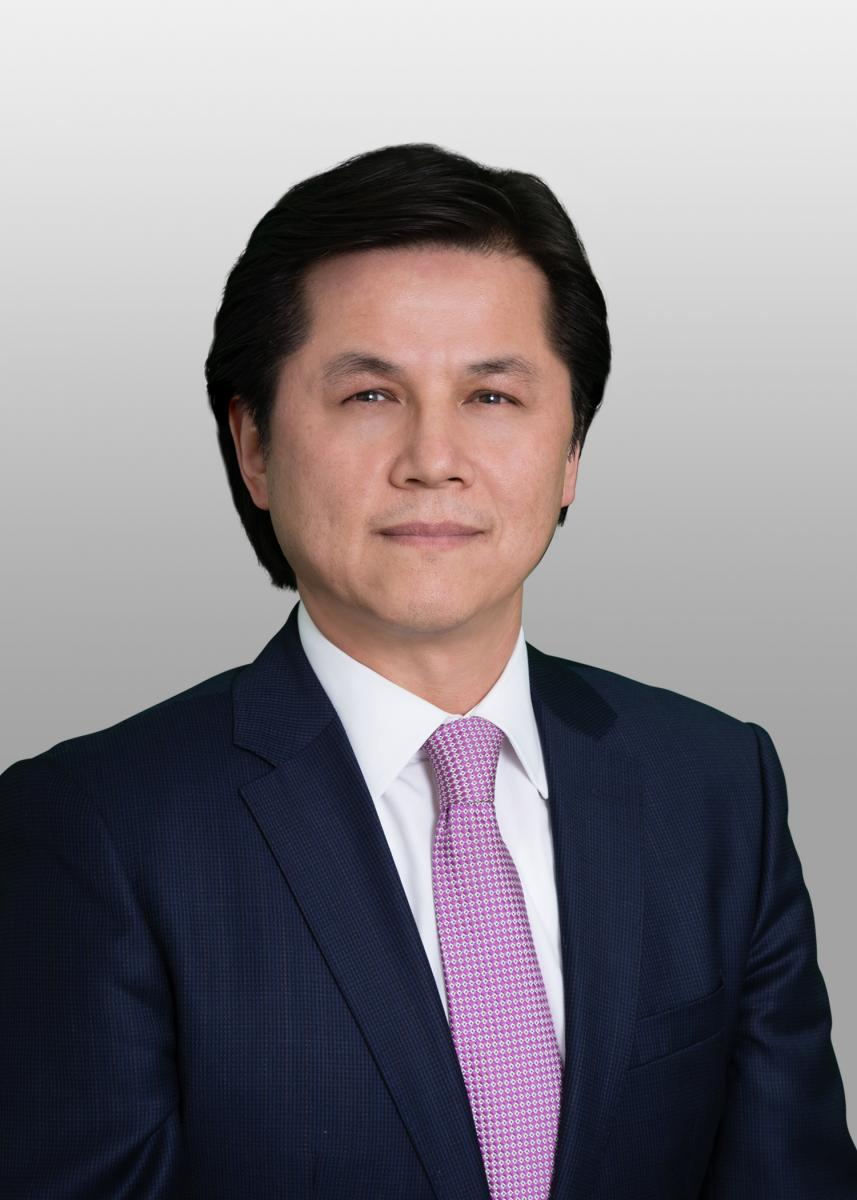
Nury Turkel, former UAA President and co-founder of the Uyghur Human Rights Project

- Turdi Ghoja (from 2000)
- Nury A. Turkel (2004–2006), Vice President Omer Kanat
- Rebiya Kadeer (2006–2011)
- Alim Seytoff
- Ilshat Hassan Kokbore (from 2016)
- Kuzzat Altay

=== Congresses ===
The First Congress was held in Arlington on May 23, 1998.

The Second Congress was held in Washington, DC on May 28, 2000.

The Fourth Congress was held in Washington, DC on May 29, 2004.

The Fifth Congress was held on May 29, 2006.

The Seventh General Congress of the UAA was held in Annandale, Virginia, on November 10, 2012.

The Eighth General Congress was held in June 2016.

== See also ==
- Uyghur Americans
- East Turkestan independence movement
- World Uyghur Congress
