= East Turkistan National Awakening Movement =

Cultural and political organization

East Turkistan National Movement (also known as East Turkistan National Awakening Movement)
- Abbreviation: ETNM / ETNAM
- Formation: June 2017; 9 years ago
- Type: Non-Profit NGO
- Purpose: Advocating for the human rights of East Turkistan's people and the independence of East Turkistan.
- Location: Washington, DC
- Region served: International
- Official languages: English, Uyghur
- Founder and President: Salih Hudayar
- General Secretary: Arif Jan
- Main organ: Executive Committee
- Website: nationalawakening.org

The East Turkistan National Movement (abbr. ETNM; Uyghur: شەرقىي تۈركىستان مىللىي ھەرىكىتى) also known as the East Turkistan National Awakening Movement (abbr. ETNAM; Uyghur: شەرقىي تۈركىستان مىللىي ئويغۇنۇش ھەرىكىتى) is a non-profit human rights and political advocacy organization established in June 2017 in Washington D.C. Salih Hudayar, a Uyghur American consultant and graduate student founded the group after pre-existing Uyghur organizations failed to openly call for East Turkestan independence deeming it "controversial".

== Advocacy ==
According to ETNM, it seeks to establish "unity, democratic values and compassion" amongst the people of East Turkistan.

ETNM strongly believes that the East Turkistan National Movement is not exclusive to the Uyghurs but all Turkic peoples of East Turkistan including Kazakhs, Kyrgyz, Uzbeks, Tatars, and others. The group advocates for "the end of China's colonization and occupation of East Turkistan and actively strives to restore the independence of East Turkestan."

ETNM shares an office with the East Turkistan Government-in-Exile (ETGE). Although the ETGE has existed since 2004, ETNM is the most prominent Uyghur NGO to not portray the Uyghur and other Turkic peoples of East Turkistan as a simply a "persecuted minority," but rather as an occupied nation.

== Activities ==
Since its founding, ETNM has organized numerous demonstrations calling for the independence of East Turkistan and lobbied members of the US Congress to enact bills to help "protect" the Uyghur and other Turkic peoples of Xinjiang. On 20 December 2018, in remembrance of the 69th anniversary of China's occupation of East Turkistan, the group organized a march from the White House to the State Department and called on the US government to "recognize the genocide occurring in East Turkistan" and also called on the United Nations to "act according to the UN Genocide Convention and stop the 21st century Holocaust".

Hudayar gave a speech calling on support for achieving East Turkestan's independence at a Committee on the Present Danger: China event on 9 April 2019.

In 2019, researchers with the ETNM claimed to have identified at least 124 internment camps, 193 prisons, and 66 bingtuan labor camps along with 37 military facilities in Xinjiang".

On 1 October 2019, the 70th Anniversary of the People's Republic of China, Hudayar joined dozens of Uyghurs, Tibetans, Hong Kongers, Mongolians, and Kazakhs in front of the United Nations in New York City, where he called on the United Nations to recognize China's atrocities against Uyghurs, Tibetans, and others as a genocide and to recognize East Turkistan, Tibet, and South Mongolia as Occupied Territories. On 11 October 2019, ETNAM participated in a joint rally for Hong Kong hosted by the College Democrats and the College Republicans of the Catholic University of America where Hudayar joined former Senior Director for Strategic Planning at the White House, Brigadier General Robert Spalding in calling for support for Hong Kong.

On 12 November 2019, the 86th Anniversary of the First East Turkestan Republic and the 75th Anniversary of the Second East Turkistan Republic, ETNM held a press conference where they released the coordinates of 182 suspected concentration camps, along with producing a map of East Turkistan containing 209 points labeled prisons, and 74 points labeled labor camps. ETNM stated it would release further coordinates of prisons and labor camps in coming weeks. After the press conference, ETNM also held a joint demonstration with the East Turkistan Government in Exile in front of the US Capitol, where they called on the US Congress to pass the Uyghur Human Rights Policy Act and to recognize East Turkistan as an Occupied Territory.

In late February 2020, ETNM called on the international community to turn their attention to the alleged plight of the Uyghurs and other Turkic peoples in East Turkistan amidst the COVID-19 pandemic. Starting in early March 2020, Hudayar, who was elected Prime Minister of the East Turkistan Government in Exile on 11 November 2019, spoke to numerous journalists and media outlets about China's forced transfer of Uyghur and other Turkic peoples to Chinese provinces for forced labor which he described as "slave labor." On 19 June 2020, ETNM held a demonstration in front of the White House to thank the United States Government for passing and signing the Uyghur Human Rights Policy Act into law. ETNM also called on for independence for East Turkistan and condemned China's oppression of Uyghur and other Turkic peoples.

== ICC Case ==
On 6 July 2020, The New York Times and The Wall Street Journal reported that the East Turkistan National Movement (ETNM) and the East Turkistan Government in Exile filed an official complaint urging the International Criminal Court (ICC) to investigate and prosecute Chinese officials for genocide and other crimes against humanity. The complaint is the first attempt to use an international legal forum to challenge China over allegations of extensive human rights abuses against Muslim Turkic people in Xinjiang. The 80-page complaint included a list of more than 30 senior Chinese officials, including Chinese Communist Party general secretary Xi Jinping, whom the organization holds responsible. The next day, ETGE and the ETNAM held an online press conference in Washington, DC and The Hague. Hudayar told Radio Free Asia's Chinese service that "for too long we have been oppressed by China and its Communist Party and we have suffered so much that the genocide of our people can be no longer ignored."

On 9 July 2020, the US Government sanctioned 3 senior Chinese officials including Xinjiang Party Secretary Chen Quanguo and Zhu Hailun who were among the 30 officials mentioned in the complaint to the ICC. Hudayar told Radio Free Asia that the ETGE welcomed the sanctions and that Uyghurs wanted real justice. He stated that the Chinese officials should be put on trial like the Nazis during the Nuremberg Trials.

== See also ==
- East Turkestan independence movement
- First East Turkestan Republic
- Second East Turkestan Republic
- Uyghur nationalism
- East Turkistan Government in Exile
