= Ozzy Inguanzo =

Cuban-American screenwriter

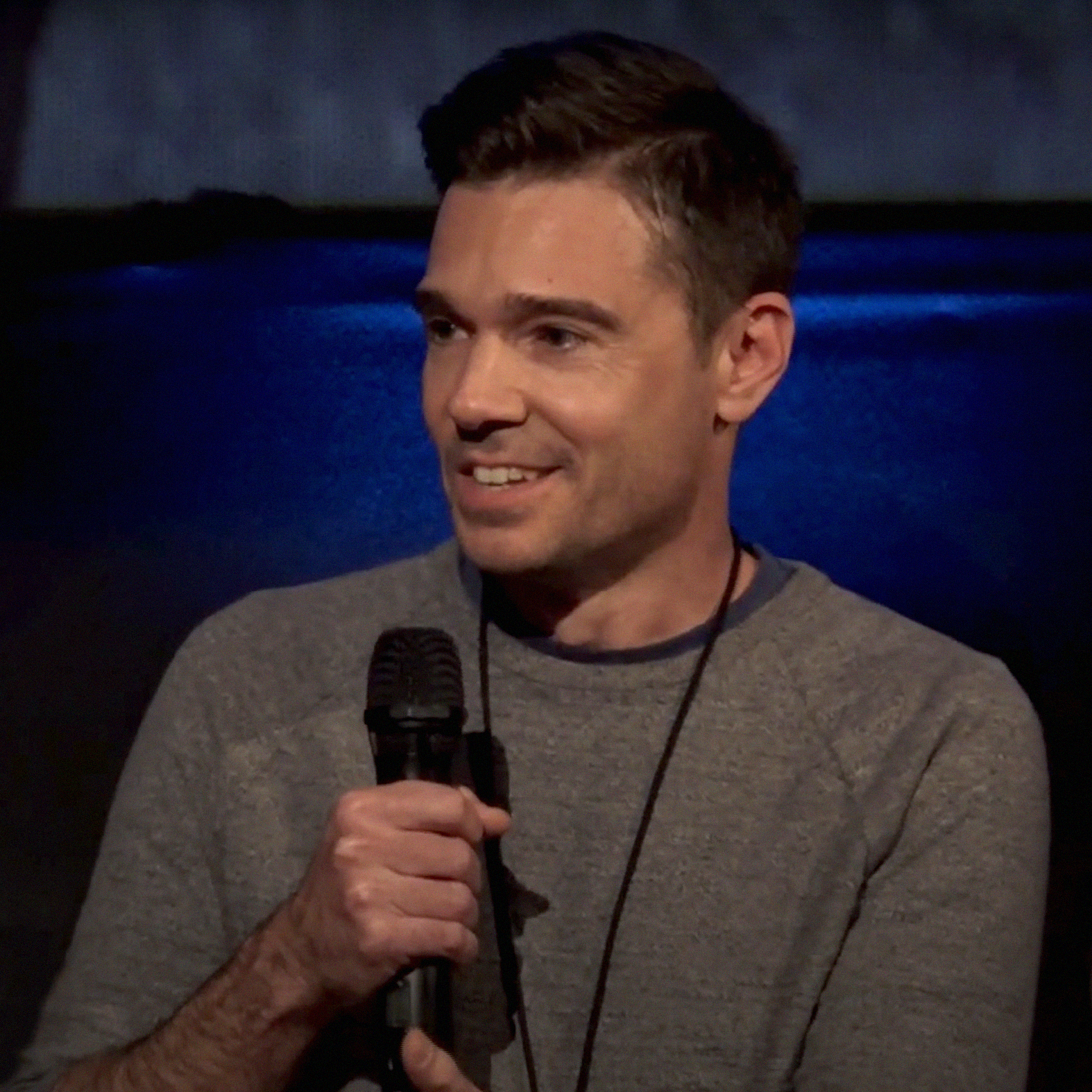
- Inguanzo in 2018
- Education: University of Miami
- Occupations: Writer, Producer, Filmmaker
- Writing career
- Language: Spanish, English

Ozzy Inguanzo is a Cuban-American screenwriter, producer, and published author. His feature screenplay Our Man in Miami made the 2023 Black List. In 2019, he received the Writers Guild of America Award for Best Documentary Screenplay.

== Career ==
=== Film ===
Inguanzo is a frequent collaborator with director James Mangold, most recently working on the Academy Award-nominated films Ford v Ferrari and Logan. As a consultant, he has worked with directors, writers, production designers, and executives, contributing his research, world building skills, and character ideas that are then utilized in the story development and scriptwriting process.

Inguanzo began his career with an apprenticeship at Walt Disney Pictures with Dean Tavoularis, the acclaimed production designer of The Godfather films. He served as a primary aide to director Sam Raimi during the Spider-Man trilogy, and worked with Academy Award-winning screenwriter Alvin Sargent during story and script development for what were initially planned as the third and fourth final installments of the film franchise.

In 2013, Inguanzo directed and produced Tomas Milian: Acting on Instinct, also executive produced by Academy Award-winner Bob Murawski, which was included in the digitally remastered Blu-ray release of Spaghetti Western cult classic The Big Gundown.

Inguanzo wrote and co-produced Bathtubs Over Broadway, which premiered at the Tribeca Film Festival and was released by Focus Features in 2018. The film, executive produced by Blumhouse Television, Impact Partners, and David Letterman, received critical acclaim on the festival circuit, culminating in Inguanzo winning the Writers Guild Award for Best Documentary Screenplay. He went on to produce the motion picture soundtrack for the film, which was released in August 2019 through Universal's Back Lot Music label.

Inguanzo produced Television Event, which was an official selection for the 2020 Tribeca Film Festival and DOC NYC, where it made its world premiere. The film received acclaim on the festival circuit, and won awards for Best Film and Best Director at Sidewalk Film Festival and RiverRun International Film Festival respectfully.

=== Published works ===
Inguanzo has authored several non-fiction books about filmmaking. His latest, LAIKA: The Magic Behind a Stop-Motion Dream Factory, was published by Rizzoli on March 10, 2026. It delves into the creative process behind the Portland-based studio’s two decades of groundbreaking animation, from Coraline to Wildwood. For its release, LAIKA and Rizzoli hosted sold-out book launch events in Los Angeles, New York, and London. The book was in its third printing within a week of its initial release.

In 2021, Titan Books published Inguanzo's Ghostbusters: Afterlife: The Art and Making of the Movie. The book provides an in-depth look at the creative development and production of the next chapter in the original Ghostbusters universe. Ghostbusters: Afterlife director Jason Reitman supplies the book's foreword.

Rizzoli published Inguanzo's Zombies on Film: The Definitive Story of Undead Cinema in 2014, a history of the Zombie film genre throughout its first nine decades. Japanese and French translations of the book were subsequently published by PIE International (ゾンビ映画年代記) and Hoëbeke (Les Zombies au Cinéma).

Inguanzo's first book, Constructing Green Lantern: From Page to Screen, was published by DC Comics and Rizzoli in 2011, chronicling the visual development and making of the Warner Bros. live-action feature film starring Ryan Reynolds. The book's introduction was written by comic book writer, screenwriter, and producer Geoff Johns.
