= Dolkun Isa =

Uyghur political activist (born 1967)

- دولقۇن ئەيسا
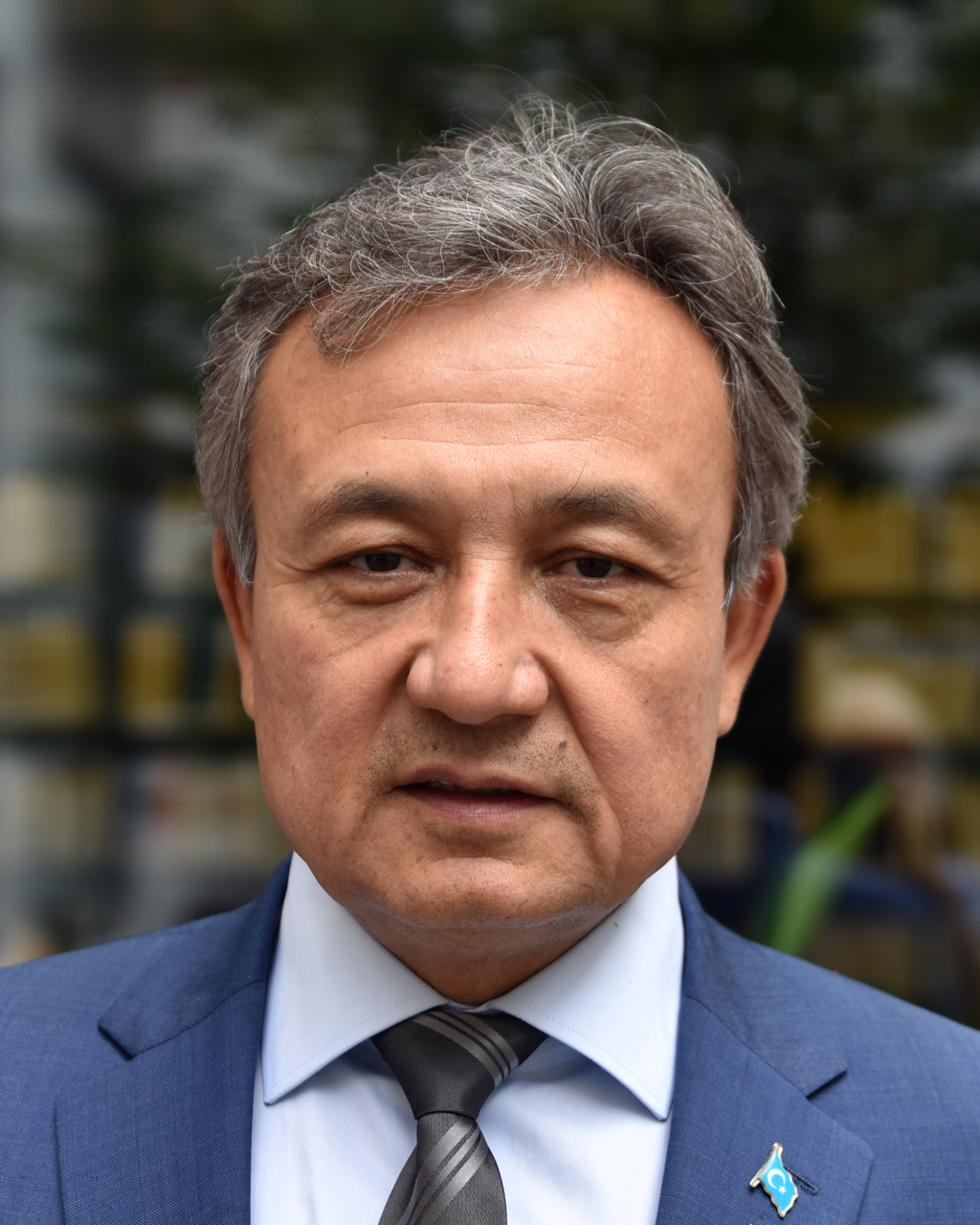
- Dolkun Isa in 2022

3rd President of the World Uyghur Congress
- In office 12 November 2017 – 4 August 2024
- Vice President: Erkin Ekrem; Perhat Muhammet; Zubeyre Shemsidin
- Preceded by: Rebiya Kadeer
- Succeeded by: Turghunjan Alawudun

Personal details
- Born: 2 September 1967 (age 59) Aksu, Xinjiang, China
- Education: Xinjiang University; Gazi University
- Occupation: Political activist
- Known for: President of the World Uyghur Congress; Vice-President of the UNPO
- Website: World Uyghur Congress website

Uyghur name
- Uyghur: دولقۇن ئەيسا
Transcriptions
- Latin Yëziqi: Dolqun Eysa
- Siril Yëziqi: Долқун Ейса

Chinese name
- Chinese: 多里坤·艾沙
Transcriptions
Standard Mandarin
- Hanyu Pinyin: Duōlǐkūn Àishā

Dolkun Isa (Uyghur: دولقۇن ئەيسا; born 2 September 1967) is a Uyghur activist based in Germany, who was the third President of the World Uyghur Congress (WUC) and now serves as the President of the Uyghur Center for Democracy and Human Rights (UZDM). He previously served as the General Secretary and Chairman of the Executive Committee of the WUC. He has presented Uyghur human rights issues to the UN Human Rights Council, European Parliament, European governments and international human rights organizations. The Chinese government has labelled him a terrorist for his advocacy since 2003.

While he was studying at Xinjiang University, he led a student demonstration on 15 June 1988 in Ürümqi against alleged discrimination and unfair treatment of Uyghurs and was expelled from the school later that year. He continued his studies in Beijing from 1990 to 1994. In November 1996, he played an important role in establishing the World Uyghur Youth Congress in Germany and served as Executive Chairman and President. In April 2004, he played an important role in the establishment of the WUC. He also served as the Vice-President of UNPO.

== Early life and departure from China ==
Dolkun Isa was born 2 September 1967 in Aksu and raised by his grandparents in Kalpin County in Aksu Prefecture until 9 years old; later he moved back to Aksu City and completed his Middle school and High school there. In 1984, he was admitted by the Faculty of Physics of Xinjiang University and studied there until his dismissal in early 1988, just a half-year before he was to graduate, due to his human rights activities for minorities. After that, he returned to Aksu and worked for education. In 1990, he moved to Beijing where he studied English and Turkish until 1994. He then left the country due to a claimed detention threat and studied in Gazi University in Ankara, Turkey and received a master's degree in Politics and Sociology. Later, he traveled to Europe and sought asylum there. In 2006, he became a citizen of Germany.

== East Turkestan Independence Movement ==
China's government claims that Dolkun is the vice-chairman of the East Turkestan Liberation Organization, however, this is denied by Dolkun. This claim by China has led to China's issuance of a red notice to Interpol, which has not been acted on by Germany or any other country in the West where he has subsequently traveled. He has been on a Chinese list of wanted terrorists since 2003. Dolkun has condemned all terrorist activities.

In February 2018, Dolkun's red notice was removed by Interpol, to strong protest of China. The removal mollified concerns that Interpol president Meng Hongwei, a Chinese national, would exert undue influence over Interpol's decision-making process. However, on his next return to China, Hongwei was secretly detained by authorities in China for a period of time and resigned.

== Activities ==
=== 2009 Taiwan travel ban ===
Dolkun was admitted to Taiwan in 2006 to attend the meeting of the Unrepresented Nations and Peoples Organization, a movement co-founded by Taiwan in 1991, during the administration of pro-localization president Chen Shui-bian. There were reports in Taiwanese media in July 2009 that Dolkun had secretly entered the country in the lead-up to the World Games which were hosted in the southern city of Kaohsiung. This prompted the National Immigration Agency of the then China-friendly KMT government to issue a ban on his travel to Taiwan. Rebiya Kadeer was denied a visa to visit Taiwan later in 2009, a move linked to Dolkun's alleged connections with terrorists. Premier Wu Den-yih stated that if Dolkun or Kadeer stepped down from their respective positions in the World Uyghur Congress as secretary-general and president, the ban would be lifted.

=== Olympics ===
Dolkun called for a boycott of the 2008 Summer Olympics, which were held in Beijing, due to an alleged cultural genocide that was being conducted against the people of East Turkestan, as China's western Xinjiang region is called by the Uyghurs, and Tibet. Dolkun told AFP that China had failed to improve human rights in Tibet and Xinjiang, where Beijing is accused by rights groups of cracking down on local ethnic groups. Uyghur activists have been seeking independence or autonomy for East Turkestan.

=== Meeting with Binali Yıldırım ===
On 16 February 2018, Turkish Prime Minister Binali Yıldırım met with Dolkun in Munich, where he came for the World Security Conference. Dolkun told the PM about the situation of 11 Uyghurs who were in custody in Malaysia and reminded the PM of the Chinese occupation, forced assimilation, transformation, and religious and ethnic genocide practices in East Turkestan. Dolkun also met with Süleyman Soylu, the Minister of the Interior of Turkey.

=== Prevention from UN forum ===
On Monday, 16 April 2018, Dolkun was prevented from entering the UN premises to participate in the first day of the Forum. When asked for an explanation, UN security was unable to elaborate further on the justification for the refusal, citing 'security concerns' once more. Dolkun remarked that "This represents a clear signal of the success of China's attempts to manipulate the UN system. I am incredibly disappointed and appalled that the UN has been undermined to this extent."

On 21 May 2018, during the resumed session of the Committee on Non-Governmental Organizations in the UN, the Chinese delegation claimed that Dolkun had been "participating, inciting and funding separatism and terrorism for years", adding that while participating in regional dialogues at UNPFII he had indicated that he was "representing WUC instead of STP", despite only having accreditation as an STP representative. "All the above actions seriously violates relevant rules and regulations of the United Nations," the letter said, urging the Committee on Non-Governmental Organizations "to uphold the authority of the UN Charter and withdraw the consultative status of STP".

Kelley Currie, the United States representative to the UN for economic and social affairs, accused Beijing of preventing Dolkun from entering UN headquarters in New York to speak at a forum on indigenous rights in February 2018. Beijing demanded that the UN-accredited organization that invited Dolkun to speak at the United Nations, the Society for Threatened Peoples, be stripped of its accreditation. The United States sprung to Dolkun's defense, saying China was seeking to retaliate against an irritating advocate who has shed light on political repression against the Uighurs. The United States and Germany maintain that there is no evidence of links between the two groups.

=== Speaking in European Parliament ===
On 15 May 2018, on the occasion of a meeting of the Subcommittee on Human Rights (DROI), Dolkun, Vice-President of the Unrepresented Nations and Peoples Organization (UNPO) and President of the World Uyghur Congress (WUC), together with Sophie Richardson (then China Director of Human Rights Watch) and Ulrich Delius (Director of Society for Threatened Peoples), exchanged views on the human rights situation in China, with a special focus on Xinjiang.

=== Files criminal case in Argentina against China ===
In August 2022, Dolkun, Omer Kanat and Michael Polak submitted a criminal case against China in Buenos Aires, Argentina, for allegedly committing genocide and crimes against humanity against Uyghurs in northwestern China's Xinjiang region.

=== Other views ===
In 2025, Dolkun expressed concern with China's influence at the United Nations Human Rights Council and, according to Asian News International, "condemned the declining credibility of the UNHRC, pointing to the U.S. withdrawal from the Council as a move that allowed China and other authoritarian regimes to tighten their grip."

== Other incidents ==
=== South Korea entry denial ===
Dolkun was denied entry into the Republic of Korea and was briefly detained in September 2009 while preparing to attend the World Forum for Democratization in Asia. The Unrepresented Nations and Peoples Organization (UNPO) condemned the detention and warned the Korean government in a letter that China's accusations are groundless and that extradition would certainly result in summary trial and execution at the hands of China's authorities. After being held for two days, Dolkun was released without being admitted to the country, a move that was condemned by Amnesty International.

=== Indian visa withdrawal ===
On 22 April 2016, India had issued a visitor's visa to Dolkun to attend a conference in Dharamshala. This was viewed as a hardening of India's stance towards China since the Uyghur activist Rebiya Kadeer had previously been denied a visa to visit India. This move by the Indian Government was widely seen by Indian News Media as an act of payback against China for its stand on not supporting JeM Chief Masood Azhar's designation as a terrorist in the UNSC. The Indian government, in a U-turn from its earlier stance, later withdrew Dolkun's visa on 25 April 2016, a day after China raised objections to India.

=== Expulsion from UNPFII ===
On 26 April 2017, Dolkun, who had intended to participate in the United Nations Permanent Forum on Indigenous Issues (UNPFII), was forced to leave the UN premises. Dolkun was asked for his identification document by UN security and was then asked to leave the UN premises, denying Dolkun's request for an explanation. Dolkun was expelled from the building on behest of Chinese diplomat and UN DESA Under-Secretary-General Wu Hongbo, who in 2018 defended his action to a studio audience, saying: "When it comes to Chinese national sovereignty and security, we will undoubtedly defend our country's interests." Despite efforts by the UNPO and the Society for Threatened Peoples, under which Dolkun and fellow human rights activist Omer Kanat were accredited as participants in the Forum, Dolkun was not able to re-enter the building. Two days after the incident, on 28 April, he was denied a badge to be able to re-enter the UN and participate in the Forum.

=== Detention by police in Italy ===
On 26 July 2017, Dolkun was approached by 15-20 plainclothes members of the Divisione Investigazioni Generali e Operazioni Speciali (DIGOS) while walking with colleagues to the Italian Senate. The officers, who were holding a photo of Dolkun, stopped him at the gate of the senate building and asked him to accompany them for an identification check, Dolkun said. The officers loaded him into a car and took him to a nearby police station. The DIGOS police checked Dolkun's ID, took his photo and fingerprints, and eventually released him after 3:00 p.m.

== Death of Dolkun's mother ==
In late 2016 and early 2017, the Chinese government began a widespread campaign of repression against the Uyghur population in the Xinjiang Uyghur Autonomous Region (XUAR), which Dolkun and other activists refer to as East Turkestan. During this period, Isa’s family became victims of the escalating crackdown as authorities began detaining Uyghurs accused of harboring "extremist" and "politically incorrect" thoughts.

In an interview with Memory of Nations, Dolkun described how his communication with his parents abruptly changed in April 2017. Until that point, he had spoken to them regularly, despite surveillance:

“Before April 2017, we were in regular contact. I called them once or twice a week. The calls were monitored by the Chinese government, so we talked about general things. But by mid-April 2017, I felt my mother wanted to end the call very soon. She told me not to call her anymore. She said they were happy, they were fine. It was a signal, I understood that something serious was happening at home.”

When Dolkun attempted to call again two months later, the line had been disconnected. On 29 June 2018, Radio Free Asia reported that his mother, Ayhan Memet, had died while in Xinjiang, according to security officials. In June 2018, Dolkun learned from a close family friend that she died on 17 May at the age of 78, but the WUC president was unsure if she had been incarcerated in one of the many "political re-education camps" throughout the XUAR.

== Sexual harassment allegations ==
In 2024, Esma Gün, a Turkish-Belgian university student, publicly accused Dolkun of unwanted sexual advances. Gün, then 22 years old, alleged that Dolkun, aged 53 at the time, expressed his desire to kiss her in a conversation from February 2021. Despite Gün's rejection of his advances, Dolkun persisted, stating, "I would really want to kiss you without letting you go." Gün, feeling unsettled, attempted to limit her interactions with Dolkun. However, Dolkun continued to pressure her to meet, causing her discomfort and leading her to eventually withdraw from activism.

Although Gün did not immediately report the incident to the World Uyghur Congress and kept it hidden from other activists for years, she later came forward, expressing her reluctance to tarnish the reputation of the organization's leader. Gün stated that, "I didn't want people to know their leader is someone like this". Additionally, two other women, unaffiliated to Gün, spoke anonymously to NOTUS, alleging similar unprofessional behavior by Dolkun.

In response to the allegations, Dolkun made a public apology for his actions and impact on others on X, stating, "I have a duty to admit serious errors of judgement, for which I apologise without reservation. While I never acted upon them, I deeply regret sending messages that caused discomfort and distress. To those who received them, and to those in the community who feel understandably let down, I am sorry." He stepped down as president in August 2024. His replacement as World Uyghur Congress president is Turgunjan Alawdun, while Dolkun Isa now heads the Uyghur Center for Democracy and Human Rights (UZDM).
