= Jeff Daniels (director) =

American-Australian documentary film director

Jeff Daniels (born 1978) is an American-Australian documentary film director and producer.

== Early life ==
Daniels was born in 1978 and raised in Queens, New York. He moved to Australia in 2001 and now lives in Melbourne.

== Career ==
Daniels made his first film, The 10 Conditions of Love over seven years while working as a school teacher in Melbourne. An observational film about exiled Uyghur activist and human rights leader, Rebiya Kadeer, the film made international headlines after Chinese hackers attacked the Melbourne International Film Festival website, in an attempt to disrupt its screening. Several Chinese directors withdrew their films from the festival in response to the planned screening of Daniels' film.

Fair Game follows the life and career of AFL footballer, Héritier Lumumba who spoke out about racism in the Collingwood Football Club. The film uncovered systemic racism present within the club and was cited in a subsequent review into the club's response to incidents of racism and cultural safety. The report found the club was "at best ineffective, or at worst exacerbated the impact of the racist incidents". A week after the report's findings were leaked, the club's president Eddie McGuire resigned.

Mother with a Gun won Best Australian Documentary at the 2016 Antenna Documentary Film Festival and was selected for the documentary film festival, DOC NYC. The film follows leader of the Jewish Defense League, Shelley Rubin, on her path to violent extremism.

Television Event is an archive-based documentary tracing the production and socio-political reception of 1983 made-for-TV movie, The Day After. The Day After controversially imagined a nuclear attack on Lawrence, Kansas and its broadcast reached over 100 million Americans. Daniels' film depicts the anxious reaction to The Day After and the change it engendered in president Ronald Reagan's nuclear weapons policy. The film was set to have its world premiere at the Tribeca Film Festival in 2020 but did not screen there until 2021 due to the COVID-19 pandemic. For it, Daniels won Best Director of a Documentary Feature at RiverRun Film Festival.

== Filmography ==
=== Feature-length films ===
- The 10 Conditions of Love (2009)
- Mother with a Gun (2016)
- Fair Game (2017)
- Television Event (2020)

=== Awards ===
Year	Nominee / work	Award	Result
2024	Welcome to Yiddishland	Sydney Film Festival Documentary Australia Award	Nominated
2022	Television Event	Pyeongchang International Film Festival Grand Jury Prize	Won
2022	Television Event	Uranium International Film Festival Best Feature Documentary	Won
2021	Television Event	Cinema for Peace Foundation Award for Most Valuable Documentary	Nominated
2021	Television Event	Atom Award for Best History Documentary	Nominated
2021	Television Event	Hot Springs Documentary Film Festival Award for Best Documentary Feature	Nominated
2021	Television Event	Sydney Film Festival Award for Best Australian Documentary	Nominated
2021	Television Event	Philadelphia Film Festival Award for Best Feature Documentary	Nominated
2021	Television Event	Newport Beach Film Festival Award for Best Feature Documentary	Nominated
2021	Television Event	Footcandle Film Festival Audience Favourite Feature Award	Won
2021	Television Event	Sidewalk Film Festival Programmers' Feature Film Award	Won
2021	Television Event	RiverRun Film Festival Award for Best Director of a Documentary Feature	Won
2021	Television Event	Full Frame Center for Documentary Filmmakers Award	Nominated
2018	Fair Game	Australian Directors' Guild Award for Best Director	Nominated
2018	Fair Game	Atom Award for Best Social & Political Issue Documentary	Nominated
2016	Mother with a Gun	Antenna Award for Best Documentary	Won
2011	The 10 Conditions of Love	Bellingham Film Festival Audience Award for Best Film	Won
2010	The 10 Conditions of Love	Atom Award for Best Social & Political Issue Documentary	Won
2010	The 10 Conditions of Love	Inside Film Awards Independent Spirit Award	Nominated
2010	The 10 Conditions of Love	FCCA Award for Best Documentary Director	Nominated
2010	The 10 Conditions of Love	Melbourne International Film Festival Audience Award	Nominated
