= Turghunjan Alawudun =

Uyghur politician and political activist

- تۇرگۇنجان ئالاۋۇدۇن

4rd President of the World Uyghur Congress
- Incumbent
- Assumed office 26 October 2024
- Preceded by: Dolkun Isa

Personal details
- Born: 22 May 1966 (age 60) Xinjiang,China
- Education: Al-Azhar University

Turghunjan Alawudun (Uyghur: تۇرگۇنجان ئالاۋۇدۇن; born 1966) a Uyghur politician and political activist based in Germany, who has been serving as the president of the World Uyghur Congress since October 26, 2024.
