= Television Event =

- Directed by: Jeff Daniels
- Produced by: Jeff Daniels; Ozzy Inguanzo; Amanda Spain
- Cinematography: Nick Higgins
- Edited by: Eileen Meyer; Aaron Wickenden
- Music by: T. Griffin
- Production companies: Impact Partners; Screen Australia; Common Room Productions
- Release date: November 11, 2020 (DOC NYC)
- Running time: 90 minutes
- Countries: United States; Australia
- Language: English

Television Event is a 2020 American-Australian documentary film, directed and produced by Jeff Daniels. It follows the making and release of the 1983 film The Day After directed by Nicholas Meyer, which revolved around a nuclear war and was controversial upon release.

It had its world premiere at DOC NYC on November 11, 2020.

== Synopsis ==
The film follows the production and making of The Day After, a TV movie directed by Nicholas Meyer, which revolved around a nuclear war and received controversy upon release. Appearing were Meyer, Edward Hume, Stephanie Austin, Ellen Anthony, Ted Koppel, Stu Samuels, Robert Papazian, Walton Dornisch, David Longhurst, and Mark Weinberg, while Brandon Stoddard appears through archive footage.

== Release ==
Television Event had its world premiere at DOC NYC on November 11, 2020. In May 2021, the film went on to screen at the RiverRun International Film Festival, where Jeff Daniels received the award for Best Feature Documentary Director. The film screened at the Full Frame Documentary Film Festival on June 2, 2021. It also screened at the Tribeca Film Festival on June 13, 2021, after it was previously set to make its world premiere at the festival in April 2020, prior to its cancellation due to the COVID-19 pandemic. The Nantucket Film Festival also announced Television Event's selection as part of its lineup for June 2021.

== Critical reception ==
Television Event received positive reviews from film critics. On Rotten Tomatoes, it holds a 92% approval rating, based on reviews from 12 critics, with an average rating of 7.9 out of 10.

=== Awards ===
Year	Nominee / work	Award	Result
2022	Television Event	Uranium International Film Festival Best Feature Documentary	Won
2021	Television Event	Cinema for Peace Foundation Award for Most Valuable Documentary	Nominated
2021	Television Event	Atom Award for Best History Documentary	Nominated
2021	Television Event	Hot Springs Documentary Film Festival Award for Best Documentary Feature	Nominated
2021	Television Event	Sydney Film Festival Award for Best Australian Documentary	Nominated
2021	Television Event	Philadelphia Film Festival Award for Best Feature Documentary	Nominated
2021	Television Event	Newport Beach Film Festival Award for Best Feature Documentary	Nominated
2021	Television Event	Footcandle Film Festival Audience Favourite Feature Award	Won
2021	Television Event	Sidewalk Film Festival Programmers' Feature Film Award	Won
2021	Television Event	RiverRun Film Festival Award for Best Director of a Documentary Feature	Won
2021	Television Event	Full Frame Center for Documentary Filmmakers Award	Nominated
