= Uyghur Human Rights Policy Act =

US law on Xinjiang human rights

Uyghur Human Rights Policy Act of 2020
- Long title: An act to condemn gross human rights violations of ethnic Turkic Muslims in Xinjiang, and calling for an end to arbitrary detention, torture, and harassment of these communities inside and outside China.
- Nicknames: Uyghur Act
- Enacted by: the 116th United States Congress
- Effective: June 17, 2020

Citations
- Public law: Pub. L. 116–145 (text) (PDF)

Legislative history
- Introduced in the Senate as S. 3744 by Marco Rubio (R-FL) on May 14, 2020; Passed the Senate on May 14, 2020 (Unanimous consent); Passed the House on May 27, 2020 (413–1); Signed into law by President Donald Trump on June 17, 2020

The Uyghur Human Rights Policy Act of 2020 (S. 3744) is a United States federal law that requires various United States government bodies to report on human rights abuses by the Chinese Communist Party (CCP) and the Chinese government against Uyghurs in Xinjiang, China, including the Xinjiang re-education camps.

On September 11, 2019, a version of the bill—the Uyghur Human Rights Policy Act of 2019—was passed in the United States Senate by unanimous consent. On December 3, 2019, a stronger version of the bill—the UIGHUR Act—was passed by the United States House of Representatives by a vote of 407–1.

On May 14, 2020, the Senate introduced and approved what would be the current 2020 bill. On May 27, 2020, the House passed the amended bill by a vote of 413–1, sending it to then-President Donald Trump for approval. The bill was signed by Trump into law on June 17, 2020.

== Background ==
In 2014 the Chinese government introduced the Strike Hard Campaign Against Violent Terrorism in reaction to several terrorist attacks with responsibility claimed by Uyghur separatist groups and exile groups. Beginning in 2017, under Xinjiang CCP Secretary Chen Quanguo, the government incarcerated over an estimated one million Uyghurs without legal process in re-education camps officially described as "vocational education and training centers". China began to wind down the camps in 2019. According to Amnesty International, detainees have been increasingly transferred to the formal penal system. In addition to mass detention, government policies have included forced labor and factory work, suppression of Uyghur religious practices, political indoctrination, forced sterilization, forced contraception, and forced abortion.

== Legislative history ==
Draft of the bill from September 2019 in the Congressional Record (Vol. 165 pages S5450-S5452)

On September 11, 2019, a version of the bill—S. 178, the Uyghur Human Rights Policy Act of 2019—passed in the US Senate by unanimous consent.

On December 3, 2019, a stronger, amended version of the bill—the Uighur Intervention and Global Humanitarian Unified Response Act (or UIGHUR Act)—was passed by the US House of Representatives by a vote of 407 to 1. The sole "no" vote was cast by Thomas Massie, Republican of Kentucky.

On the afternoon of May 14, 2020, a new version of the bill—S. 3744, the Uyghur Human Rights Policy Act of 2020—passed in the US Senate by unanimous consent. The US House of Representatives approved the bill by a vote of 413–1 on May 27, 2020. The following month, on June 17, then-President Donald Trump signed the bill into law. The National Defense Authorization Act for Fiscal Year 2025 extended the act's expiration date from 2025 to 2030.

== Legislation content and results ==
The bill directs: (1) the Director of National Intelligence to report to Congress on security issues caused by the Chinese government's reported crackdown on Uyghurs in Xinjiang; (2) the Federal Bureau of Investigation to report on efforts to protect Uyghurs and Chinese nationals in the United States; (3) the US Agency for Global Media to report on Chinese media related issues in Xinjiang; and (4) the United States Department of State to report on the scope of the reported Chinese government crackdown on Uyghurs in Xinjiang.

The President has to submit a report to Congress within 180 days. The report shall designate Chinese officials and any other individuals who are responsible for carrying out: torture; prolonged detention without charges and a trial; abduction; cruel, inhumane, or degrading treatment of Muslim minority groups; and other flagrant denials of the "right to life, liberty, or the security" of people in Xinjiang. Persons identified in the report would then be subject to sanctions which include asset blocking, visa revocation, and ineligibility for entry into the United States. Imposing sanctions against the officials can be declined by the President if he determines and certifies to Congress that holding back on sanctions is in the national interest of the United States.

The bill also calls on the President to impose sanctions under the Global Magnitsky Act on Xinjiang Communist Party Secretary Chen Quanguo, which would be the first time such sanctions would be imposed on a member of China's politburo. On July 9, 2020, the Trump administration imposed sanctions and visa restrictions against senior Chinese officials, including Quanguo, as well as Zhu Hailun, Wang Mingshan (王明山), and Huo Liujun (霍留军). With sanctions, they and their immediate relatives are barred from entering the US and will have US-based assets frozen.

In December 2021, the Uyghur Forced Labor Prevention Act was passed. The act discussed the US' responsibility (as well as Mexico's and Canada's) in preventing forced labor and human trafficking for labor. The act imposes sanctions and some prohibitions on listed companies in the region in line with Section 307 of the Tariff Act of 1930. On November 25, 2024, the largest expansion of the list of companies not complying with the act was passes by the US Department of Homeland Security. In April 2024 a new act was introduced to Congress titled Uyghur Genocide Accountability and Sanctions Act of 2024. This act proposes new, more severe, amendments to the Uyghur Human Rights Policy Act of 2020.

== Reactions ==
=== Support ===
On the same day that then-President Trump signed the Act into law, former National Security Advisor John Bolton claimed that Trump had, on two occasions, told Chinese leader Xi Jinping to go forward with plans related to Uyghur internment.

Editorials in The New York Times and The Washington Post supported the passage of the Uyghur Human Rights Policy Act. Opinion pieces written in various publications also supported the passage of the Act.

The CCP claim of deradicalization drew criticism in an article by the Deccan Chronicle, while an article written by Srikanth Kondapalli made criticisms of the PRC's grand strategy for Xinjiang. Analysts cited in an article by Reuters said that mainland China's response to passage of the Uyghur bill could be stronger than its reaction to the Hong Kong Human Rights and Democracy Act, while the BBC's China correspondent said that if the bill became law, then it would mark the most significant international attempt to pressure mainland China over its mass detention of the Uyghurs.

==== Uyghur community ====
On December 3, 2019, a World Uyghur Congress spokesman said that the House bill is important in opposing "China's continued push of extreme persecution," and that the organization looks forward to Trump signing the bill. Various Uyghur activists, think tank analysts, and political representatives called on various governments to sanction mainland Chinese officials for their perceived involvement in the Xinjiang conflict. Nury Turkel, former President of the Uyghur American Association, thanked Trump for signing the Act and urged Congress to pass a second Uyghur-related bill, the Uyghur Forced Labor Prevention Act which passed in 2021.

=== Opposition ===
The Chinese government have called the bill a malicious attack on China and demanded that the United States prevent it from becoming law, warning that it would act to defend its interests as necessary. On December 4, 2019, Chinese Foreign Ministry spokesperson Hua Chunying said that the bill "wantonly smeared China's counter-terrorism and de-radicalization efforts." Four days later, Ëziz Eli (艾则孜·艾力)—County Magistrate of Niya County and Vice Secretary of the Niya County County Communist Party Committee—and Perhat Roza (帕尔哈提·肉孜)—Vice Secretary and Commissioner of the Kashgar Prefecture Communist Party Committee—penned criticisms of the Act. State media commentator and then-editor-in-chief of the CCP-owned tabloid Global Times, Hu Xilin, incorporated the bill's passage into his nationalist rhetoric and criticized it as another example of an anti-China legislation.

In December 2019, the Syrian Ministry of Foreign Affairs and Expatriates defended China's actions in Xinjiang and condemned the bill as a "blatant interference by the US in the internal affairs of the People's Republic of China."

== See also ==
- United States foreign policy toward the People's Republic of China
  - United States sanctions against China
- Uyghur Forced Labor Prevention Act
