= No Escape: The True Story of China's Genocide of the Uyghurs =

2022 non-fiction book by Nury Turkel

- Author: Nury Turkel
- Subject: Persecution of Uyghurs in China
- Genre: Non-fiction
- Published: May 10, 2022
- Publisher: HarperCollins
- Publication date: 2022
- Pages: 352
- ISBN: 9781335469564

No Escape: The True Story of China's Genocide of the Uyghurs is a 2022 book by Nury Turkel.

== Publication ==
Written by Nury Turkel, a Uyghur and a commissioner at the United States Commission on International Religious Freedom. Wall Street Journal described Turkel as "the first Uyghur-American to rise to a political position in the U.S."

== Synopsis ==
No Escape documents the history of Uyghurs in what is now northwest China, Mongolia and eastern Kazakhstan. In the book, Turkel explains how Uyghurs historically tended to refer to themselves as yerlik (English: locals). Turkel states that China imprisoned Ilham Tohti to prevent him speaking out about the treatment of Uyghurs. He writes that China's decision to imprison Tohti was a decision made to avoid him becoming a global spokes person for the Uyghurs akin to how the Dalai Lama does for Tibet.

The book documents the government of China's actions in Xinjiang including forced sterilizations to drive the Han Chinese population up compared to the Uyghur. Apartheid, torture, "re-education", mosque destruction, Mandarin replacing Uyghur language in schools, government surveillance, forced consumption of alcohol, sexual assault Turkel praises Mike Pompeo for calling the actions genocide and praises Joe Biden for passing the Uyghur Forced Labor Prevention Act.

== Critical reception ==
The Wall Street Journal describe the book as a "harrowing mix of factual detail and depictions of everyday life".

The book won the 2022 Moore Prize for Human Rights Writing.
