= Rebiya Kadeer =

Uyghur political activist (born 1946)

- رابىيە قادىر 热比娅·卡德尔
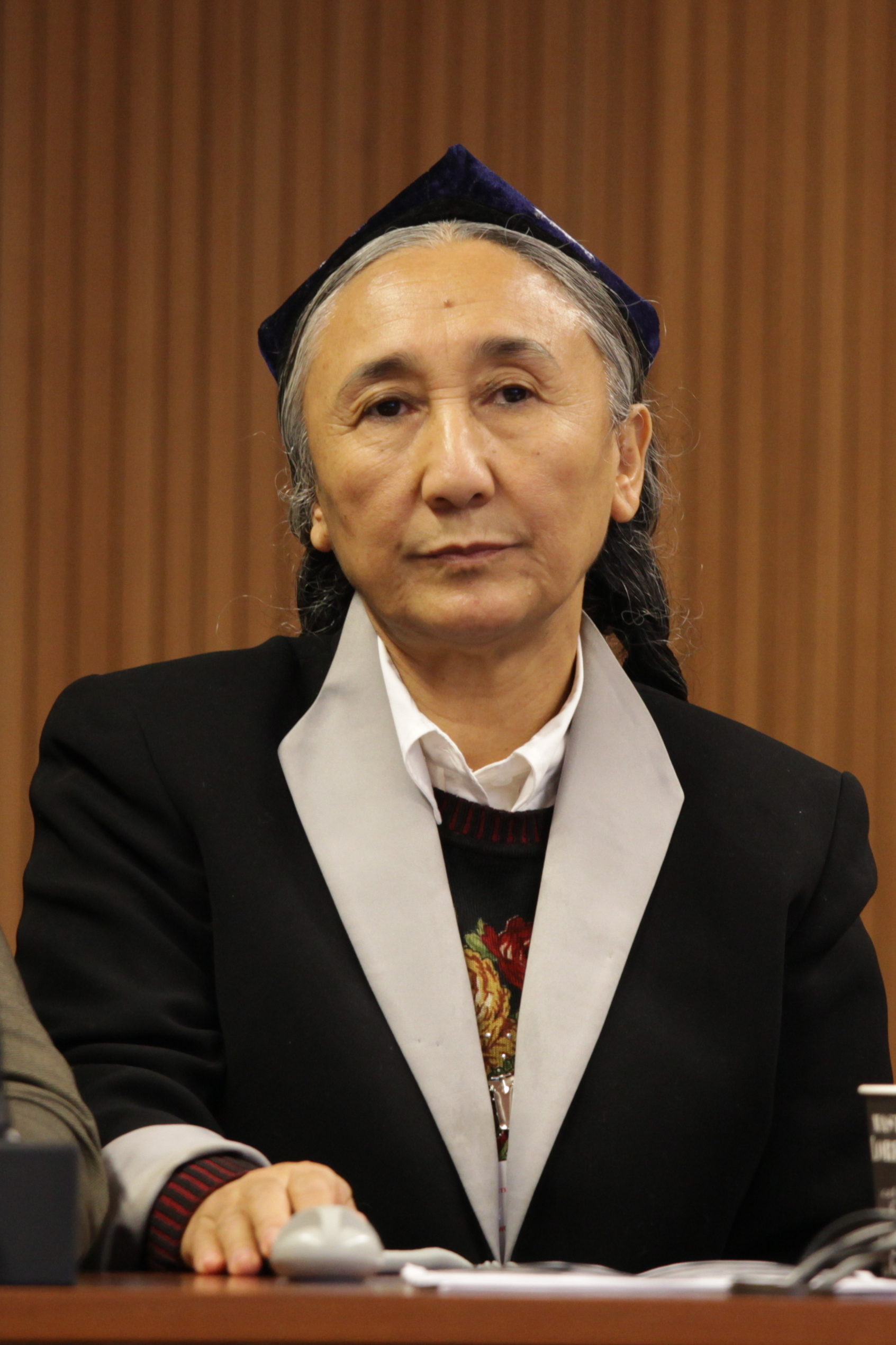
- Kadeer in 2012

2nd President of the World Uyghur Congress
- In office 27 November 2006 – 12 November 2017
- Preceded by: Erkin Alptekin
- Succeeded by: Dolkun Isa

President of the Uyghur American Association
- In office 2006–2011

Member of the 8th Chinese People's Political Consultative Conference
- In office March 1993 – March 1998

Personal details
- Born: 15 November 1946 (age 80) Altay City, Altay Prefecture, Xinjiang, China
- Party: Chinese Communist Party (expelled 1999)
- Spouse(s): Abdurehim Tohti (m. 1962, div. 1977), Sidik Haji Rozi (m. 1981)
- Children: 6 (with Abdurehim Tohti), 5 (with Sidik Rozi)
- Occupation: Political activist
- Known for: Former President of the World Uyghur Congress (2006.11 – 2017.11); Nobel Peace Prize Nominee (5 times)
- Website: World Uyghur Congress website

Rebiya Kadeer (Uyghur: رابىيە قادىر, romanized: Rabiye Qadir; born 15 November 1946) is an ethnic Uyghur Chinese businesswoman and political activist. Born in Altay City, Xinjiang, China, Kadeer became a millionaire in the 1980s through her real estate holdings and ownership of a multinational conglomerate. Kadeer held various positions in the National People's Congress in Beijing and other political institutions before being arrested in 1999 for, according to Chinese state media, sending confidential internal reference reports to her husband, who worked in the United States as a pro-East Turkistan independence broadcaster. After she fled to the United States in 2005 on compassionate release, Kadeer assumed leadership positions in overseas Uyghur organizations such as the World Uyghur Congress.

== Early life and career ==
Rebiya Kadeer was born in the city of Altay in Xinjiang. Along with her mother and siblings, she moved to Wensu County of Aksu to join her elder sister, who already lived there. In April 1962, she married her first husband, her sister's neighbor Abdurehim Tohti, after he pitied them and offered them accommodation.

=== Family history ===
According to her autobiography, Dragon Fighter: One Woman's Epic Struggle for Peace with China, her family were descendants of migrants who moved across the Tianshan Mountains to Gulja, Merket was the hometown of her mother's father and Khotan was the hometown of her father's parents.

According to her autobiography, Rebiya Kadeer's father served with pro-Soviet Uyghur rebels under the Second East Turkestan Republic in the Ili Rebellion (Three Province Rebellion) in 1944–1946, using Soviet assistance and aid to fight the Republic of China government under Chiang Kai-shek. Kadeer and her family were close friends with White Russian exiles living in Xinjiang and Kadeer recalled that many Uyghurs thought Russian culture was "more advanced" than that of the Uyghurs and they "respected" the Russians a lot.

=== First marriage ===
Due to poverty, Rebiya had to enter her first marriage as a housewife and gave birth to six children from 1964 to 1976. But at some point she began independently making and selling clothes and other small articles for additional income.

During the Chinese cultural revolution she was suppressed for her efforts, as the Chinese government attempted to break up her family. She claims that the Chinese government told her ex-husband to divorce her. She recounts "They put pressure on him to divorce me because they accused me of secretly doing business. They said that it was wrong for me to do secret business."

=== Entrepreneurship ===
Following her divorce, Kadeer opened a laundry service in 1976. She later remarried in 1981 to Sidik Haji Rouzi, then an associate professor, who is divorced by his ex-wife Mehmusa, a colleague of Rebiya's elder sister, for his activism. They moved to Ürümqi, having 5 children together.

After the collapse of the Soviet Union, Kadeer engaged in cross-border trade, accumulating assets which at their peak were worth more than 200 million yuan. She became one of the five richest people in China, and her success earned her the nickname "the millionairess". The trading company she operated had businesses in China, Russia and Kazakhstan. Kadeer founded the Akida Industry and Trade Co, which owns a number of properties in Xinjiang province. These include The Akida Trade Center, the adjacent Kadeer Trade Center and the Tuanjie, or Unity, theatre in Ürümqi.

Kadeer was an active philanthropist within the community, most notably through her foundation, 1,000 Mothers Movement, a charity intended to help Uyghur women start their own local businesses, as well as support underprivileged and orphaned Uyghur children.

=== As Chinese politician ===
Kadeer was not always at odds with the government, and was once welcomed as an appointed delegate to the eighth session of the Chinese People's Political Consultative Conference, the National People's Congress and was a representative to the UN Fourth World Conference for Women in Beijing in 1995. She was also a Communist Party member until she was expelled. Kadeer has also served as vice chairwoman of the Xinjiang Autonomous Region Federation of Industry and Commerce, and vice chairwoman of the Xinjiang Association of Women Entrepreneurs. Kadeer wrote that her career was significantly affected by the 1997 Jiashi earthquakes, which were "one of the worst natural disasters that had occurred in the Uyghur nation in recent memory." One hundred villages and one thousand homes were leveled. Kadeer organized donations and aid for the area.

=== Imprisonment ===
In 1996, her husband and Uyghur independence activist Sidiq Rouzi left China for the United States, working as a broadcaster for the US radio stations Radio Free Asia and Voice of America. Kadeer's failure to denounce Rouzi's anti-China activities and repeated polemics against the government's ethnic policies in the national parliament led her not to be reelected to the National People's Consultative Conference in 1998.

Although large newspapers such as the People's Daily or Xinjiang Daily downplay news about separatism or terrorism in Xinjiang, trusted government employees (as Kadeer once was) have access to neican ("internal reference reports"), which freely report on issues of concern to national security. Kadeer funneled Rouzi two years' worth of the neican publications Kashgar Daily, Xinjiang Legal News, Yining Daily, and Yining Evening News, with a focus on separatists' speeches. As Kashgar and Ghulja (Yining) are the two areas where separatist attacks are the most common, and Xinjiang Legal News contains extensive police reports on the government's counterterrorist operations, the government prepared to charge her with the offense of "passing on classified information to foreigners". Kadeer was arrested in August 1999 while on her way to meet a US Congressional Research Service, with the additional charge of being in contact with nearly a dozen separatists. She was tried in March 2000 in the Ürümqi Intermediate People's Court and convicted of violating article 111 of China's criminal code governing the leaking of state secrets. Kadeer's imprisonment in the Liudaowan prison in Ürümqi became a cause célèbre in the British and American parliaments. She won the Rafto Prize for human rights while imprisoned and she claims that she was not tortured in prison because of her newfound international reputation. In the same year, her sentence was reduced by a year based on citations of good behavior where she was being held.

== Release and later career ==
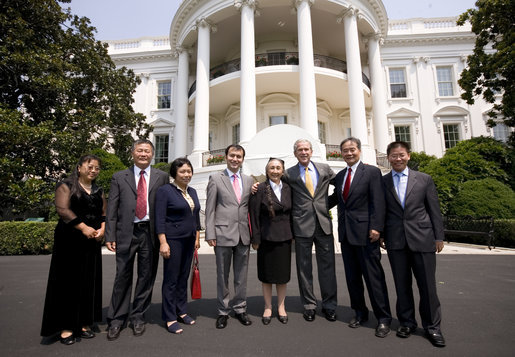
July 2008, Rebiya Kadeer met with George W. Bush in White House

On 14 March 2005, Kadeer was released early on medical grounds, into United States' custody in advance of a visit by U.S. Secretary of State Condoleezza Rice to the region. The U.S., which had pressured for her release, agreed to drop a resolution against China in the United Nations Commission on Human Rights. On 17 March, Kadeer flew to the U.S. and joined her family in Washington, D.C.

In November 2006, she became the president of the separatist World Uyghur Congress, and later also became president of the Uyghur American Association. In April 2007, one of her sons, Ablikim, was sentenced to 9 years in prison and 3 years deprivation of political rights, reportedly after confessing to charges of "instigating and engaging in secessionist activities." In November 2006 Alim, another of her sons, was sentenced to 7 years in prison and fined $62,500. Both were allegedly beaten and tortured in custody. Qahar Abdurehim, yet another of her sons, was fined $12,500 for tax evasion but not jailed. In June 2006, Alim, Ablikim, and Qahar were officially charged with state security and economic crimes.

The Chinese government characterizes Kadeer as "an ironclad separatist colluding with terrorists and Islamic extremists." In 2007 Kadeer expressed doubt about a police raid on a terrorist camp, reiterating her assertion that Uyghur organizations are not terrorist organizations, and instead fight peacefully. On 5 June 2007, at a conference on democracy and security held in Prague, Kadeer and other global political dissidents met with President George W. Bush, who praised the talent of people like her for being "the greatest resource of their nations, far more valuable than the weapons of their army or their oil under the ground." On 17 September 2007, the United States House of Representatives passed by a voice vote House Resolution 497, demanding that the Chinese Government release the imprisoned children of Rebiya Kadeer and Canadian citizen Huseyin Celil, and change its suppressive policy towards the Uyghur people.

Rebiya Kadeer claimed that Turkey is hampered from interfering with Uyghurs because it recognizes that its own Kurdish issue may get interfered with by China in retaliation.

=== July 2009 riots ===
While the protests that preceded the July 2009 riots were ostensibly a response to the death of two Uyghur workers in Guangdong, the Chinese government catapulted Kadeer into the limelight when it claimed the WUC, which she heads, had planned the riots. Taiwan denied a visa to Kadeer in September 2009, alleging she had links to the East Turkestan Islamic Movement, which is classed as a terrorist organization by the United Nations and USA. Kadeer has denied the charges.

On 3 August, Xinhua reported that two of Rebiya Kadeer's children had written letters blaming her for orchestrating the riots. According to Xinhua, they pleaded: "We want a stable and safe life … Please think about the happiness of us and your grandchildren. Don't destroy our happy life here. Don't follow the provocation from some people in other countries." Germany-based spokesman for the WUC rejected the letters as fakes. A Human Rights Watch researcher remarked their style was "suspiciously close" to the way the Chinese authorities had described rioting in Xinjiang and the aftermath. CCTV broadcast a video of interviews with the family members of Kadeer on 4 August.

Xinhua announced in early September 2009 that three properties owned by Kadeer's companies, including the Akida Trade Center, where more than 30 members of Kadeer's family were reportedly living, would be torn down due to "cracks in the walls and sunken footings".

=== The 10 Conditions of Love ===
In 2009, Jeff Daniels made a documentary film, The 10 Conditions of Love, about Kadeer. Its premiere was scheduled for the Melbourne International Film Festival, the organizers of which refused a request from the Chinese consulate in Melbourne for the film to be withdrawn and for Kadeer's invitation to the festival to be rescinded. Several Chinese directors pulled out of the event. The festival website was hacked and festival information replaced with the Chinese flag and anti-Kadeer slogans. All film sessions were falsely shown as booked out on the site, and a denial-of-service attack forced it to shut down.

The documentary was scheduled to be shown at the Kaoshiung Film Festival, Taiwan, in October 2009, but was later rescheduled to September, before the festival. Wang Yi of the Taiwan Affairs Office of the State Council opposed the film, saying it "beatifies the ethnic separatists" and sends "the wrong signals about terrorism and violence", while the Chinese government warned the Kaoshiung city government not to "stir up trouble". The website for the festival was also hacked. It was later announced that the film would be shown at the film festival as originally planned, but Kadeer's entry ban from Taiwan was extended by three years "based on security needs".

=== Position on Chinese Uyghur independence ===
In 2011, Rebiya Kadeer accused the Chinese government of intentionally cultivating multiple Uyghur governments in exile in order to divide the Uyghur people. She believes that independence movements have less support in the international community and the given autonomy by Chinese laws were never implemented. She said that the Uyghur people were never happy under the Chinese rule.

=== Appeal to Japan for support ===
In May 2012, while in Tokyo for a conference visit, Kadeer called on the Japanese government to raise with Beijing the subject of human rights violations in China. She also visited the controversial Yasukuni Shrine and reportedly expressed that she wanted to establish a similar place dedicated to Uyghur heroes in the future.

== Works ==
- with Cavelius, Alexandra (2008). Die Himmelsstürmerin: Chinas Staatsfeindin Nr. 1 erzählt aus ihrem Leben. Heyne. ISBN 978-3-453-64041-2. (German)

The bestseller, which has been translated into many languages, was written by the author Alexandra Cavelius on the basis of numerous interviews with Rebiya Kadeer.

- English edition: Dragon Fighter: One Woman's Epic Struggle for Peace with China. W. W. Norton & Company, Inc. ISBN 978-0-9798456-1-1.

== See also ==
- Rushan Abbas
- Uyghur Americans
- Uyghur American Association
