= Erkin Alptekin =

Uyghur political activist (born 1939)

- ئەركىن ئالپتەكىن

1st President of the World Uyghur Congress
- In office 18 April 2004 – 27 November 2006
- Preceded by: Congress established
- Succeeded by: Rebiya Kadeer

Personal details
- Born: 4 July 1939 (age 86) Yengisar County, Kashgar Prefecture, Xinjiang, Republic of China
- Citizenship: Germany
- Parent: Isa Alptekin (father)
- Occupation: Political activist
- Known for: Founder and 1st President of the WUC; One of the founders and 3rd President of UNPO
- Website: World Uyghur Congress website

Erkin Alptekin (Uyghur: ئەركىن ئالپتەكىن Еркин Алптекин; Chinese: 艾尔肯·阿布甫泰肯; born 4 July 1939) is a Uyghur activist from Germany. Alptekin is the son of Isa Alptekin, who was a prominent Uyghur politician in the Chinese Nationalist government. He has played very important roles for the foundation of some international organizations, the best known of which are the Unrepresented Nations and Peoples Organization (UNPO) and the World Uyghur Congress.

== Biography ==
After the incorporation of Xinjiang in 1949 by the new People's Republic of China, Alptekin's family fled to Srinagar in Jammu and Kashmir. There he attended Catholic school and then Convent College, completing his studies in the Institute of Journalism in Istanbul. Alptekin is based in Germany.

== Career ==
In 1971, due to his father's connections, he got a job at Radio Free Europe/Radio Liberty (RFE/RL) in Munich. He worked as a "Senior Policy Advisor" and directed the Uyghur Division until 1979, when Uyghur-language broadcasts were discontinued for a lack of an audience under RFE/RL jurisdiction. During his time at the Division, he complained about lack of media coverage of the Uyghurs, lamenting "the international community only reacts when conflict breaks out." He retired his RFE/RL post in 1995 as it moved to Prague in the Czech Republic.

Erkin Alptekin has founded various organizations for separatist movements, mostly related to the Uyghur nationalist cause. In 1985 he participated in the founding of the "Allied Committee of the Peoples of East Turkestan, Tibet and Inner Mongolia", which held its first conference in 1998 in New York. He founded the East Turkestan Union in Europe. In 1991, he also became one of the founders of the Unrepresented Nations and Peoples Organization (UNPO), which has its headquarters in The Hague. During a conference held in Munich in April 2004 Alptekin was elected the President of the World Uyghur Congress.

Erkin Alptekin has been lobbying, not only for Uyghur nationalism but also for other separatist movements, peoples and minorities, including the indigenous peoples in Western countries since 1971.

Erkin Alptekin is also on the advisory board of several international organizations situated in Asia, Europe and in the United States. For the last 35 years Alptekin has attended more than 6,000 international conferences worldwide on various topics; published numerous articles, research papers and brochures; and has been the focus of several Western press media.
