= Uyghur Human Rights Project =

Cultural and political organization

- Abbreviation: UHRP
- Formation: 2004; 22 years ago
- Type: 501(c)(3) organization
- Tax ID no.: 47-5609093
- Headquarters: Washington, D.C., United States
- Region served: International
- Official languages: English, Uyghur, Mandarin Chinese
- Executive Director: Omer Kanat
- Website: www.uhrp.org

The Uyghur Human Rights Project (Chinese: 维吾尔人权项目, Uyghur: ئۇيغۇر كىشىلىك ھوقۇق قۇرۇلۇشى; abbreviated UHRP) is a research-based advocacy organization located in Washington, D.C. that promotes human rights for Uyghurs. According to the UHRP, its main goal is "promoting human rights and democracy for Uyghurs and others living in East Turkistan" through research-based advocacy.

Due to challenges in collecting information regarding China, the group states that organizations focusing on the Uyghur crisis are especially important, in addition to organizations that focus on human rights more broadly. The organization also hosts events, like panels of experts, to discuss the crisis facing the Uyghurs.

== History ==
Uyghur Human Rights Project was founded in 2004 by the Uyghur American Association, and have eight full-time staff. The project was founded with a grant from the National Endowment for Democracy, and became a 501(c)(3) nonprofit, tax-exempt organization in 2016.

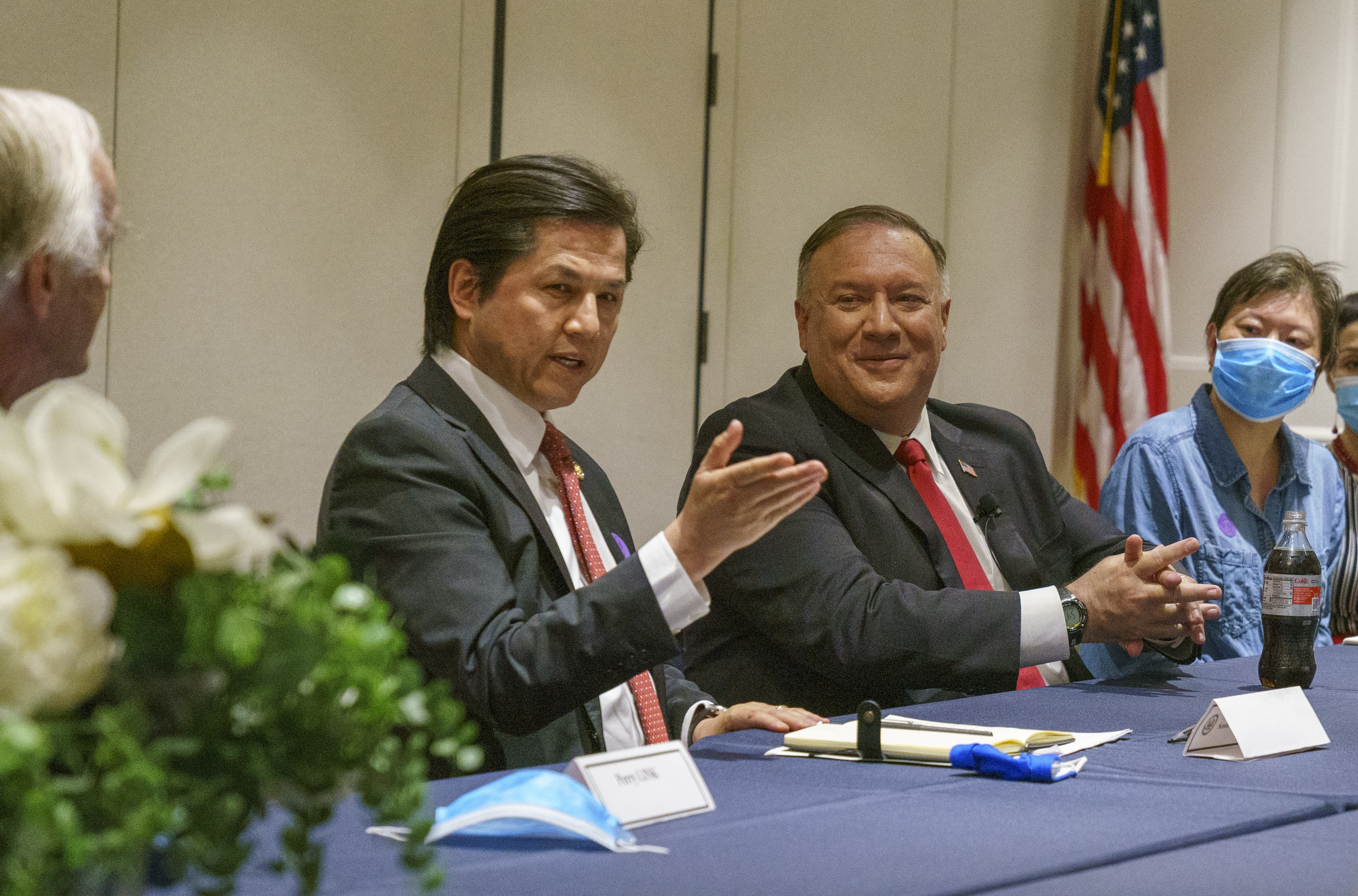
US Secretary of State Michael Pompeo meets with Nury Turkel and Chinese dissidents in July 2020

Omer Kanat has been the organization's Executive Director since 2018. He previously served as the World Uyghur Congress (WUC) Vice President from 2006 to 2017, and has also been a WUC Executive Committee Chairman since 2017. Co-founder Nury Turkel also served as board chair, and was appointed by the U.S. House of Representatives Speaker Nancy Pelosi as a commissioner on the U.S. Commission on International Religious Freedom (2019–2022).

The group also joined with fifty other organizations and experts in September 2020 to call on the UN Human Rights Council to appoint a Commission of Inquiry to investigate atrocity crimes against Uyghurs and other Turkic Muslim peoples. In January 2022, the group wrote to Senate Majority Leader Chuck Schumer in support of the Open App Markets Act, arguing that the bill's sideloading protections will help Chinese citizens bypass censorship.

UHRP maintains a bill tracker on Uyghur-related matters before the U.S. Congress, maintains a list of U.S. sanctions on companies suspected of violating human Uyghur rights in China, hosts events on China's actions in Xinjiang, and tracks international responses to Uyghur human rights issues in China.

UHRP has documented the Chinese Communist Party's use of transnational repression against Uyghurs and the CCP's evolving strategy to harass, intimidate, and silence Uyghurs abroad. The organization has also expressed concern that the U.S. Department of Homeland Security is not fully implementing the Uyghur Forced Labor Prevention Act, calling on the organization to make full use of its “entity list” to designate companies that are in violation of the act.

In 2023, UHRP signed a letter to Biden administration Secretary of State Antony Blinken prior to Blinken's June 2023 visit to China asking him to support international investigation into the Xinjiang and call on Chinese authorities to release human rights criminals.

In 2022, UHRP supported the Uyghur Policy Act, which would have created a special coordinator for Uyghur Issues at the U.S. Department of State, direct the U.S. Agency for Global Media to disseminate information on Uyghurs and other minority groups to Islamic countries, and raise Uyghur issues at the United Nations. The bill was co-sponsored to by U.S. Rep. Young Kim (R-CA) and Rep. Ami Bera (D-CA).

In May 2024, NOTUS reported instances of alleged sexual harassment from then Executive Board Chair Nury Turkel, naming instances in both 2019 and 2022. These allegations were brought forward to UHRP's board by the organisation's Government Relations Manager Julie Millsap. Ms Millsap was fired from her role in July 2024, and was notified in writing that the UHRP board was troubled by her "air[ing] grievances".

In January 2025, salaried staff at UHRP formed the Uyghur Human Rights Project Workers Union (UHRPWU), affiliating with Teamsters Local 639. In the announcement of formation, the UHRPWU note that: "The current processes for addressing employee grievances, including fair wages and adequate benefits, a lack of transparency in decision-making, fear of retaliation, denial of opportunities, and sexual harassment complaints have fallen short and need meaningful improvement."

== Funding ==
According to Barry Sautman, the UAA founded the UHRP with grant funds provided by the NED, which contributed more than US$1.54 million from 2016 to 2020.

== Reports ==
The organization publishes reports and analysis in English and Chinese to defend Uyghurs' civil, political, social, cultural, and economic rights according to international human rights standards.

In July 2020, the UHRP published the report, "'The Happiest Muslims in the World': Disinformation, Propaganda, and the Uyghur Crisis," which analyzes the Chinese Communist Party's counter-narrative in response to escalating international alarm about human rights violations against Uyghurs.

In 2023, it published a report urging a halt of Western tourism to Xinjiang. It argued that Western tourism may risk "supporting the normalisation of Chinese government policies" that are aimed to erase the Uyghur identity.

UHRP has published reports on the CCP's policies regarding all aspects of Uyghur human rights, including cultural rights, such as "Kashgar Coerced: Forced Reconstruction, Exploitation, and Surveillance in the Cradle of Uyghur Culture," and "Extracting Cultural Resources: the Exploitation and Criminalization of Uyghur Cultural Heritage."

== See also ==
- East Turkestan independence movement
- World Uyghur Congress
- Uyghur American Association
- Persecution of Uyghurs in China
