= World Uyghur Congress =

Cultural and political organization

- Abbreviation: WUC
- Formation: 16 April 2004; 22 years ago
- Type: Non-profit NGO
- Purpose: "To promote democracy, human rights, and freedom for the Uyghur people"
- Headquarters: Munich, Germany
- Region served: Worldwide
- Official languages: Uyghur, Arabic, Chinese, English, French, German, Japanese, Russian, and Turkish
- President: Turghunjan Alawudun
- Key people: Dolkun Isa (former president); Rebiya Kadeer (former president); Erkin Alptekin (chief advisor)
- Affiliations: East Turkistan Education and Solidarity Association; Unrepresented Nations and Peoples Organization; Uyghur American Association; Uyghur Human Rights Project; World Uyghur Youth Congress
- Website: www.uyghurcongress.org

The World Uyghur Congress (WUC) (Note: Uyghur: دۇنيا ئۇيغۇر قۇرۇلتىيى, romanized: Dunya Uyghur Qurultiyi, Cyrillic script: Дуня Уйғур Қурултийи; simplified Chinese: 世界维吾尔代表大会; traditional Chinese: 世界維吾爾代表大會; pinyin: Shìjiè Wéiwú'ěr Dàibiǎo Dàhuì) is an international organization of exiled Uyghur groups that claims to "represent the collective interest of the Uyghur people" both inside and outside of the Xinjiang of the People's Republic of China. The World Uyghur Congress claims to be a nonviolent and peaceful movement that opposes what it considers to be the Chinese occupation of East Turkestan (Xinjiang) and advocates rejection of totalitarianism, religious intolerance and terrorism as an instrument of policy. It has been called the "largest representative body of Uyghurs around the world" and uses more moderate methods of human rights advocacy to influence the Chinese government within the international community in contrast to more radical Uyghur organizations.

The World Uyghur Congress has historically been funded in part by the National Endowment for Democracy or NED of the United States, though funding was frozen in 2025 after Elon Musk's Department of Government Efficiency cut funding to the NED. It has been designated as a terrorist organization by the government of the People's Republic of China since 2003.

The World Uyghur Congress was formed in mid-April 2004 at a meeting in Munich, Germany, as a collection of various exiled Uyghur groups, advocating for "greater autonomy," including the World Uyghur Youth Congress (WUYC) and some members of the East Turkestan National Congress (ETNC) following a split among the East Turkestan National Congress over the issue of autonomy vs independence. Until August 2024 Dolkun Isa, who has been living in Germany since 1996 after leaving China, was the president. His replacement as World Uyghur Congress president is Turgunjan Alawdun.

== Formation ==
Numerous Uyghur organizations representing the Uyghur movement in exile formed around the world from the 1980s to early 2000s but were disorganized and disunited. The World Uyghur Youth Congress was formed in November 1996. On 18 April 2004, the World Uyghur Youth Congress and another organization, the Eastern Turkistan National Congress, merged to form the World Uyghur Congress. Four months later, other Uyghur diaspora members founded the East Turkistan Government in Exile to advocate for more radical forms of ideological and armed struggle than those supported by the Uyghur World Congress. The East Turkistan Government in Exile claimed to be the "sole organ of the Eastern Turkestan Republic" just four months after the formation of the World Uyghur Congress, leading to immediate tensions between the two groups.

Erkin Alptekin served as the first president and Dolkun Isa as General Secretary since 2004 of the unified group; Alptekin served until 2006, when Rebiya Kadeer was elected as president at the second General Assembly meeting held on 24–27 November 2006. The Congress has convened seven assemblies since its inception—in 2004, 2006, 2009, 2012, 2016, 2017 and 2021. It is a member of the Unrepresented Nations and Peoples Organization, and is based primarily in Munich, home to a large Uyghur diaspora. There are no known links between the WUC and the East Turkestan Islamic Movement. In 2019, the World Uyghur Congress, represented by Dolkun Isa, received the Democracy Award for advocating for democracy, human rights, and freedom for the Uyghur people and the use of peaceful, nonviolent, and democratic means to help Uyghurs achieve self-determination.

According to a 2024 Chinese government report, the Uyghur World Congress received annual average funding from the National Endowment for Democracy of US$5-6 million.

== Objectives ==
The WUC has accused former Chinese Communist Party chairman Mao Zedong of colonizing Xinjiang and reneging on promises to allow self-determination for the region. According to the WUC, its main aim is to "promote the right of the Uyghur people to use peaceful, nonviolent, and democratic means to determine the political future of East Turkestan." It has declared its intention to work with world governments and form a "peaceful opposition" to the policies of the Chinese government in Xinjiang, whose treatment of Uyghurs, it alleges, risk turning the region into a "time bomb". The first president, Erkin Alptekin, described the Han Chinese as "colonists who want to replace us with their own people and assimilate those of us who remain, wiping out our culture." The Congress has also said China is exaggerating the threat from terrorists in order to justify repression in the region.

The Congress, like the Uyghur American Association based in Washington, D.C., use mass media and their own websites in an aim to inform the international community of human rights abuses in the Xinjiang Autonomous Region. It has been described as "cyber-separatism" which is supported in part by wealthy Uyghurs in the Middle East. Some newspapers in Kazakhstan and Kyrgyzstan reprint articles from the websites in Uyghur and Russian.

== Leadership ==
During the General Assembly held in Sarajevo from 24 to 27 October 2024, Turghunjan Alawudun was chosen to succeed Dolkun Isa as president. The Congress maintains representatives in Australia, Belgium, Denmark, France, Kyrgyzstan, Japan, Sweden and the United Kingdom. President Kadeer met United States President George W. Bush in June 2007, and British Foreign and Commonwealth Office officials in October the same year.

Its former president, Dolkun Isa was placed on the Red Notice List of the International Criminal Police Organization, though the German government did not recognize the notice, nor did the United States. Fair Trials, an organization working "for fair trials according to internationally recognized standards of justice" has noted that in practice, "INTERPOL's Red Notices are being used as political tools by NCBs, and are being issued and maintained on the basis of criminal cases which have been recognized as being politically-motivated by extradition courts and asylum authorities." The notice was removed in early 2018.

=== Former presidents ===
==== Dolkun Isa ====
Dolkun Isa (Uyghur: دولقۇن ئەيسا; born 2 September 1967) is a Uyghur activist based in Germany, who was the third President of the World Uyghur Congress (WUC) and now serves as the President of the Uyghur Center for Democracy and Human Rights (UZDM). He previously served as the General Secretary and Chairman of the Executive Committee of the WUC. He has presented Uyghur human rights issues to the UN Human Rights Council, European Parliament, European governments and international human rights organizations. The Chinese government has labelled him a terrorist for his advocacy since 2003.

==== Erkin Alptekin ====
Erkin Alptekin (Uyghur: ئەركىن ئالپتەكىن Еркин Алптекин; Chinese: 艾尔肯·阿布甫泰肯; born 4 July 1939) is a Uyghur activist from Germany. Alptekin is the son of Isa Alptekin, who was a prominent Uyghur politician in the Chinese Nationalist government. He has played very important roles for the foundation of some international organizations, the best known of which are the Unrepresented Nations and Peoples Organization (UNPO) and the World Uyghur Congress.

==== Rebiya Kadeer ====
Rebiya Kadeer (Uyghur: رابىيە قادىر, romanized: Rabiye Qadir; born 15 November 1946) is an ethnic Uyghur Chinese businesswoman and political activist. Born in Altay City, Xinjiang, China, Kadeer became a millionaire in the 1980s through her real estate holdings and ownership of a multinational conglomerate. Kadeer held various positions in the National People's Congress in Beijing and other political institutions before being arrested in 1999 for, according to Chinese state media, sending confidential internal reference reports to her husband, who worked in the United States as a pro-East Turkistan independence broadcaster. After she fled to the United States in 2005 on compassionate release, Kadeer assumed leadership positions in overseas Uyghur organizations such as the World Uyghur Congress.

== General Assemblies ==
=== 1st General Assembly ===
On 18 April 2004, the first General Assembly of World Uyghur Congress was hold in Munich, Germany. In the Assembly, the World Uyghur Youth Congress, which was formed in November 1996, and the East Turkestan National Congress declared their unification by forming the World Uyghur Congress. At this assembly, Erkin Alptekin was elected as the first president and Memet Tohti as the vice-president.

=== 2nd General Assembly ===
From 24 to 27 November 2008, the World Uyghur Congress has held its Second Assembly in Munich, Germany. WUC delegates from the United States, Canada, the Great Britain, Australia, Germany, Norway, the Netherlands, Sweden, Turkey, Kazakhstan and Kyrgyzstan attended this assembly. Uyghur political leader and human rights activist Ms. Rebiya Kadeer was unanimously elected as the new President of World Uyghur Congress. Ms. Kadeer's election has given new hope and strength for WUC and the Uyghur people all around the world.

=== 3rd General Assembly ===
From 21 to 25 May 2009, the World Uyghur Congress successfully held its Third General Assembly in Washington D.C. WUC delegates from the United States, Canada, the Great Britain, Australia, Germany, Norway, the Netherlands, Sweden, Turkey, Kazakhstan and Kyrgyzstan attended this assembly. Held in conjunction with the meeting was a conference on the Uyghur conflict entitled: East Turkestan: 60 Years under Communist Chinese Rule, that took place on 18 and 19 May, prior to the Assembly. During the week beginning on Monday, 18 May – officially designated by the WUC as "Uyghur Week" –WUC delegates, Uyghur human right activists, government officials, legislators and academics attended these two important events.

=== 4th General Assembly ===
From 14 to 17 May 2012, the World Uyghur Congress (WUC) successfully held its 4th General Assembly in Tokyo, Japan, attended by more than 120 Uyghur delegates from 20 countries around the world. During the four-day assembly, delegates in six commissions discussed new strategies for the peaceful promotion of human rights and democracy for the Uyghur people, in light of China's current political conditions and its upcoming change of political leadership later this year. They also held a peaceful protest in front of the Chinese Embassy in Tokyo with the participation of Japanese supporters. During the rally, a representative delivered a letter to the Chinese government calling for an end to ongoing grave human rights abuses suffered by Uyghurs in their homeland. Japanese and international media covered the protest. During the Assembly, Uyghur delegates also elected a new WUC leadership. A Uyghur democracy movement leader, Ms. Rebiya Kadeer, was reelected WUC President.

=== 5th General Assembly ===
On 13 July 2016, the World Uyghur Congress, under the cosponsorship of the Unrepresented Nations and Peoples Organization (UNPO) and the Uyghur Association of France (Association des Ouïghours de France) successfully completed its 5th General Assembly in Paris, France. The Assembly brought together over 140 WUC delegates from 18 countries to elect new representation, amend the charter of the organization and to discuss a forward-looking strategic advocacy plan over the next four years. The public opening session brought together members of the Uyghur community with representatives of civil society in France as well as WUC affiliate organizations from around the world to highlight the successes of those groups as well potential areas for improvement. Speeches during the ceremony were delivered by WUC President, Rebiya Kadeer and UNPO Secretary General, Marino Busdachin, along with leaders of WUC affiliate organizations.

=== 6th General Assembly ===
From 10 to 12 November 2017, the World Uyghur Congress successfully completed its 6th General Assembly on 12 November in Munich, Germany. The assembly brought together over 100 WUC delegates hailing from 18 countries from 10 to 12 November to amend the Charter of the organization, discuss the most effective direction of the organization in the coming years, to develop a working strategy to more effectively raise the Uyghur issue in international fora, and elect new leadership. Long-time Uyghur activist and co-founder of the WUC, Dolkun Isa, was elected as WUC President and former vice-president, Omer Kanat was elected as chairman of the executive committee. In addition, the delegates recognized the unparalleled contributions of former president and long time Uyghur activist Rebiya Kadeer with an honorary role with the organization. The closing ceremony was centered around a Uyghur cultural event that included a performance by members of the London Uyghur Ensemble, traditional dance and the recitation of poetry. The event allowed members of the Uyghur community from around the world to share in their common culture and heritage as the WUC looks to protect Uyghur identity going forward.

=== 7th General Assembly ===
From 11 to 14 November 2021, the World Uyghur Congress successfully completed its 7th General Assembly in Prague, Czechia.

== Activities ==
The WUC engages in a wide range of awareness raising and advocacy campaigns about the human rights situation for Uyghurs in China, concentrating on United States Congress in Washington, EU member states, and EU and UN human rights mechanisms. The WUC also works with European Parliament (including the EU Sub-committee on Human Rights), NGOs, UN Treaty Bodies, to which it submits alternative reports as well as UN Special Procedures (Special Rapporteurs, Independent Experts and Working Groups). The WUC also participates actively with the UN Human Rights Council and submits written statements and reports, delivers oral statements to plenary sessions, and organizes side events that focus on Chinese human rights abuses. The WUC also attends the UN Forum on Minority Issues.

=== One Voice One Step ===
On 15 March 2018, hundreds of Uyghurs demonstrated in cities around the world to draw attention to the Chinese government's repression of the Uyghur people in East Turkestan and urge the international community to take action. Demonstrations were held in 15 cities in 14 countries around the world, including: the US, Germany, Belgium, Norway, Turkey, Sweden, the UK, Netherlands, Australia, Canada, France, Finland and Japan.

On 18 October 2019, an exhibition named "A Prison Without Walls – East Turkestan Today", was opened, featuring photographs of reeducation camps, the everyday lives of Uighurs, and the July 2009 Urumqi riots opened at Taipei's 228 Memorial Museum. The exhibition was originally organized by the Uyghur American Association and the One Voice, One Step initiative and has been presented in 33 cities in 15 countries. The exhibition was to run for one month.

=== March in Brussels ===
On 27 April 2018, the Unrepresented Nations and Peoples Organization (UNPO) and its member organization, the World Uyghur Congress (WUC) held a protest march in Brussels, Belgium to demand that China release one million Uyghurs having been arbitrarily arrested and currently being detained within Chinese "reeducation camps." The participants also demanded that China stop the destruction of the Uyghur's cultural, religious and linguistic identity. This march brought together Uyghurs from many different diaspora groups from around the world and it is estimated that there were around 2,000 participants.

== Chinese government response ==
The government of the People's Republic of China has accused the World Uyghur Congress of fomenting unrest in Xinjiang, and added the WUC to its list of terrorist organizations in December 2003. It has labeled the WUC's president as a "terrorist" who "conspired with separatists and religious extremists to plan terror attacks." Kadeer rejected the accusations, saying that "anyone who is unhappy with China's harsh rule is a 'separatist'". During the July 2009 Ürümqi riots, the Chinese government said it had intercepted phone calls of overseas Turkestan groups and groups inside the country. The government has also alleged that Kadeer has close ties with the Dalai Lama, accused by China of inciting unrest in Tibet in 2008, and claimed that WUC president Kadeer said that "something similar should happen in Xinjiang."

== See also ==
- Persecution of Uyghurs in China
- East Turkestan independence movement
- East Turkistan Government-in-Exile
- East Turkistan National Awakening Movement
- Human rights in China
