= Uyghurlar =

1989 book by Turghun Almas

Uyghurlar (in English: The Uyghurs) is a book by historian Turghun Almas on the history of the "6,000 year history" of the Uyghur ethnic group of the Xinjiang region of China. It was published in the People's Republic of China in 1989, at a high point of liberalization of academic freedom and ethnic minority policy in China. It was one of the books of the period that presented an "alternative Uyghur history", based on Soviet historiography during the Sino-Soviet split, that advanced the thesis that the Uyghurs are the historical owner of Xinjiang and should have an independent state. It was also one of the first books to publicize the term East Turkestan, which suggests a kinship to a "West Turkestan" in the independent Central Asian states. In contrast to the official Chinese history of Xinjiang, which states that the region was an integral part of China since the Han dynasty, the book takes a nationalist view, saying that many "Uyghur" states throughout history were independent of or even dominant over, China.

Almas had used references from both Chinese and Soviet sources to prove various theories, including that the Tarim mummies indicate that the Uyghurs were "older than Chinese civilization itself", and that the Uyghurs invented the compass, gunpowder, papermaking, and printing. It concluded, "If the Jews could reclaim their homeland after 3,000 years, the Uyghurs should be able to reclaim their homeland after 3,000 to 6,000 years". In response to the book's growing popularity among Uyghurs, in February 1991, the Xinjiang CPC Propaganda Department and the Xinjiang Academy of Social Sciences jointly organized an academic conference to discuss the historical claims in Uyghurlar, as well as those in two of Almas' other books. More than 140 historians, ethnographers, archaeologists, and literature specialists from different ethnic groups in Xinjiang and Beijing scrutinized the research of the book, concluding that it "distorted and falsified history". The government soon publicized a pamphlet called "One Hundred Mistakes of Turghun Almas' Uyghurlar" to publicize the book's historical flaws, which had the opposite effect of increasing interest in the book. The book was banned and Almas was said to be placed under "virtual house arrest" in Urumqi.

== Translations ==
A Japanese version was published in December 2019 by Shukousha.
