= Uyghur Revolutionary Union of Altishahri and Jungharian Workers =

The Uyghur Revolutionary Union of Altishahri and Jungharian Workers, also known as the Uyghur Revsoyuz or Inqilawi Uyghur Itipaqi, was an organization of diaspora from China in Soviet Turkestan 1921–1922.

In early 1921 the Turkestan Bureau of the Communist International (Comintern) called for the holding of a Turkestan Congress of the Union of Chinese Workers. Through the holding of this congress the Comintern hoped to promote the formation of workers soviets among Chinese subjects in Soviet Turkestan, and thus create a counterweight to the aqsaqals appointed by Chinese Xinjiang Province authorities in the diaspora communities. The Comintern also tasked the congress to promote educational activity and increase inclusion of women in political activities.

A three-member convening committee, led by Nazariants (an Armenian communist, in-charge of Kashgaria in the Turkestan Bureau). The committee first met on March 1, 1921, and at this meeting it decided to disassociate itself from the Moscow-based Union of Chinese Workers. The third meeting of the committee decided to adopt the name 'Union of Kashgari and Jungharian Workers' as the name of the proposed organization. A Han Chinese member left the convening committee after its fourth meeting, and was replaced by the Kashgari Abdurahman Mahmudov. Further west, the Council for Propaganda and Action of the Peoples of the East had organized a branch of the Union of Kashgari-Chinese Workers in Bukhara, with members among Kashgari soldiers of the Red Army in Kerki. Whilst this group initially wanted to go its own way, it eventually joined the Tashkent congress initiative.

Initially the congress was planned for April 15, 1921, but was postponed to June 1, 1921. Eventually, on June 3, 1921, the First All-Turkestan Congress of the Union of Kashgari and Jungharian Workers was held in Tashkent. The founding of the organization coincided with the launch of the newspaper Kambaghallar awazi ('Voice of the Poor'). A total of 130 delegates had been selected to participate in the congress, but only 117 managed to arrive in Tashkent. Two women were present among the delegates. Among the attending delegates there were 83 Kashgaris, 13 Taranchis, 10 Dungans, 3 Han Chinese, 3 Tatars, 2 Kirghiz and 1 Turk (a former Ottoman officer and former prisoner of war). Of the delegates in attendance at the congress, 50 were Communist Party members. At the congress the Taranchi leader Abdullah Rozibaqiev, who was elected to the congress presidium, declared his Semirechye Uyghur Club merged into the Union of Kashgari and Jungharian Workers.

The Tashkent congress announced the establishment of the Uyghur Revolutionary Union of Altishahri and Jungharian Workers and nominated delegates to the 3rd World Congress of the Comintern. The delegates nominated to attend the Comintern congress were Ismail Tairov (Taranchi), Abdurahman Mahmudov and the Dungan Red Army officer Magaza Masanchi. The decision to add the word 'Uyghur' to the name of the organization was proposed by Rozibaqiev. Moreover, on Rozibaqiev's suggestion the term 'Kashgari' was replaced with 'Altishahri'. A Central Committee was elected, with Rozibaqiev as its secretary. Among the members were Osman Khoja (Jadidist from Bukhara), Galiev (Tatar) and Sabir Ahmed (the Turkish ex-POW), as well as an additional 4 Uyghurs, 2 Dungans, 1 Kirghiz and 1 Jew.

As of 1921, most of the Uyghur Revsoyuz membership was centered in Yettisu (2,500-3,000 members), but the organization also had branches in Ferghana, Andijan (220 members), Osh (35 members), Kokand (30 members), Margilan (65 members), Tashkent (265 members), Bukhara (40 members), Turkmenistan (Bayram Ali, Merv, Kerki, 200 members) and China (107 members). In Yettisu, the membership was predominately consisting of Russian-born Taranchis. The Yettisu branch chairman was Qadir Haji.

The Uyghur Revsoyuz is credited with having revived the 'Uyghur' ethnonym. However, the organization used the term to encompass multiple ethnic groups living in Xinyang.

The Central Committee of Uyghur Revsoyuz was disbanded in 1921 by decision of the Communist Party of Turkestan, as a number of Central Committee members (such as Khoja, Ahmed and other) had sided with Enver Pasha and joined the counter-revolutionary basmachi rebels. The sole branch of the Uyghur Revsoyuz that could continue to operate was the Yettisu branch. At a 1922 conference, the Yettisu branch decided to disband itself as well. At the conference Rozibaqiev argued in favour of liquidation, Qadir Haji being the sole opponent of the decision. The Plowers' Union, headed by Qadir Haji, was founded as a successor organization.
