= Abduxaliq Uyghur =

Uyghur poet

Abduhalik Uyghur
- ئابدۇخالىق ئۇيغۇر
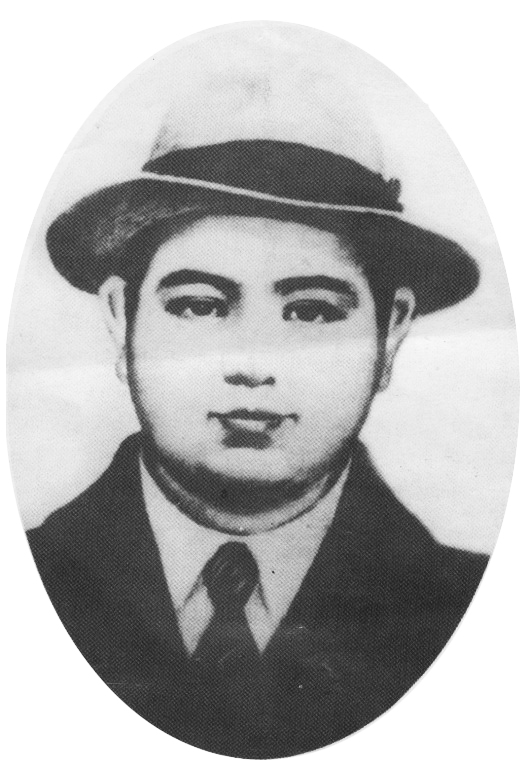
- Born: February 9, 1901; Turpan, Xinjiang, Qing Empire
- Died: March 13, 1933 (aged 32); Turpan, Xinjiang, China
- Writing career
- Language: Uyghur
- Genre: poetry
- Notable work: Oygan (Awake!)

Abduhalik Uyghur (Uyghur: ئابدۇخالىق ئۇيغۇر, Абдухалиқ Уйғур; 9 February 1901 – 13 March 1933, sometimes called Abduxaliq Uyghur) was a Uyghur poet who began his studies in a Madrasah at the age of 8.

He studied Arabic, Persian and Uyghur classics. Later on, he went to a Chinese school in Turpan, and after learning Chinese, studied various Chinese literary works, including those of Sun Yat Sen and Lu Xun.

After 1923, he spent 3 years in the Soviet Union, where he studied the works of Pushkin, Tolstoy, Gorky, and other figures important in Russian literature.

He wrote the famous nationalist poem Oyghan, which opened with the line "Ey pekir Uyghur, oyghan!" (Hey poor Uyghur, wake up!). He was later executed by the Chinese warlord Sheng Shicai in Turpan at the age of 32, on 13 March 1933, for inciting Uyghur nationalist sentiments through his works.

== Poems ==
- Oygan
- Gezep ve Zar
- Zulumga Karşi
- Körüngen Tag Yirak Emes
- Köñül Hahişi
