= Turghun Almas =

Uyghur historian (1924–2001)

- Born: 30 October 1924; Kashgar, Xinjiang
- Died: 11 September 2001 (aged 76); Ürümqi, Xinjiang
- Occupation(s): Historian, poet

Turghun Almas (Uyghur: تۇرغۇن ئالماس; Chinese: 吐尔贡·阿力玛斯; 30 October 1924 – 11 September 2001) was a Uyghur historian and poet born in Kashgar. He was criticized for his "support for ethnic nationalist separatists" by Wang Lequan. He was jailed from 1943 to 1946 and again from July 1947 to April 1949 for his political activities. In 1950 he became an editor for the Azadliq (Freedom) newspaper.

Turghun began researching Uyghur history in 1980. In 1989, the publication of his book Uyghurlar advanced the thesis that the Uyghurs are the historical owner of Xinjiang and should have an independent state. The book was banned after its publication, and Turghun was allegedly under house arrest until his death in Ürümqi.
