= Tarim Basin =

Endorheic basin in Xinjiang, China

Coordinates: 39°N 83°E

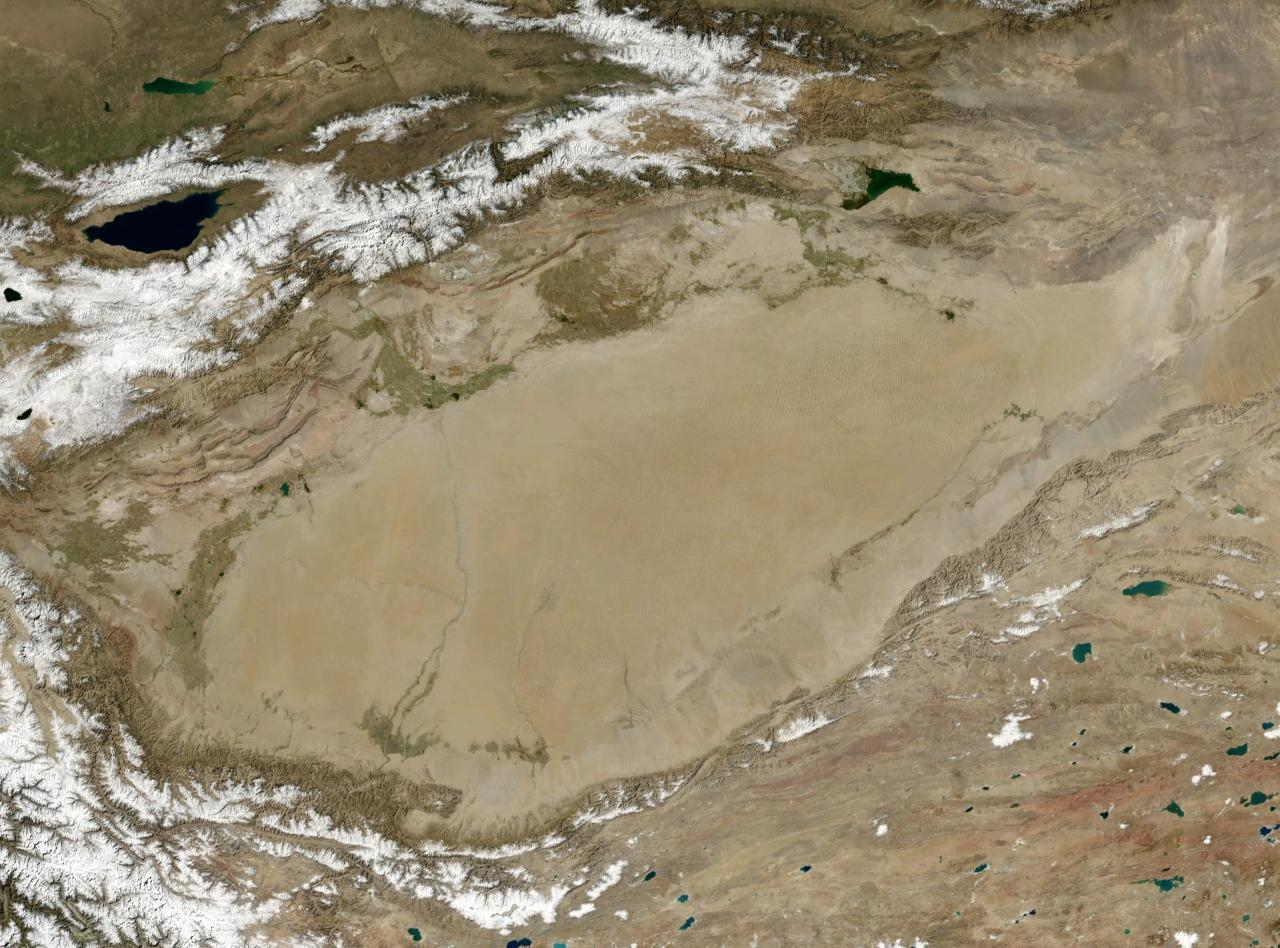

Chinese name
- Chinese: 塔里木盆地
Transcriptions
Standard Mandarin
- Hanyu Pinyin: Tǎlǐmù Péndì
- Wade–Giles: T'a^{3}-li^{3}-mu^{4} P'en^{2}-ti^{4}
- IPA: [tʰǎlìmû pʰə̌ntî]

Nanjiang
- Chinese: 南疆
- Literal meaning: Southern Xinjiang
Transcriptions
Standard Mandarin
- Hanyu Pinyin: Nánjiāng
- Wade–Giles: Nan^{2}-chiang^{1}
- IPA: [nǎntɕjáŋ]

Uyghur name
- Uyghur: تارىم ئويمانلىقى
Transcriptions
- Latin Yëziqi: Tarim Oymanliqi
- Yengi Yeziⱪ: Tarim Oymanliⱪi
- Siril Yëziqi: Тарим ойманлиқи

The Tarim Basin is an endorheic basin in Xinjiang, Northwestern China, occupying an area of about 888,000 km^{2} (343,000 sq mi) and the largest basin in Northwest China. Located in China's Xinjiang region, it is sometimes used synonymously to refer to the southern half of the province, that is, Southern Xinjiang or Nanjiang (Chinese: 南疆; pinyin: Nánjiāng), as opposed to the northern half of the province known as Dzungaria or Beijiang. Its northern boundary is the Tian Shan mountain range and its southern boundary is the Kunlun Mountains on the edge of the Tibetan Plateau. The Taklamakan Desert dominates much of the basin. The historical Uyghur name for the Tarim Basin is Altishahr (Traditional Uyghur: آلتی شهر, Chinese: 六城), which means 'six cities' in Uyghur. The region was also called Little Bukhara or Little Bukharia. The basin is a major area for renewable energy development, particularly solar and wind power, with a focus on utilizing the vast Taklamakan Desert. A high-voltage power loop has been constructed around the basin, collecting energy from various sources and transmitting it to other regions.

== Geography and relation to Xinjiang ==
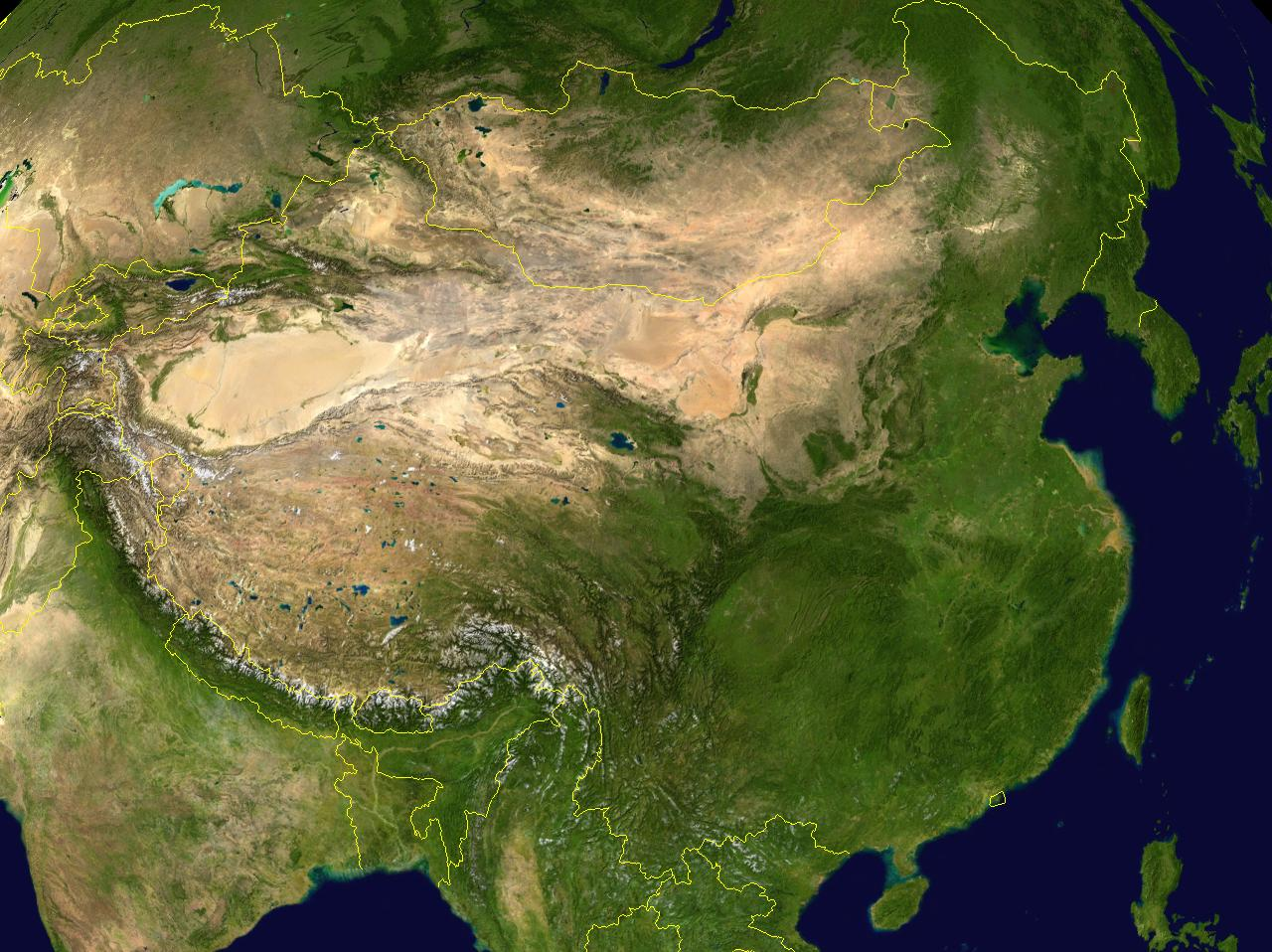
The Tarim Basin is a oval-shaped desert in Central Asia.

Xinjiang consists of two main geographically, historically, and ethnically distinct regions with different historical names, Dzungaria and the Tarim Basin (Altishahr), until it was merged into the Chinese Province of Xinjiang in 1884. At the time of the Qing conquest in 1759, Dzungaria was inhabited by steppe-dwelling, nomadic Mongolic Buddhist Dzungars, while the Tarim Basin (Altishahr) was inhabited by sedentary, oasis-dwelling, Turkic-speaking Uyghur Muslim peasants. Dzungaria and the Tarim Basin were each governed separately until the creation of Xinjiang province.

=== Tarim Basin locations ===
Places in and near the Tarim Basin. The highlighted area is roughly 1800 km across.

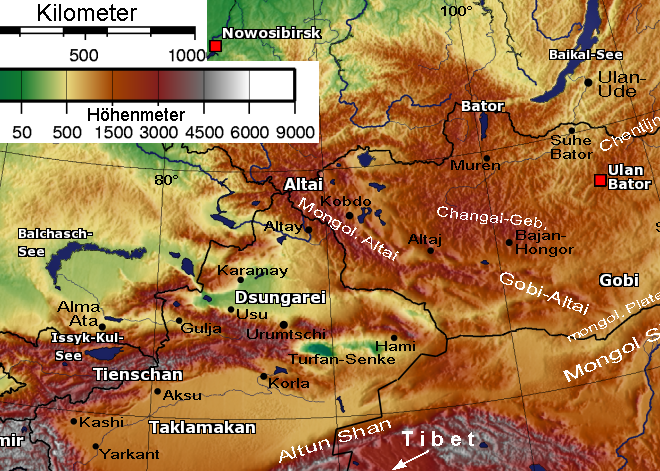
Physical map showing the separation of Dzungaria and the Tarim Basin (Taklamakan) by the Tien Shan Mountains

==== North side ====
The Chinese called this the Tien Shan Nan Lu or Tien Shan South Road, as opposed to the Bei Lu north of the mountains. Along it runs the modern highway and railroad while the middle Tarim River is about 100 km south. The caravans met in Kashgar before crossing the mountains. Bachu or Miralbachi; Uchturpan north of the main road; Aksu on the large Aksu River; Kucha was once an important kingdom; Luntai; Korla, now a large town; Karashar near Bosten Lake; Turpan north of the Turpan Depression and south of the Bogda Shan; Hami; then southeast to Anxi and the Gansu Corridor.

==== Center ====
Most of the basin is occupied by the Taklamakan Desert which is too dry for permanent habitation. The Yarkand, Kashgar and Aksu Rivers join to form the Tarim River which runs along the north side of the basin. Formerly it continued to Loulan, but some time after 330 AD it turned southeast near Korla toward Charkilik, and Loulan was abandoned. The Tarim ended at the now-dry Lop Nur, which occupied a shifting position east of Loulan. Eastward is the fabled Jade Gate which the Chinese considered the gateway to the Western Regions. Beyond that was Dunhuang with its ancient manuscripts and then Anxi at the west end of the Gansu Corridor.

==== South side ====
Settlements include Kashgar; Yangi Hissar, famous for its knives; Yarkand, once larger than Kashgar; Karghalik (Yecheng), with a route to India; Karakash; Khotan, the main source of Chinese jade; eastward the land becomes more desolate; Keriya (Yutian); Niya (Minfeng); Qiemo (Cherchen); Charkilik (Ruoqiang). The modern road continues east to Tibet. There is currently no road east across the Kumtag Desert to Dunhuang, but caravans somehow made the crossing through the Yangguan pass south of the Jade Gate.

=== Roads and transportation ===
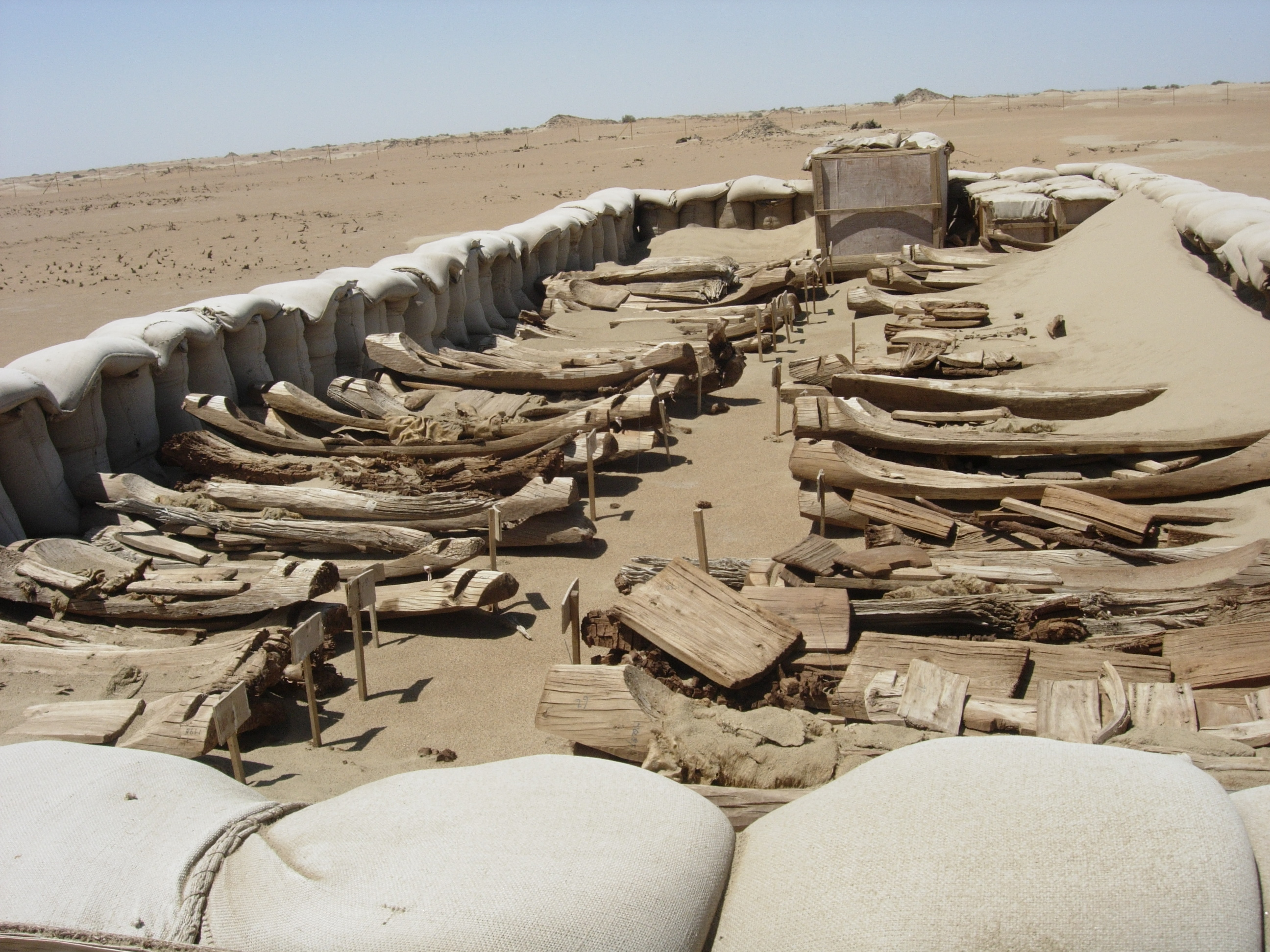
Tarim Basin, ancient boat-shaped coffins

==== Railways ====
The whole Tarim Basin and the Taklamakan Desert are surrounded by railroads. The Southern Xinjiang Railway branches from the Lanxin Railway near Turpan, follows the north side of the basin to Kashgar, and curves southeast to Khotan, while Hotan–Ruoqiang railway loops around the south and west side of the Traim. They are part of the Taklimakan Desert railway loop, joined together with sections of the Golmud–Korla railway, Hotan–Ruoqiang railway, Kashgar–Hotan railway, and Southern Xinjiang railway.

==== Roads ====
The main road from eastern China reaches Ürümqi and continues as highway 314 along the north side to Kashgar. Highway 315 follows the south side from Kashgar to Charkilik and continues east to Tibet. There are currently four north–south roads across the desert. 218 runs from Charkilik to Korla along the former course of the Tarim, forming an oval whose other end is Kashgar. The Tarim Desert Highway, a major engineering achievement, crosses the center from Niya to Luntai. The new Highway 217 follows the Khotan River from Khotan to near Aksu. A road follows the Yarkant River from Yarkand to Baqu. East of the Korla-Charkilik road, travel continues to be very difficult. Highway 580 is a relatively new highway, finished in 2022, that runs northeast to southwest, connecting Hotan Prefecture to Aksu Prefecture

==== Rivers ====
Rivers coming south from the Tien Shan join the Tarim, the largest being the Aksu. Rivers flowing north from the Kunlun are usually named for the town or oasis they pass through. Most dry up in the desert; only the Hotan River reaches the Tarim in good years. An exception is the Qiemo River which flows northeast into Lop Nur. Ruins in the desert imply that these rivers were once larger.

==== Caravans and passes ====
The original caravan route seems to have followed the south side. At the time of the Han dynasty conquest, it shifted to the center (Jade Gate-Loulan-Korla). When the Tarim changed course about 330 AD it shifted north to Hami. A minor route went north of the Tian Shan. When there was war on the Gansu Corridor trade entered the basin near Charkilik from the Qaidam Basin. The original route to India seems to have started near Yarkand and Kargilik, but it is now replaced by the Karakoram Highway south from Kashgar. To the west of Kashgar via the Irkeshtam border crossing is the Alay Valley, which was once the route to Persia. Northeast of Kashgar the Torugart pass leads to the Ferghana Valley. Near Uchturpan the Bedel Pass leads to Lake Issyk-Kul and the steppes. Somewhere near Aksu the difficult Muzart Pass led north to the Ili River basin (Kulja). Near Korla was the Iron Gate Pass and now the highway and railway north to Ürümqi. From Turfan the easy Dabancheng pass leads to Ürümqi. The route from Charkilik to the Qaidam Basin was of some importance when Tibet was an empire.

North of the mountains is Dzungaria with its central Gurbantünggüt Desert, Ürümqi, and the Karamay oil fields. The Kulja territory is the upper basin of the Ili River and opens out onto the Kazakh Steppe with several roads east. The Dzungarian Gate was once a migration route and is now a road and rail crossing. Tacheng or Tarbaghatay is a crossroads and former trading post.

== Geology ==
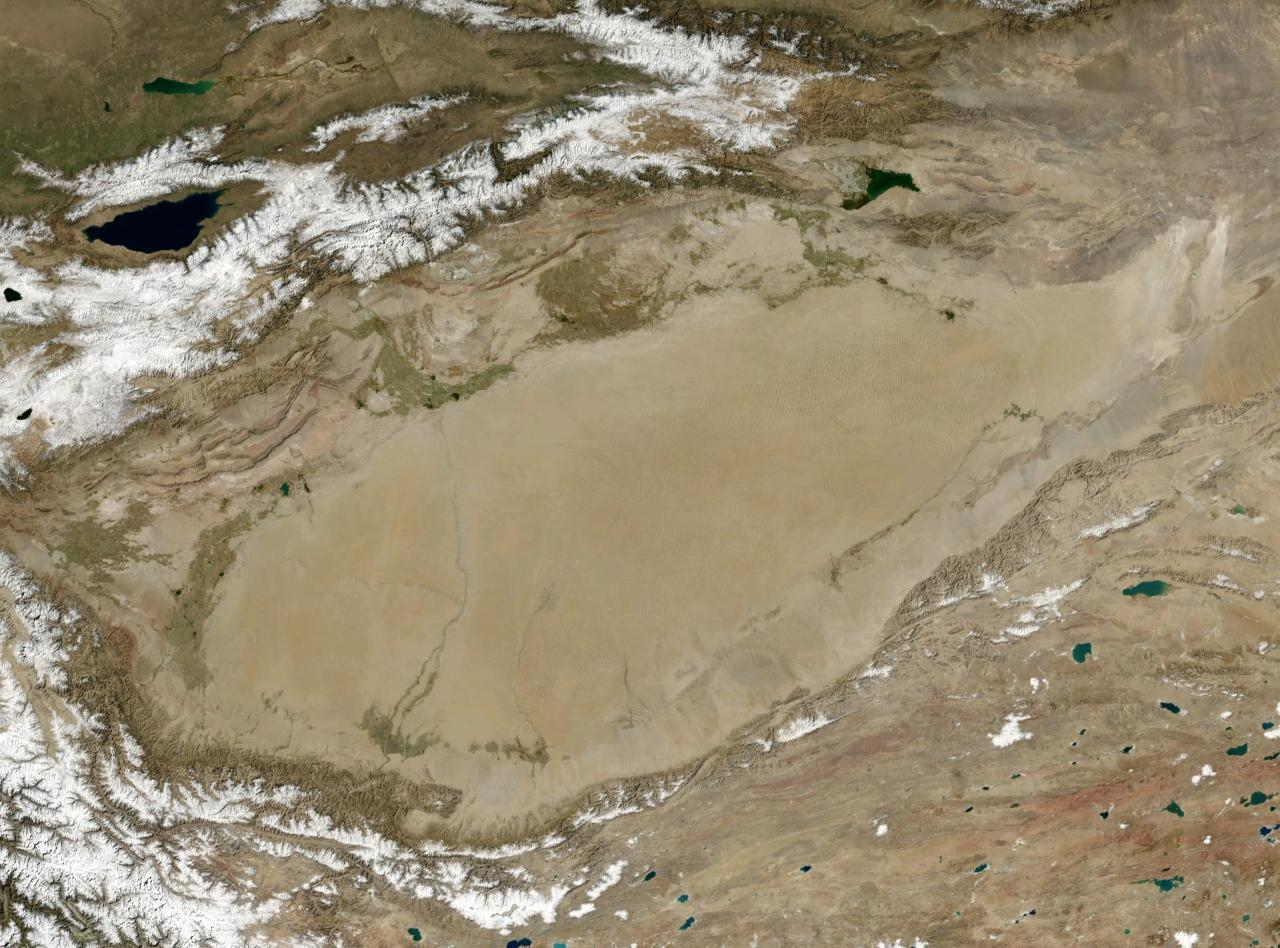
NASA landsat photo of the Tarim Basin

The Tarim Basin is the result of an amalgamation between an ancient microcontinent and the growing Eurasian continent during the Carboniferous to Permian periods, a process which ended in the earliest Triassic with the closure of the Palaeo-Asian Ocean. At present, deformation around the margins of the basin is resulting in the microcontinental crust being pushed under Tian Shan to the north, and Kunlun Shan to the south.

A thick succession of Paleozoic, Mesozoic and Cenozoic sedimentary rocks occupy the central parts of the basin, locally exceeding thicknesses of 15 km (9 mi). The source rocks of oil and gas tend to be mostly Permian mudstones and, less often, Ordovician strata which experienced an intense and widespread early Hercynian karstification. The effect of this event are e.g. paleokarst reservoirs in the Tahe oil field. Below the level enriched with gas and oil is a complex Precambrian basement believed to be made up of the remnants of the original Tarim microplate, which accrued to the growing Eurasian continent in Carboniferous time. The snow on the Karakoram mountain range flows into glaciers which move down the valleys to melt. The melted water forms rivers which flow down the mountains and into the Tarim Basin, never reaching the sea. Surrounded by desert, some rivers feed the oases where the water is used for irrigation while others flow to salt lakes and marshes.

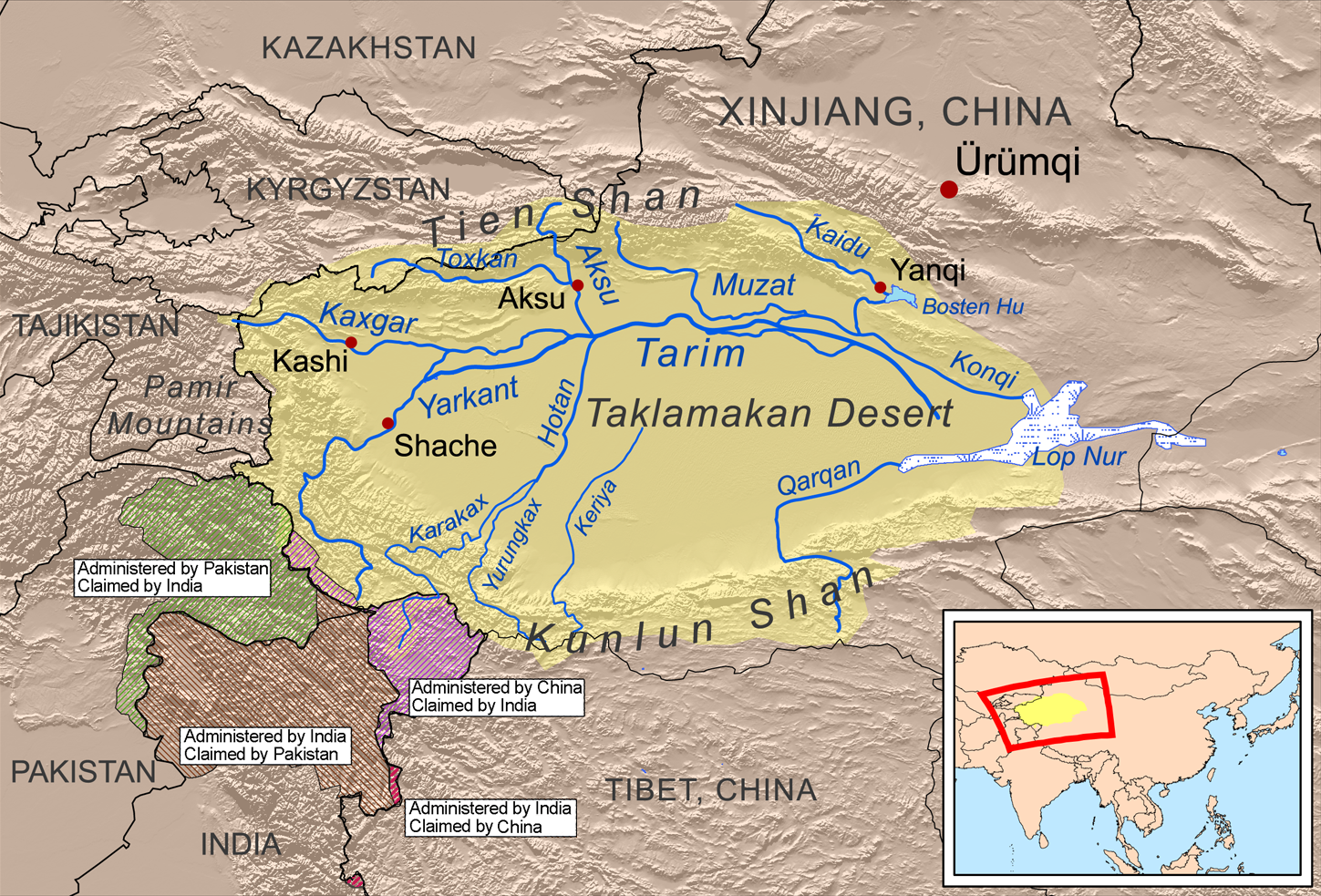
The Tarim Basin, 2008

Lop Nur is a marshy, saline depression at the east end of the Tarim Basin. The Tarim River ends in Lop Nur.

The Tarim Basin is believed to contain large reserves of petroleum and natural gas. Methane comprises over 70 percent of the natural gas reserve, with variable contents of ethane (<1% – c. 18%) and propane (<0.5% – c. 9%). China National Petroleum Corporation's comprehensive exploration of the Tarim basin between 1989 and 1995 led to the identification of 26 oil- and gas-bearing structures. These occur at greater depths and in scattered deposits. Beijing aims to develop Xinjiang into China's new energy base for the long run, supplying one-fifth of the country's total oil supply by 2010, with an annual output of 35 million tonnes. On June 10, 2010, Baker Hughes announced an agreement to work with PetroChina Tarim Oilfield Co. to supply oilfield services, including both directional and vertical drilling systems, formation evaluation services, completion systems and artificial lift technology for wells drilled into foothills formations greater than 7,500 meters (24,600 feet) deep with pressures greater than 20,000 psi (1,400 bar) and bottom-hole temperatures of approximately 160 °C (320 °F). Electrical submersible pumping (ESP) systems will be employed to dewater gas and condensate wells. PetroChina will fund any joint development.

In 2015, Chinese researchers published the finding of a vast, carbon-rich underground sea beneath the basin.

== History ==
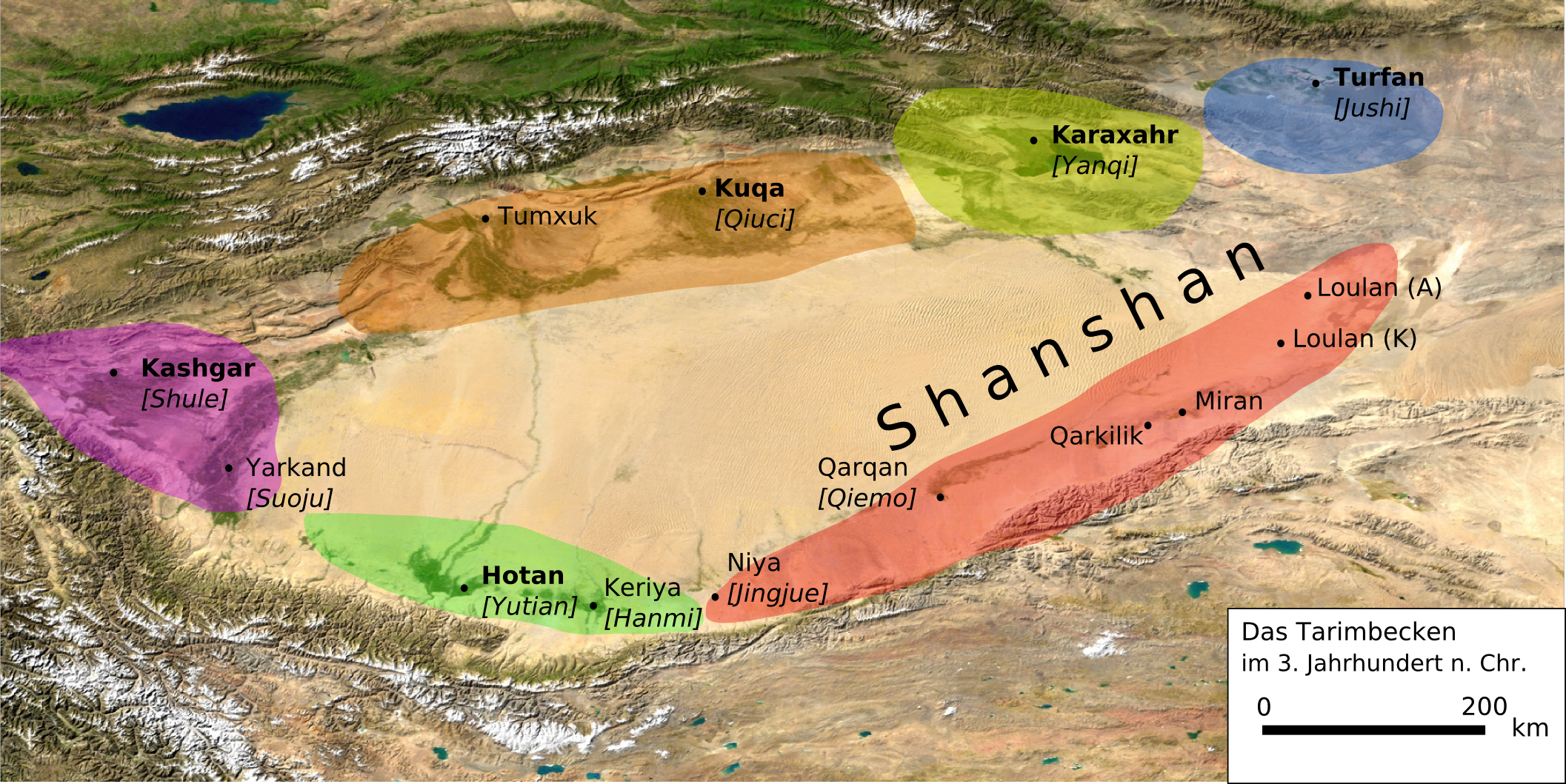
Tarim Basin in the 3rd century

It is speculated that the Tarim Basin may be one of the last places in Asia to have become inhabited: It is surrounded by mountains and irrigation technologies might have been necessary.

The Northern Silk Road on one route bypassed the Tarim Basin north of the Tian Shan mountains and traversed it on three oases-dependent routes: one north of the Taklamakan Desert, one south, and a middle one connecting both through the Lop Nur region.

- The northern Tarim route ran from Kashgar via Aksu, Kucha, Korla, through the Iron Gate Pass, then Karasahr, Jiaohe, Turpan, Gaochang and Kumul to Anxi.
- The southern Tarim route ran from Kashgar through Yarkant, Karghalik, Pishan, Khotan, Keriya, Niya, Qarqan, Qarkilik, Miran and Dunhuang to Anxi.
- The middle Tarim route, the shortest of the four, connected Korla on the northern Tarim route through Loulan and across the Lop Nur region and Dunhuang on the southern Tarim route. The Lop Nur region became uninhabitable in the 4th century and the middle route has been deserted since the 6th century.

=== Early periods ===
In the early period, beginning around 2000 BC, there were six different cultural zones in the Tarim Basin, and bronze began to appear. One of these cultures was the Xintala culture (c. 1700–1500 BC), near the site of Yanqi, also known as Karashar, to the north and east of the Tarim, at the Kaidu river. Structures made of mud bricks were found at Xintala, showing building techniques similar to those seen in early oasis sites in western Central Asia, as well as in Yanbulake. There were no burials in Xintala culture, and its settlements were small.

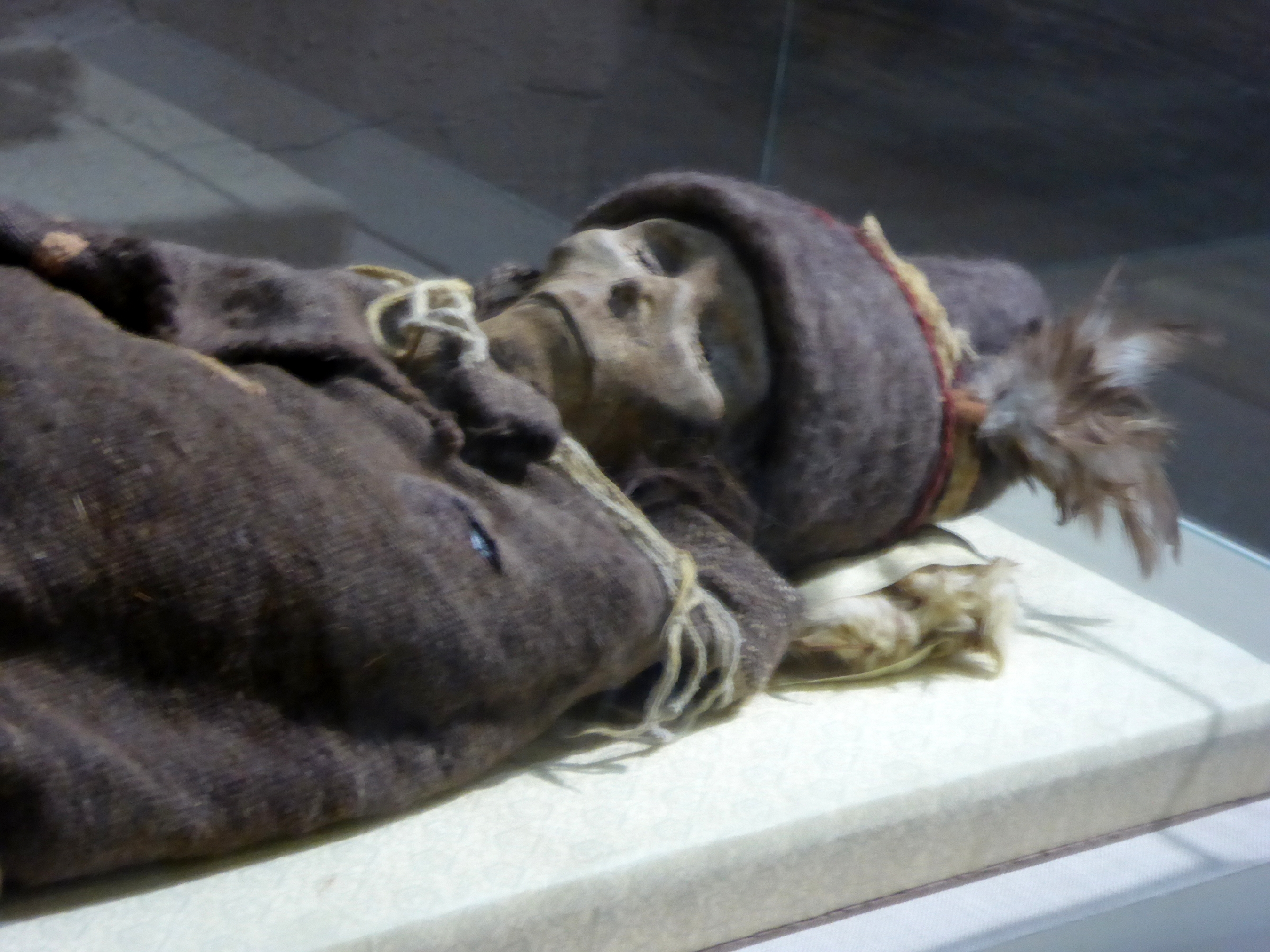
Tarim mummies, found in westernmost Xinjiang, in the Tarim Basin.

Autosomal genetic evidence suggests that the earliest Tarim people arose from locals of primarily Ancient North Eurasian descent with significant Northeast Asian admixture. The Tarim mummies have been found in various locations in the eastern Tarim Basin such as Loulan, the Xiaohe Tomb complex, and Qäwrighul. These mummies have previously been suggested to be of Tocharian origin, but recent evidence suggests that the mummies belonged to a distinct population unrelated to later Indo-European pastoralists, such as Afanasievo. Zhang et al. (2025) investigated a Late Bronze Age site in the far west of the Tarim Basin, dated 1600 to 1400 BC. Its inhabitants overwhelmingly descended from the Sintashta and Andronovo population, with additional ancestry from BMAC (10%) and Tarim_EMBA (12%). Nearly all subjects belonged to Y-DNA haplogroup R-M17.

In the Iron Age, the Chawuhu culture (c. 1000–400 BC) flourished in the Yanqi (Karashar) oasis, and also reached the Alagou sites near the Turfan basin, and north to the region close to Ürümqi.

Earlier diggings in the southern Tarim Basin, in the 1990s, suggested that Yuansha (Djoumbulak Koum) in the Keriya river valley was the earliest fortified urban site, from around 400 BC, but new surveys and excavations between 2018 and 2020, showed that the site Kuiyukexiehai'er (Koyuk Shahri), located in the northern Tarim Basin, is actually the earliest fortified urban settlement in the entire region, covering 6 hectares, and developed in four phases between c. 770 BC and 80 AD. Spouted jars were found at this site, similar to those of Chawuhu culture, and buckles and moulds with animal motifs resemble steppe traditions.

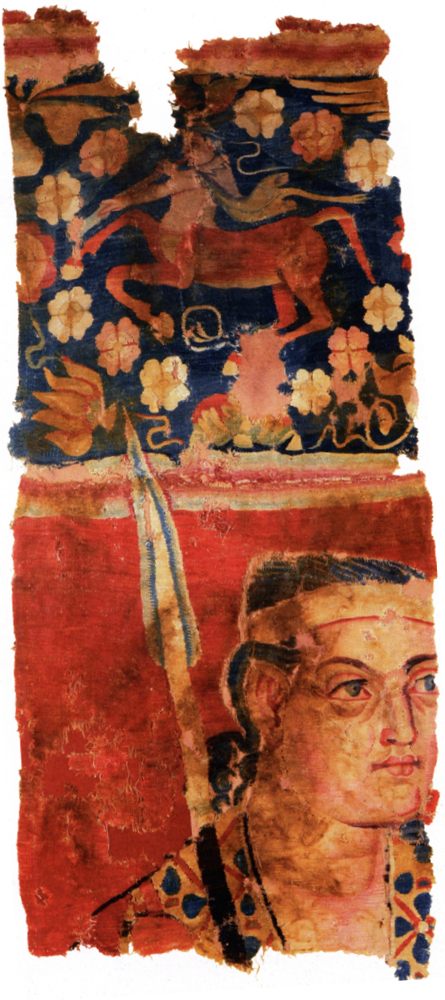
The Sampul tapestry, a woolen wall hanging from Lop County, Hotan Prefecture, Xinjiang, China, showing a possibly Greek soldier from the Greco-Bactrian kingdom (250–125 BC), with blue eyes, wielding a spear, and wearing what appears to be a diadem headband; depicted above him is a centaur, from Greek mythology, a common motif in Hellenistic art

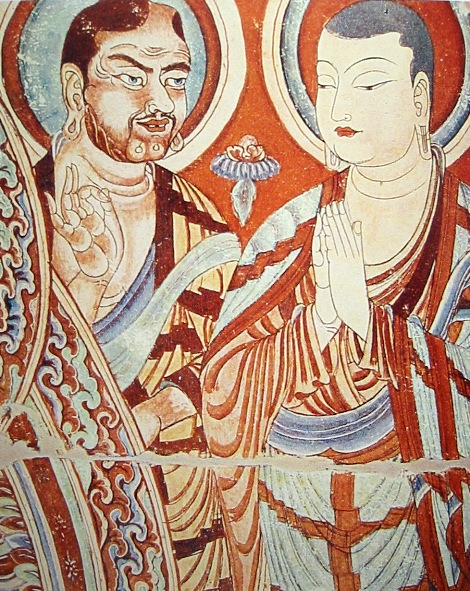
Two Buddhist monks on a mural of the Bezeklik Thousand Buddha Caves near Turpan, Xinjiang, China, 9th century AD; although Albert von Le Coq (1913) assumed the blue-eyed, red-haired monk was a Tocharian, modern scholarship has identified similar Caucasian figures of the same cave temple (No. 9) as ethnic Sogdians, an Eastern Iranian people who inhabited Turfan as an ethnic minority community during the phases of Tang Chinese (7th–8th century) and Uyghur rule (9th–13th century).

Another people in the region besides these Tarim people were the Indo-Iranian Saka people, who spoke various Eastern Iranian Khotanese Scythian or Saka dialects. In the Achaemenid era Old Persian inscriptions found at Persepolis, dated to the reign of Darius I (r. 522–486 BC), the Saka are said to have lived just beyond the borders of Sogdiana. Likewise, an inscription dated to the reign of Xerxes I (r. 486–465 BC) has them coupled with the Dahae people of Central Asia. The contemporary Greek historian Herodotus noted that the Achaemenid Persians called all Indo-Iranian Scythian peoples "Saka". They were known as the Sai (塞, sāi, sək in archaic Chinese) in ancient Chinese records. These records indicate that they originally inhabited the Ili and Chu River valleys of modern Kazakhstan. In the Chinese Book of Han, the area was called the "land of the Sai", i.e. the Saka. A people believed to be Saka has also been found in various locations in the Tarim Basin, for example in the Keriya region at Yumulak Kum (Djoumboulak Koum, Yuansha) around 200 km east of Khotan, with a tomb dated to as early as the 7th century BC.

According to the Sima Qian's Shiji, the nomadic Indo-European Yuezhi originally lived between Tengri Tagh (Tian Shan) and Dunhuang in Gansu, China. However, the Yuezhi were assaulted and forced to flee from the Hexi Corridor of Gansu by the forces of the Xiongnu ruler Modu Chanyu, who conquered the area in 177–176 BC (decades before the Han Chinese conquest and colonization of western tip of Gansu or the establishment of the Protectorate of the Western Regions). In turn the Yuezi attacked and pushing the Sai (i.e. Saka) west into Sogdiana, where in the mid-2nd century BC the latter crossed the Syr Darya into Bactria, but also into the Fergana Valley where they settled in Dayuan, south towards northern India, and eastward as well, where they settled in some of the oasis city-states of the Tarim Basin. Whereas the Yuezhi continued westward and conquered Daxia around 177–176 BC, the Sai (i.e. Saka), including some allied Tocharian peoples, fled south to the Pamirs before heading back east to settle in Tarim Basin sites like Yanqi (焉耆, Karasahr) and Qiuci (龜茲, Kucha). The Saka are recorded as inhabiting Khotan by at least the 3rd century and also settled in nearby Shache (莎車), a town named after its Saka inhabitants (i.e. saγlâ). Although the ancient Chinese called Khotan Yutian (于闐), its more native Iranian names during the Han period were Jusadanna (瞿薩旦那), derived from Indo-Iranian Gostan and Gostana, the names of the town and region around it, respectively.

=== Han dynasty ===
Around 200 BCE, the Yuezhi were overrun by the Xiongnu. The Xiongnu then tried to invade the western region of China, but ultimately failed and lost control of the region to the Chinese. The Han Chinese wrested control of the Tarim Basin from the Xiongnu at the end of the 1st century under the leadership of General Ban Chao (32–102 CE), during the Han-Xiongnu War. The Chinese administered the Tarim Basin as the Protectorate of the Western Regions. The Tarim Basin was later under many foreign rulers, but ruled primarily by Turkic, Han, Tibetan, and Mongolic peoples.

The powerful Kushans, who conquered the last vestiges of the Indo-Greek Kingdom, expanded back into the Tarim Basin in the 1st–2nd centuries CE, where they established a kingdom in Kashgar and competed for control of the area with nomads and Chinese forces. The Yuezhi or Rouzhi (Chinese: 月氏; pinyin: Yuèzhī; Wade–Giles: Yüeh^{⁴}-chih^{¹}, [ɥê ʈʂɻ̩́]) were an ancient people first reported in Chinese histories as nomadic pastoralists living in an arid grassland area in the western part of the modern Chinese province of Gansu during the 1st millennium BC. After a major defeat by the Xiongnu, in the 2nd century BC, the Yuezhi split into two groups: the Greater Yuezhi (Dà Yuèzhī 大月氏) and Lesser Yuezhi (Xiǎo Yuèzhī 小月氏). They introduced the Brahmi script, the Indian Prakrit language for administration, and Buddhism, playing a central role in the Silk Road transmission of Buddhism to Eastern Asia.

Three pre-Han texts mention peoples who appear to be the Yuezhi, albeit under slightly different names.

- The philosophical tract Guanzi (73, 78, 80 and 81) mentions nomadic pastoralists known as the Yúzhī 禺氏 (Old Chinese: *ŋʷjo-kje) or Niúzhī 牛氏 (OC: *ŋʷjə-kje), who supplied jade to the Chinese. (The Guanzi is now generally believed to have been compiled around 26 BC, based on older texts, including some from the Qi state era of the 11th to 3rd centuries BC. Most scholars no longer attribute its primary authorship to Guan Zhong, a Qi official in the 7th century BC.) The export of jade from the Tarim Basin, since at least the late 2nd millennium BC, is well-documented archaeologically. For example, hundreds of jade pieces found in the Tomb of Fu Hao (c. 1200 BC) originated from the Khotan area, on the southern rim of the Tarim Basin. According to the Guanzi, the Yúzhī/Niúzhī, unlike the neighbouring Xiongnu, did not engage in conflict with nearby Chinese states.
- The Tale of King Mu, Son of Heaven (early 4th century BC) also mentions the Yúzhī 禺知 (OC: *ŋʷjo-kje).
- The Yi Zhou Shu (probably dating from the 4th to 1st century BC) makes separate references to the Yúzhī 禺氏 (OC: *ŋʷjo-kje) and Yuèdī 月氐 (OC: *ŋʷjat-tij). The latter may be a misspelling of the name Yuèzhī 月氏 (OC: *ŋʷjat-kje) found in later texts, composed of characters meaning "moon" and "clan" respectively.

=== Sui–Tang dynasties ===
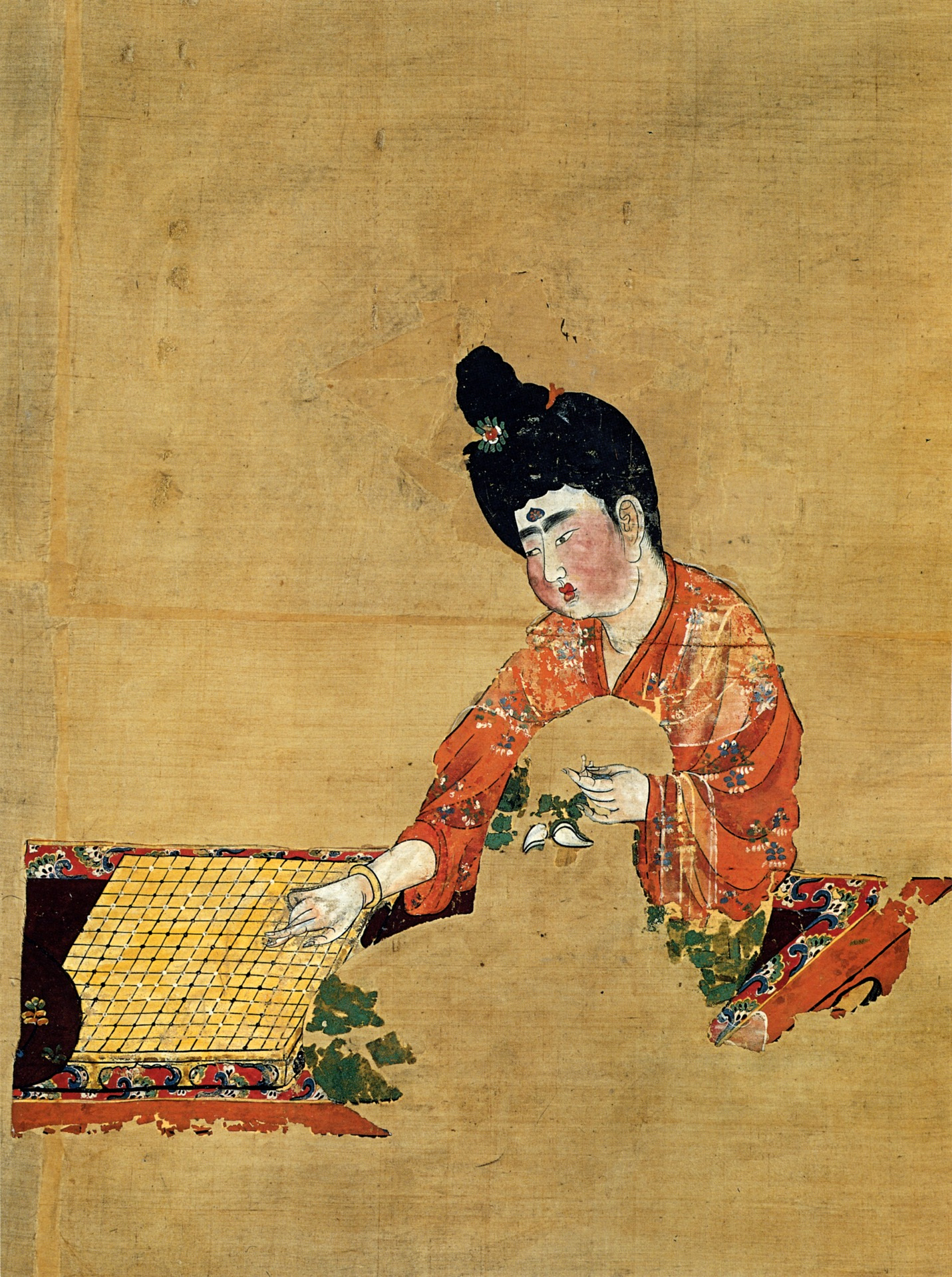
Fragmentary painting on silk of a woman playing the Go boardgame, from the Astana Cemetery, Gaochang, c. 744 AD, during the late period of Tang Chinese rule (just before the An Lushan Rebellion)

After the Han dynasty, the kingdoms of the Tarim Basin began to have strong cultural influences on China as a conduit between the cultures of India and Central Asia and China. Indian Buddhists had previously travelled to China during the Han dynasty, but the Buddhist monk Kumārajīva from Kucha, who visited China during the Six Dynasties period was particularly renowned. Music and dances from Kucha were also popular in the Sui and Tang periods.

During the Tang dynasty, a series of military expeditions were conducted against the oasis states of the Tarim Basin, then vassals of the Western Turkic Khaganate. The campaigns against the oasis states began under Emperor Taizong with the annexation of Gaochang in 640. The nearby kingdom of Karasahr was captured by the Tang in 644 and the kingdom of Kucha was conquered in 649.

Map of Taizong's campaigns against the Tarim Basin oasis states, allies of the Western Turks.

The expansion into Central Asia continued under Taizong's successor, Emperor Gaozong, who dispatched an army in 657 led by Su Dingfang against the Western Turk qaghan Ashina Helu. Ashina was defeated and the khaganate was absorbed into the Tang empire. The Tarim Basin was administered through the Anxi Protectorate and the Four Garrisons of Anxi. Tang hegemony beyond the Pamir Mountains in modern Tajikistan and Afghanistan ended with revolts by the Turks, but the Tang retained a military presence in Xinjiang. These holdings were later invaded by the Tibetan Empire to the south in 670. For the remainder of the Tang dynasty, the Tarim Basin alternated between Tang and Tibetan rule as they competed for control of Central Asia.

=== Kingdom of Khotan ===
As a consequence of the Han–Xiongnu War from 133 BC to 89 AD, the Tarim Basin region of Xinjiang in Northwest China, including the Saka-founded oasis city-state of Khotan and Kashgar, fell under Han Chinese influence, beginning with the reign of Emperor Wu (r. 141–87 BC) of the Han dynasty. Much like the neighboring people of the Kingdom of Khotan, people of Kashgar, the capital of the Shule Kingdom, spoke Saka, one of the Eastern Iranian languages. As noted by the Greek historian Herodotus, the contemporary Persians labelled all Scythians "Saka". Indeed, modern scholarly consensus is that the Saka language, ancestor to the Pamir languages in northern India and Khotanese in Xinjiang, belongs to the Scythian languages.

During China's Tang dynasty (618–907 AD), the region once again came under Chinese suzerainty with the campaigns of conquest by Emperor Taizong of Tang (r. 626–649). From the late 8th to 9th centuries, the region changed hands between the Chinese Tang Empire and the rival Tibetan Empire. By the early 11th century the region had fallen to the Muslim Turkic peoples of the Kara-Khanid Khanate, which led to both the Turkification of the region and its conversion from Buddhism to Islam.

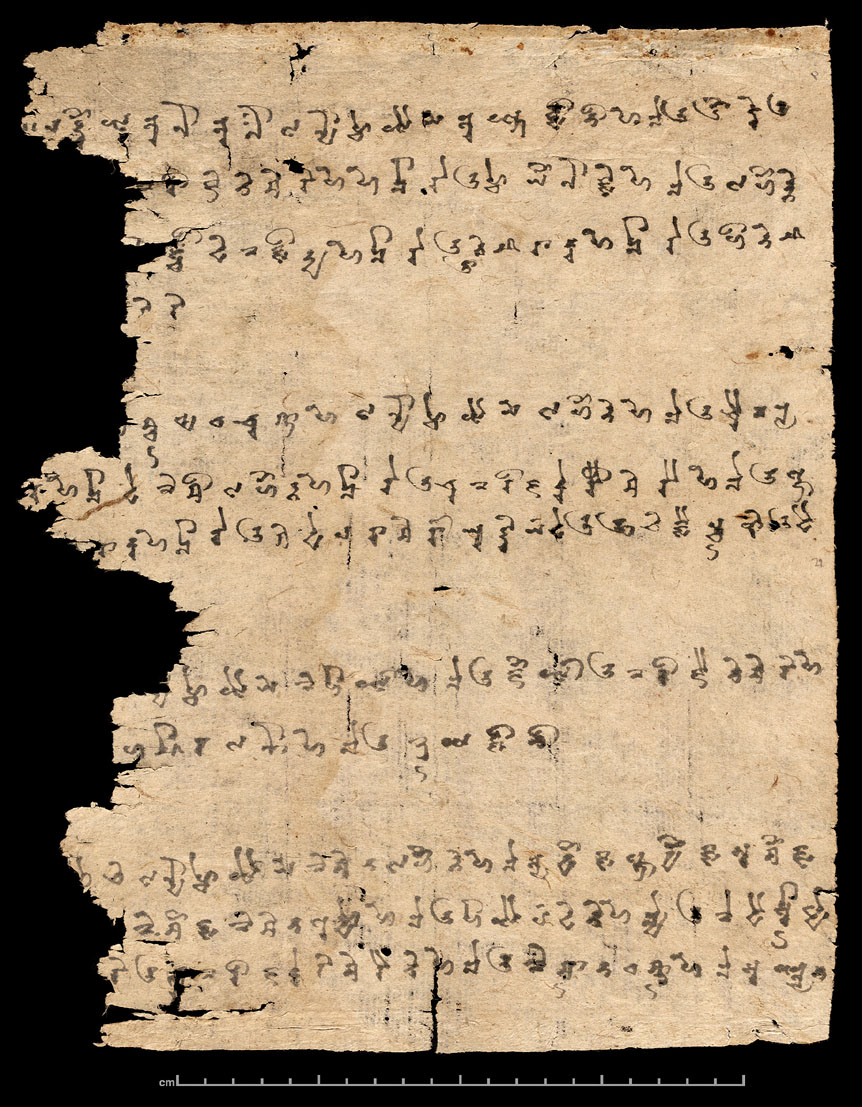
A document from Khotan written in Khotanese Saka, part of the Eastern Iranian branch of the Indo-European languages, listing the animals of the Chinese zodiac in the cycle of predictions for people born in that year; ink on paper, early 9th century

Suggestive evidence of Khotan's early link to India are minted coins from Khotan dated to the 3rd century, bearing dual inscriptions in Chinese and Gandhari Prakrit in the Kharosthi script. Although Prakrit was the administrative language of nearby Shanshan, 3rd-century documents from that kingdom record the title hinajha (i.e. "generalissimo") for the king of Khotan, Vij'ida-simha, a distinctively Iranian-based word equivalent to the Sanskrit title senapati, yet nearly identical to the Khotanese Saka hīnāysa attested in contemporary documents. This, along with the fact that the king's recorded regnal periods were given in Khotanese as kṣuṇa, "implies an established connection between the Iranian inhabitants and the royal power", according to the late Professor of Iranian Studies Ronald E. Emmerick (d. 2001). He contended that Khotanese-Saka-language royal rescripts of Khotan dated to the 10th century "makes it likely that the ruler of Khotan was a speaker of Iranian." Furthermore, he elaborated on the early name of Khotan:

The name of Khotan is attested in a number of spellings, of which the oldest form is hvatana, in texts of approximately the 7th to the 10th century AD, written in an Iranian language itself called hvatana by the writers. The same name is attested also in two closely related Iranian dialects, Sogdian and Tumshuq...Attempts have accordingly been made to explain it as Iranian, and this is of some importance historically. My own preference is for an explanation connecting it semantically with the name Saka, for the Iranian inhabitants of Khotan...

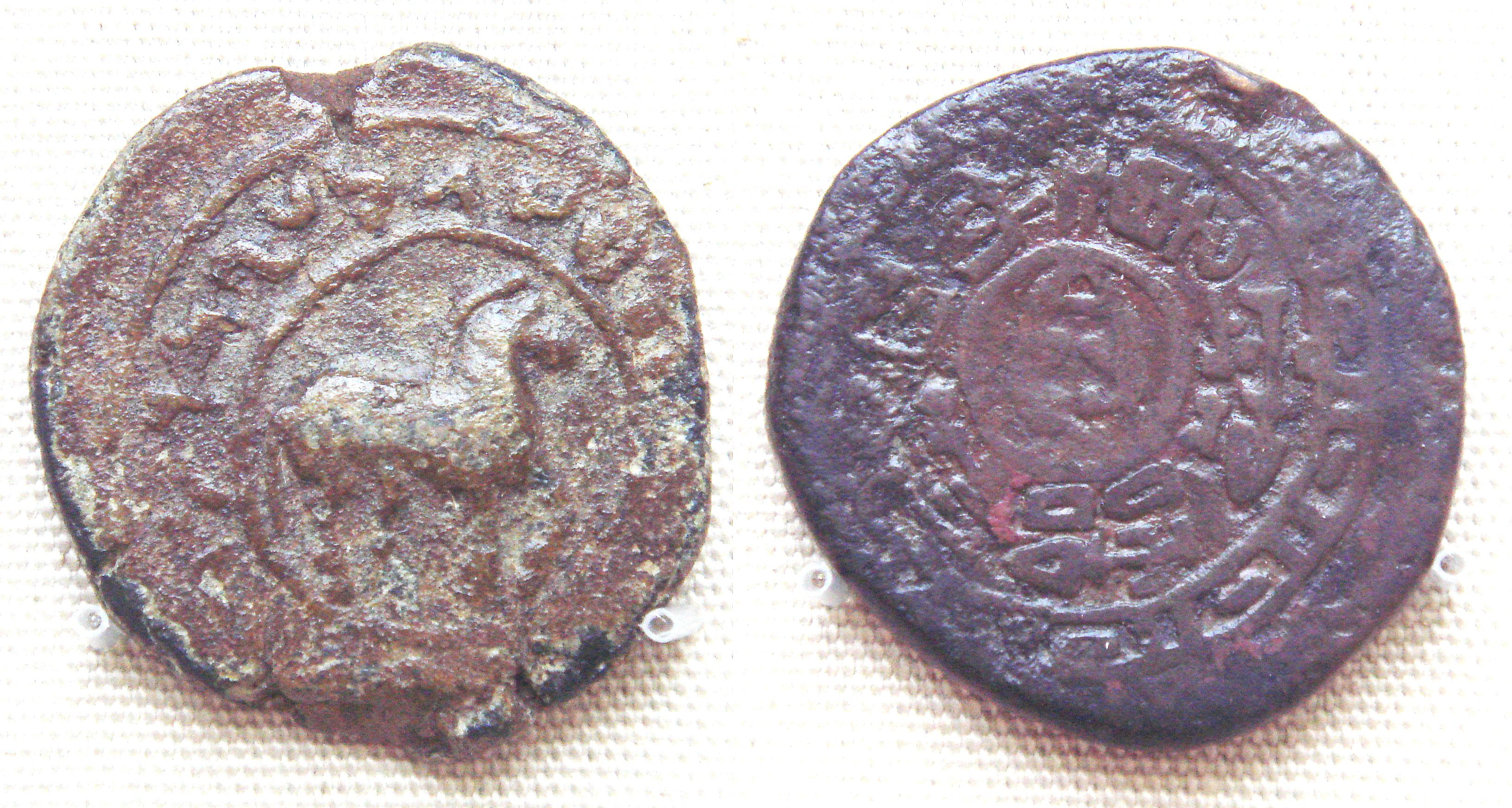
Coin of Gurgamoya, king of Khotan. Khotan, 1st century CE. Obv: Kharosthi legend, "Of the great king of kings, king of Khotan, Gurgamoya. Rev: Chinese legend: "Twenty-four grain copper coin". British Museum

In Northwest China, Khotanese-Saka-language documents, ranging from medical texts to Buddhist literature, have been found, primarily in Khotan and Tumshuq (northeast of Kashgar). They largely predate the arrival of Islam to the region under the Turkic Kara-Khanids. Similar documents in the Khotanese-Saka language were found in Dunhuang dating mostly to the 10th century.

=== Turkic influx ===
After the collapse of the Uyghur Khaganate of modern-day Mongolia, Uyghur people migrated to the Tarim Basin and mixed with the Tocharians and converted to their religion, and adopted their method of oasis agriculture. In the tenth century, the Karluks, Yagmas, Chigils and other Turkic tribes founded the Kara-Khanid Khanate in Semirechye, Western Tian Shan, and Kashgaria.

=== Islamisation of the Tarim Basin ===
The Karakhanids became the first Islamic Turkic dynasty in the tenth century when Sultan Satuq Bughra Khan converted to Islam in 966 while he controlled Kashgar. Satuq Bughra Khan and his son directed endeavors to preach Islam among the Turks and engage in conquests. Satok Bughra Khan's nephew or grandson Ali Arslan was slain by the Buddhists during the war. Buddhism lost territory to the Turkic Karakhanid Satok Bughra Khan during the Karakhanid reign around Kashgar. The Tarim Basin became Islamicized over the next few centuries.

==== Turkic-Islamic Kara-Khanid conquest of Iranic Saka Buddhist Khotan ====
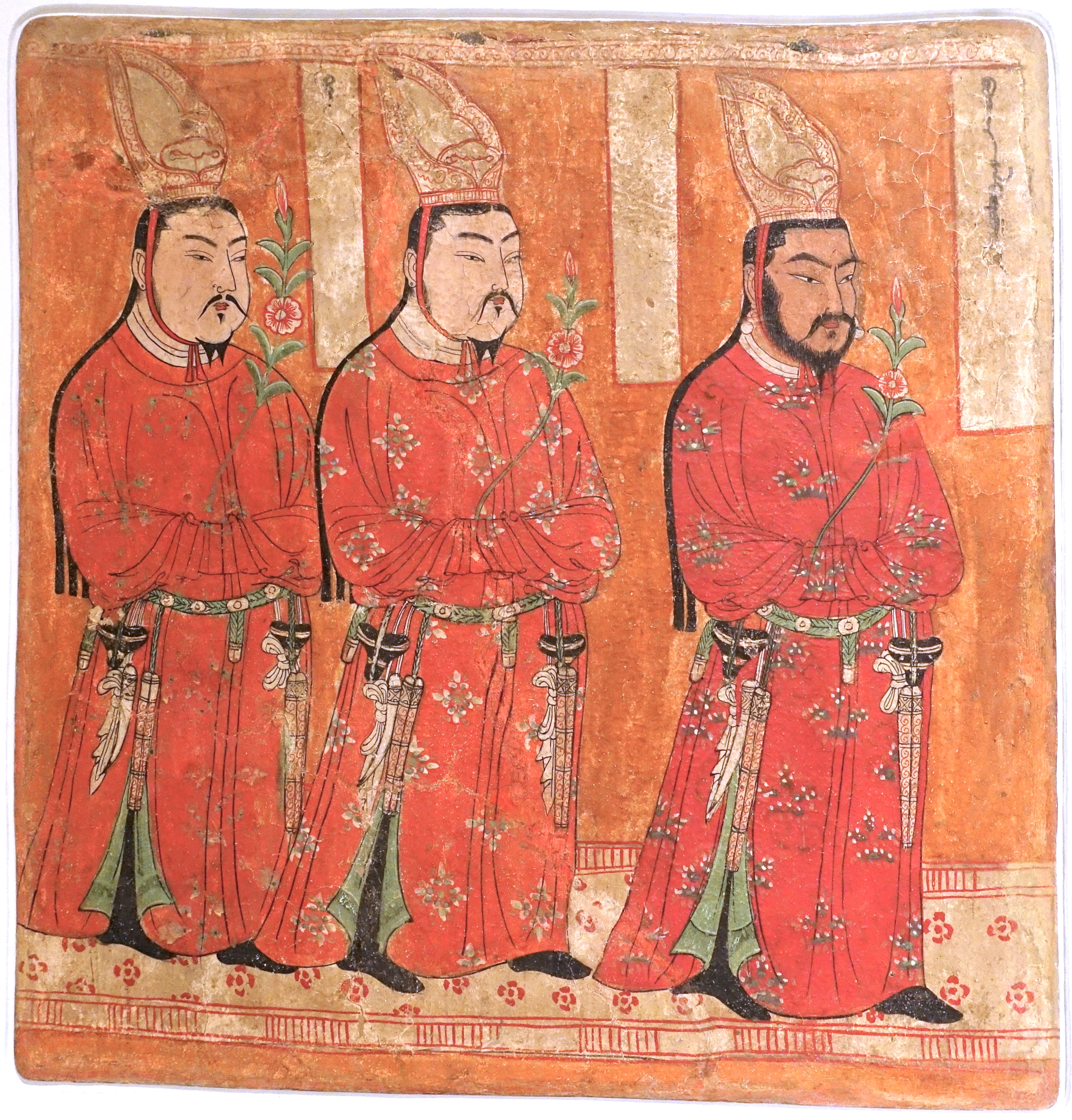
Uyghur princes from the Bezeklik Thousand Buddha Caves near Turpan, Kingdom of Qocho, 8th–9th centuries

In the tenth century, the Buddhist Iranic Saka Kingdom of Khotan was the only city-state that was not conquered yet by the Turkic Uyghur (Buddhist) and the Turkic Karakhanid (Muslim) states. The Buddhist entitites of Dunhuang and Khotan had a tight-knit partnership, with intermarriage between Dunhuang and Khotan's rulers and Dunhuang's Mogao grottos and Buddhist temples being funded and sponsored by the Khotan royals, whose likenesses were drawn in the Mogao grottoes. Halfway in the 10th century Khotan came under attack by the Karakhanid ruler Musa, a long war ensued between the Turkic Karakhanid and Buddhist Khotan which eventually ended in the conquest of Khotan by Kashgar by the Karakhanid leader Yusuf Qadir Khan around 1006.

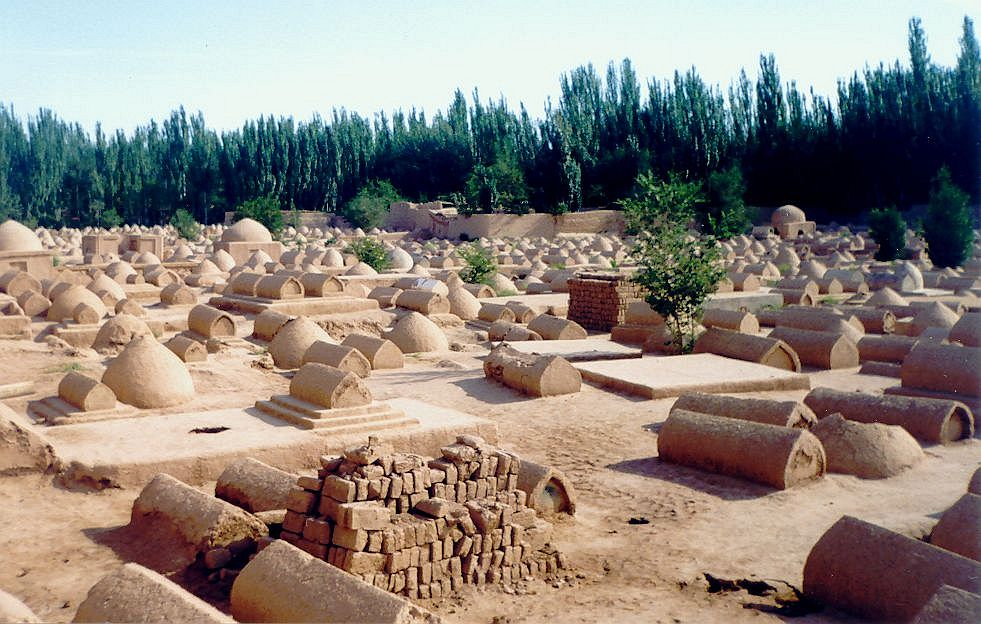
An Islamic cemetery outside the Afaq Khoja Mausoleum in Kashgar

Accounts of the Muslim Karakhanid war against the Khotanese Buddhists are given in Taẕkirah of the Four Sacrificed Imams written sometime in the period from 1700 to 1849 which told the story of four imams from Mada'in city (possibly in modern-day Iraq) who traveled to help the Islamic conquest of Khotan, Yarkand, and Kashgar by Yusuf Qadir Khan, the Karakhanid leader. The "infidels" were defeated and driven towards Khotan by Yusuf Qadir Khan and the four Imams, but the Imams were assassinated by the Buddhists prior to the last Muslim victory. After Yusuf Qadir Khan's conquest of new land in Altishahr towards the east, he adopted the title "King of the East and China".

In 1006, the Muslim Kara-Khanid ruler Yusuf Kadir (Qadir) Khan of Kashgar conquered Khotan, ending Khotan's existence as an independent state. The Islamic conquest of Khotan led to alarm in the east and Dunhuang's Cave 17, which contained Khotanese literary works, was closed shut possibly after its caretakers heard that Khotan's Buddhist buildings were razed by the Muslims, the Buddhist religion had suddenly ceased to exist in Khotan. The Karakhanid Turkic Muslim writer Mahmud al-Kashgari recorded a short Turkic language poem about the conquest:

English translation:

We came down on them like a flood,
We went out among their cities,
We tore down the idol-temples,
We shat on the Buddha's head!

In Turkic:

kälginläyü aqtïmïz
kändlär üzä čïqtïmïz
furxan ävin yïqtïmïz
burxan üzä sïčtïmïz

==== Conversion of the Buddhist Uyghurs ====
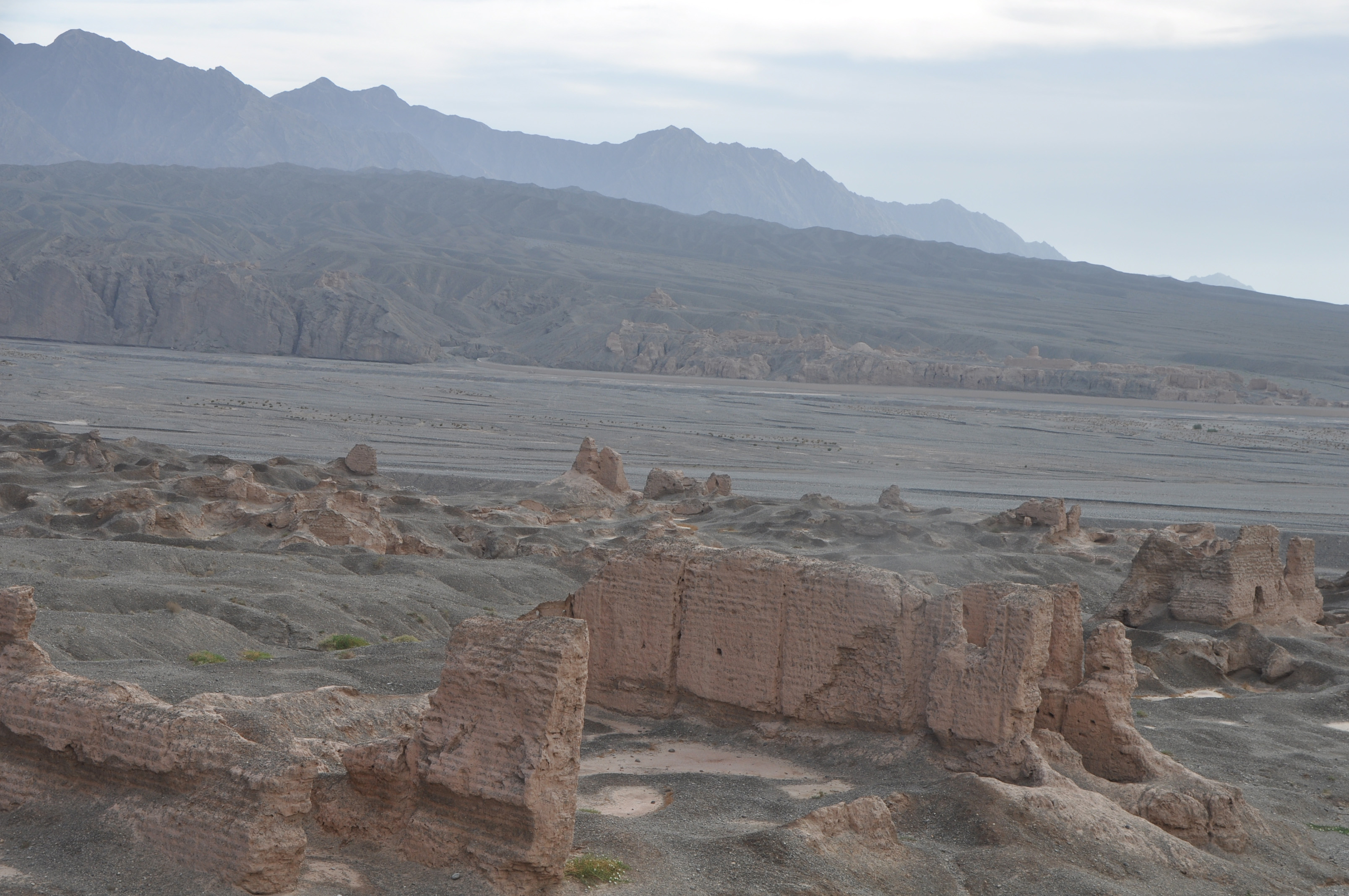
Subashi Buddhist temple ruins

The Buddhist Uyghurs of the Kingdom of Qocho and Turfan embraced Islam after conversion at the hands of the Muslim Chagatai Khizr Khwaja.

Kara Del was a Mongolian ruled and Uighur populated Buddhist Kingdom. The Muslim Chagatai Khan Mansur invaded and used the sword to make the population convert to Islam.

After being converted to Islam, the descendants of the previously Buddhist Uyghurs in Turfan believed that the "infidel Kalmuks" (Dzungars) were the ones who built Buddhist monuments in their area, in opposition to the current academic theory that it was their own ancestral legacy.

=== Before Qing conquest ===
The eastern regions of the Chagatai Khanate in the early 14th century had been inhabited by a number of Mongol nomadic tribes. These tribes resented the conversion of khan Tarmashirin to Islam and the move of the khan to the sedentary areas of Transoxiana. They were behind the revolt that ended in Tarmashirin's death. One of the khans that followed Tarmashirin, Changshi, favored the east and was non-Muslim. In the 1340s as a series of ephemeral khans struggled to hold power in Transoxiana, little attention was paid by the Chagatayids to the eastern regions. As a result, the eastern tribes there were virtually independent. The most powerful of the tribes, the Dughlats, controlled extensive territories in Moghulistan and the western Tarim Basin. In 1347 the Dughlats decided to appoint a khan of their own, and raised the Chagatayid Tughlugh Timur to the throne.

In 1509 the Dughlats, vassal rulers of the Tarim basin, rebelled against the Moghulistan Khanate and broke away. Five years later Sultan Said Khan, a brother of the Khan of Moghulistan in Turfan, conquered the Dughlats but established his own Yarkent Khanate instead. By the early 17th century, the Naqshbandi Sufi Khojas, descendants of Muhammad, had replaced the Chagatayid Khans as rulers of the Tarim Basin. There was a struggle between two Khoja factions: the Afaqi (White Mountain) and the Ishaqi (Black Mountain). The Ishaqi defeated the Afaqi and the Afaq Khoja invited the 5th Dalai Lama (the leader of the Tibetans) to intervene on his behalf in 1677. The Dalai Lama then called on his Dzungar Buddhist followers in the Dzungar Khanate to act on the invitation. The Dzungar Khanate conquered the Tarim Basin in 1678, during the Dzungar conquest of Altishahr, after which they set up Afaq Khoja as their puppet ruler.

=== Qing dynasty ===
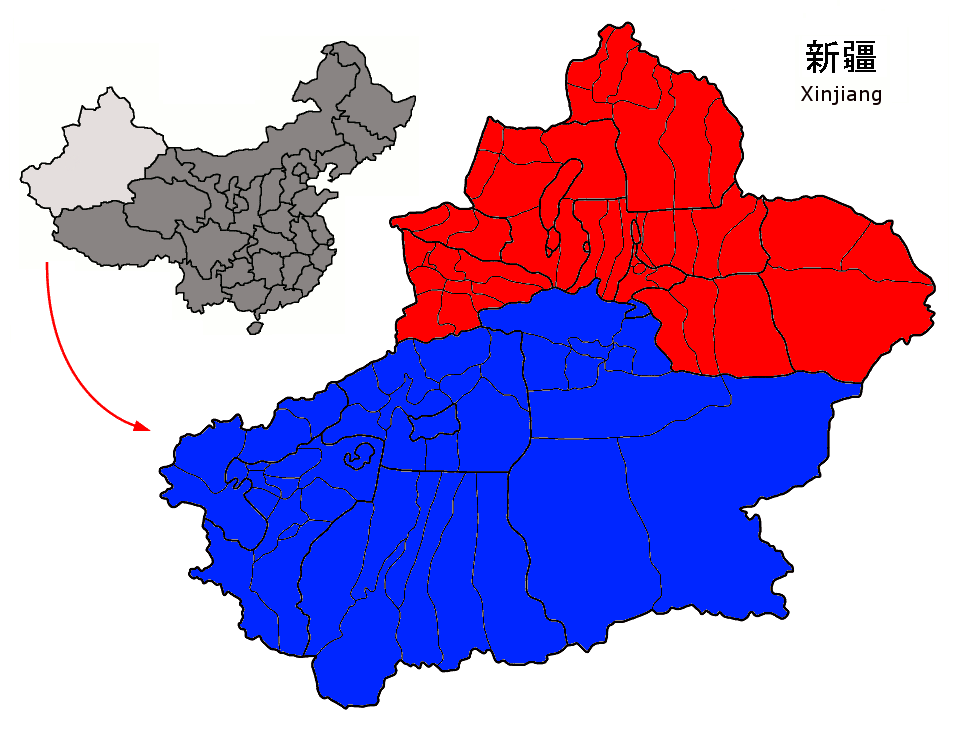
Present-day Xinjiang divided by the Tian Shan into northern and southern regions, with the Tarim Basin in blue.

Xinjiang did not exist as one unit until 1884 under Qing rule. It consisted of the two separate political entities of Dzungaria and the Tarim Basin (Eastern Turkestan). Dzungharia or Ili was called Zhunbu 準部 (Dzungar region) Tianshan Beilu 天山北路 (Northern March), "Xinjiang" 新疆 (New Frontier), or "Kalmykia" (La Kalmouquie in French). It was formerly the area of the Dzungar (or Zunghar) Khanate 準噶爾汗國, the land of the Dzungar people. The Tarim Basin was known as "Tianshan Nanlu 天山南路 (southern March), Huibu 回部 (Muslim region), Huijiang 回疆 (Muslim frontier), Chinese Turkestan, Kashgaria, Little Bukharia, East Turkestan", and the traditional Uyghur name for it was Altishahr (Uyghur: التى شهر, romanized: Altä-shähär, Алтә-шәһәр). It was formerly the area of the Eastern Chagatai Khanate 東察合台汗國, land of the Uyghur people before being conquered by the Dzungars.

== Demographics ==
The population of the Tarim Basin is estimated at approximately 5.5 million.

=== People of the Tarim Basin ===
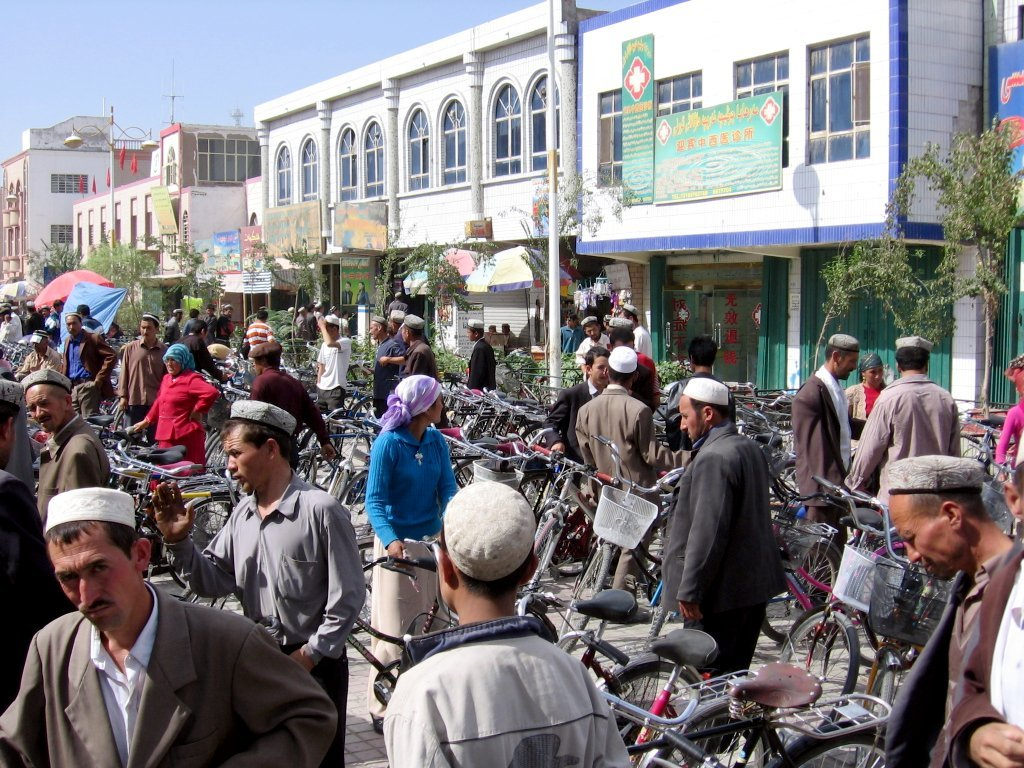
Uyghurs in Khotan

According to census figures, the Tarim Basin is dominated by the Uyghurs. They form the majority population in cities such as Kashgar, Artush, and Hotan. There are however large pockets of Han Chinese in the region, such as Aksu and Korla. There are also smaller numbers of Hui and other ethnic groups, for example, the Tajiks who are concentrated at Tashkurgan in the Kashgar Prefecture, the Kyrgyz in Kizilsu, and the Mongols in Bayingolin.

The language spoken by the earliest Tarim residents is unclear; however it is widely agreed upon that they would eventually be Indo-European speakers. The mummies have been described as being both "Caucasoid" and "Mongoloid" and mixed-race individuals are also observed, and genetics analysis also indicate that the population was of mixed ancestry in the bronze and iron age periods. Professor James A. Millward described the original Uyghurs as physically Mongoloid, giving as an example the images in Bezeklik at Temple 9 of the Uyghur patrons, until they began to mix with the Tarim Basin's original Tocharian and eastern Iranian inhabitants. However, according to a genetic study of early Uyghur remains from the Uyghur Khaganate in Mongolia, most Uyghur-period individuals exhibit a high but variable degree of west Eurasian ancestry. The east–west admixture in the Uyghur Khaganate was said to have taken place around the year 500 AD.

== Archaeology ==
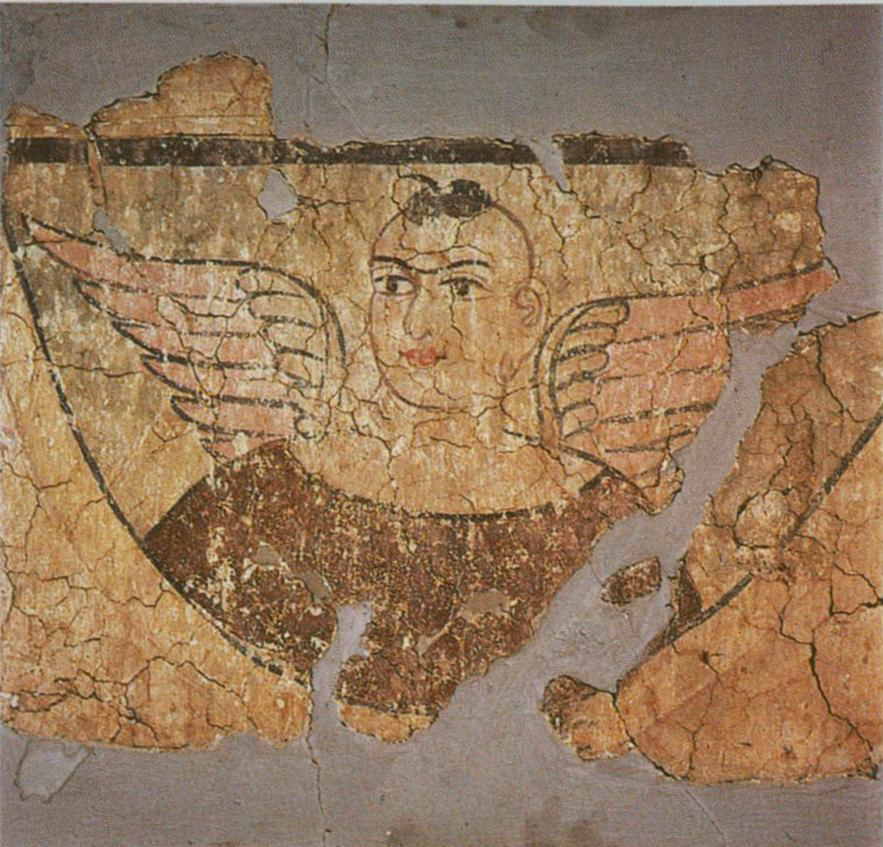
Fresco, with Hellenistic influences, from a stupa shrine, Miran

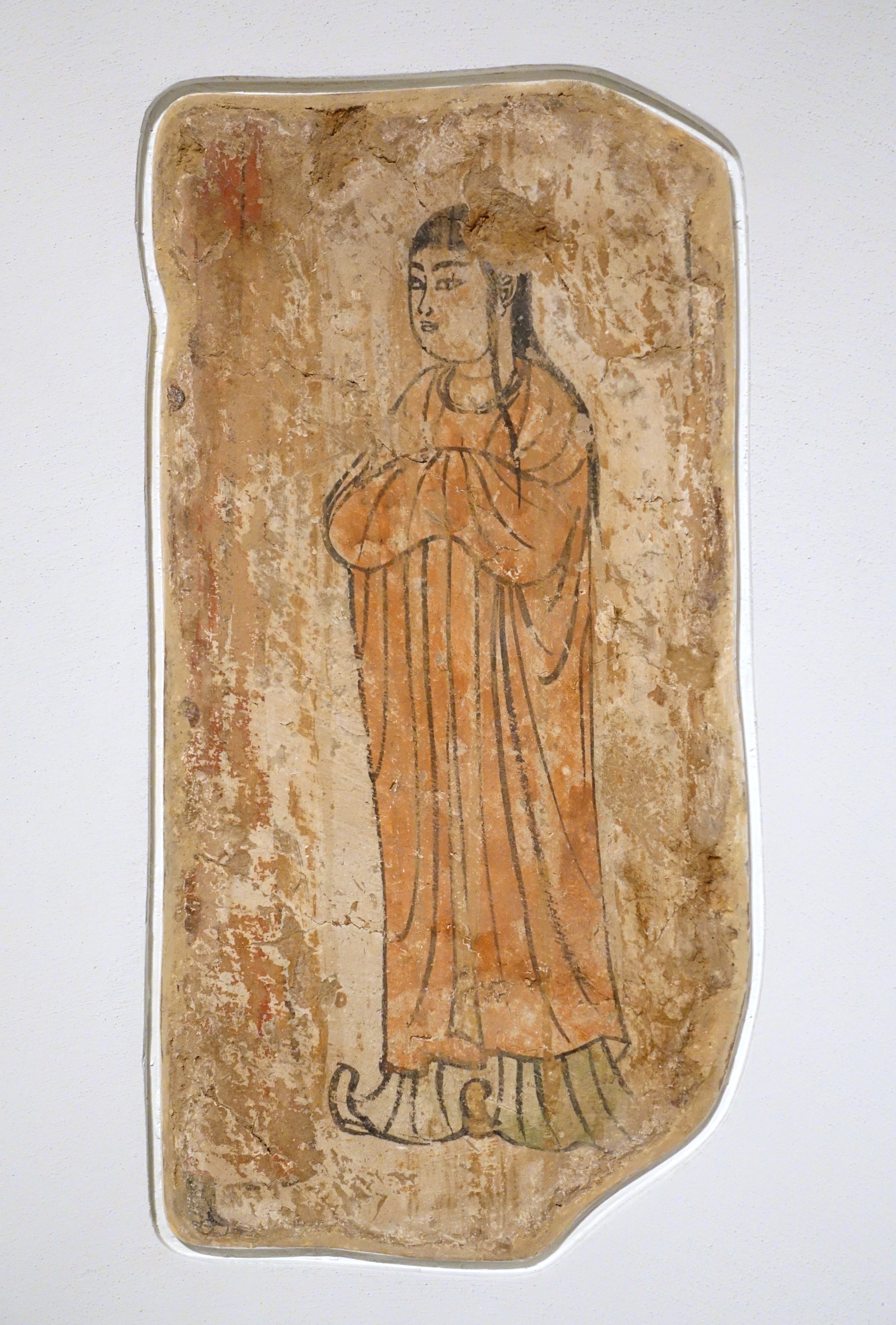
Painting of a Christian woman, Khocho (Gaochang), early period of Chinese Tang rule, 602–654 AD

Although archaeological findings are of interest in the Tarim Basin, the prime impetus for exploration was petroleum and natural gas. Recent research with help of GIS database have provided a fine-grained analysis of the ancient oasis of Niya on the Silk Road. This research led to significant findings; remains of hamlets with wattle and daub structures as well as farm land, orchards, vineyards, irrigation pools and bridges. The oasis at Niya preserves the ancient landscape. Here also have been found hundreds of 3rd and 4th century wooden accounting tablets at several settlements across the oasis. These texts are in the Kharosthi script native to today's Pakistan and Afghanistan. The texts are legal documents such as tax lists, and contracts containing detailed information pertaining to the administration of daily affairs.

Additional excavations have unearthed tombs with mummies, tools, ceramic works, painted pottery and other artistic artifacts. Such diversity was encouraged by the cultural contacts resulting from this area's position on the Silk Road. Early Buddhist sculptures and murals excavated at Miran show artistic similarities to the traditions of Central Asia and North India and stylistic aspects of paintings found there suggest that Miran had a direct connection with the West, specifically Rome and its provinces.

== Energy infrastructure ==
In 2025, China completed a 15-year infrastructure project encircling the Tarim Basin with a 750-kilovolt extra-high voltage power loop. The 4,197-kilometre (2,608-mile) network of transmission lines and substations connects multiple renewable energy sources such as wind, solar, thermal, and hydropower across five prefectures in the Xinjiang Uygur Autonomous Region.

This new grid significantly increases the region's power transmission capacity from 300,000 kilowatts to 3 million kilowatts and allows integration with other provincial grids, including Qinghai and Sichuan.

The project required the construction of nearly 10,000 transmission towers and nine substations, with much of the work taking place in the Taklamakan Desert, which covers about 60% of the basin. To support logistics and prevent dune movement, roadbeds and sand-blocking vegetation systems were implemented.

== See also ==
- Altishahr
- Chinese Turkestan
- Flaming Mountains
- Geography of China
- Junggar Basin
- Kara-Khanid Khanate
- Kunlun Mountains
- Silk Road transmission of Buddhism
- Taklamakan Desert
- Tarim mummies
- Tocharians
- Turpan water system
