= Tiemenguan =

Tiemenguan may refer to:

- Iron Gate Pass, or Tiemenguan in Chinese
- Tiemenguan City, named after the pass
