= Kaidu River =

Coordinates: 42°2′45″N 86°35′36″E

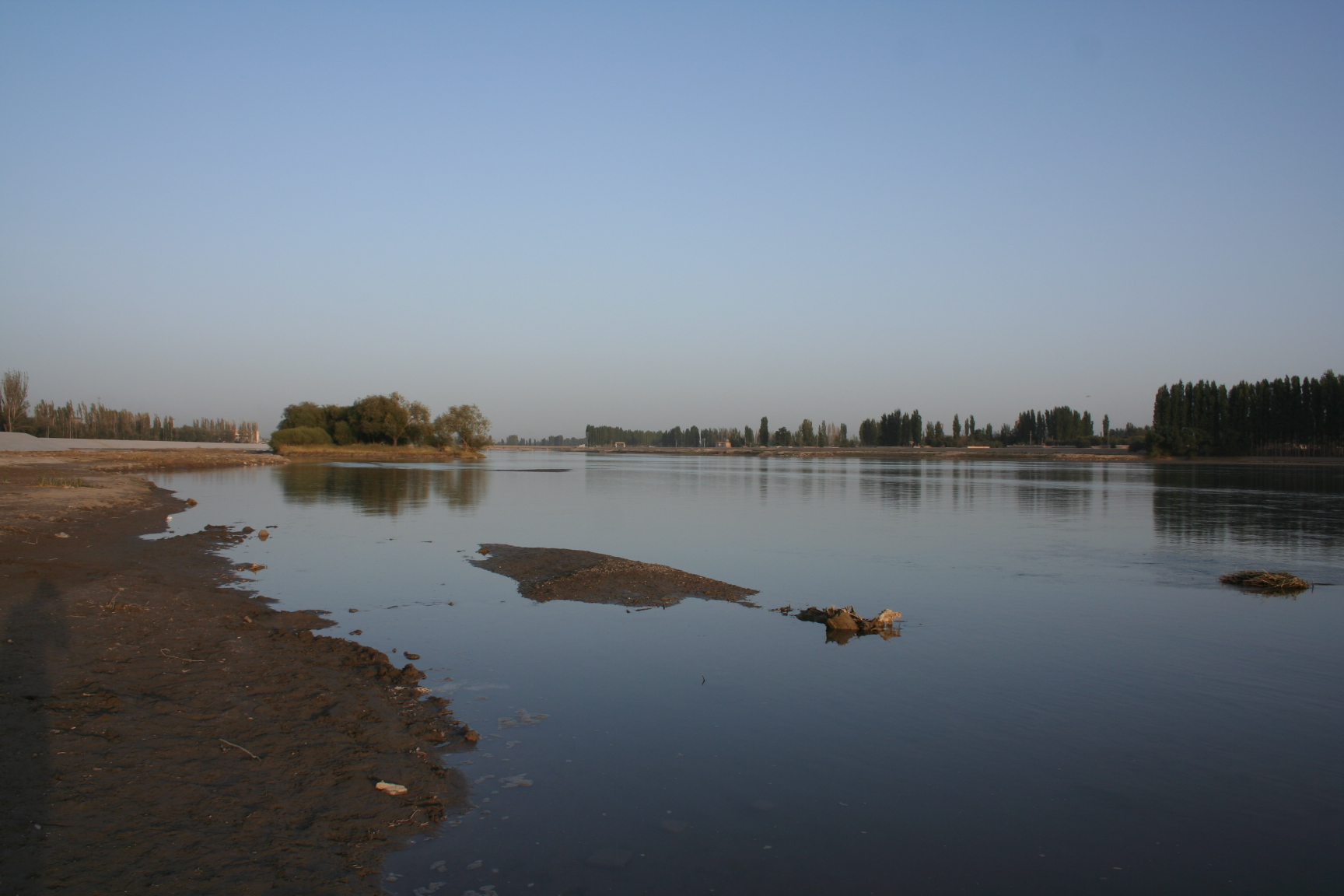
- Kaidu River in the city center of Yanqi

Location
- Country: China

Physical characteristics
- Source
  - elevation: Tian Shan
- Length: 610 km (380 mi)
- Basin size: 22,000 km^{2} (8,500 sq mi)
- Discharge
  - average: 107 m^{3}/s (3,800 cu ft/s)

The Kaidu River (Chinese: 开都河; pinyin: Kāidū Hé; Mongolian: Хайду гол; Uyghur: قايدۇ دەرياسى), also known under its ancient name Chaidu-gol, is a river in the Xinjiang Uyghur Autonomous Region of China and an important source of water for the region. The Kaidu River is responsible for many substantial effects on the environment. Affecting the land and its people in many different ways.

The sources of the Kaidu River are located on the central southern slopes of the Tian Shan from where it flows through the Yulduz Basin and the Yanqi Basin into Lake Bosten for which it is the most important tributary. The river leaves the lake under the name Kongque River (Chinese: 孔雀河; pinyin: Kǒngquè Hé), which literally means "Peacock River", but is derived from the Uyghur name "كۆنچى دەرياسى / Konchi Darya" which means "Tanner's River". The Kongque River flows through the Iron Gate Pass (simplified Chinese: 铁门关; traditional Chinese: 鐵門關; pinyin: Tiěmén Guān) into the Tarim Basin.

== Settlements on the river ==
=== Kaidu River ===
- Karashahar

=== Kongque River ===
- Tashidian
- Korla

== Significant problems ==
The Kaidu River is a determinant factor of climate change in Northwest China. The river is a result of sensitivity due to climate variability. Due to studies through the usage of hydrologic sensitivity analysis, researchers were able to make this observation and make proof of it.

Northwest China has been subjected to affects from the Kaidu River because of global warming and water perturbation. Studies have shown a correlation between the temperature and the precipitation being the leading cause to these issues. Additionally, the Kaidu River resides in an arid zone, causing many different trends in temperature due to this climate change.

Land use-conversion is also a very problematic issue that is caused in the region of Northwest China due to climate change as well. Many of the people within this area have had to deal with deceases in natural grassland area. Cultivated land increased due to this issue as well. Land reclamations were what led to this, as well as an increase in the growth of socioeconomic development. This led to an increase in water management activities, which became an issue because of the consistent change of runoff.
