= Iron Gate Pass =

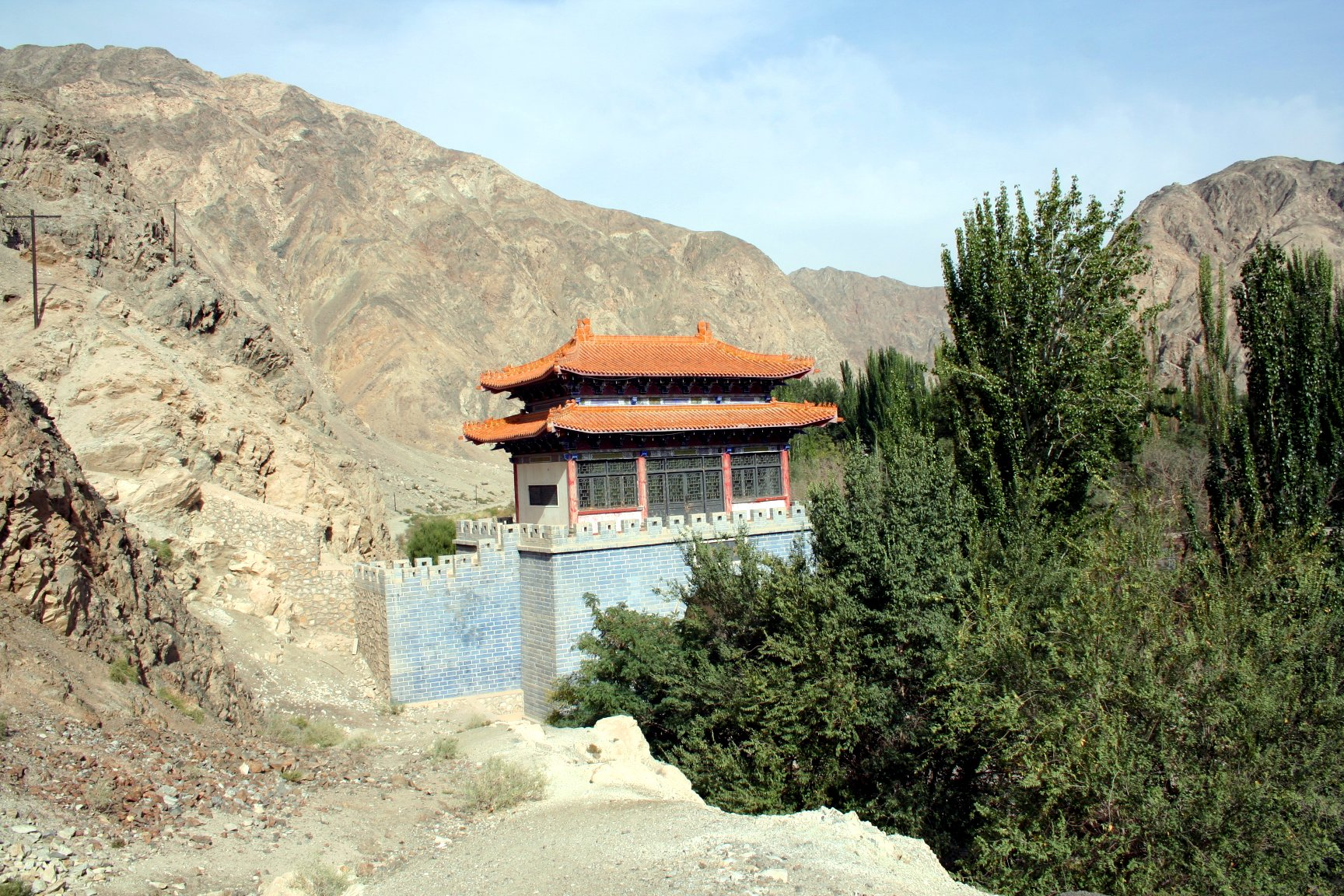
- Iron Gate Pass

- Location within Bayingolin
- Interactive map of Iron Gate Pass
- Traversed by: Kongque River

Third Approach
- Location: Xinjiang, China
- Coordinates: 41.81592°N 86.18881°E

Iron Gate Pass
- Traditional Chinese: 鐵門關
- Simplified Chinese: 铁门关
Transcriptions
Standard Mandarin
- Hanyu Pinyin: Tiěmén Guān

The Iron Gate Pass connects the Yanqi Basin and the Tarim Basin in central Xinjiang, China. The pass follows the gorge of the Kaidu River. The main settlements linked by the pass are the town of Yanqi in the Yanqi Hui Autonomous County to the north and the city of Korla in the Bayin'gholin Mongol Autonomous Prefecture in the south. The first town immediately to the north of the pass is Tashidian. The Iron Gate Pass was of historical strategic significance because it formed a vulnerable bottle-neck on the Silk Road. A military checkpoint was established at the pass during the Tang dynasty. At present, the pass is no longer part of the road infrastructure of the region and is preserved as a scenic and historical area. The modern road (G218) from Yanqi to Korla passes through the mountains to the east of the gorge.

The gorge of the Iron Gate Pass is the setting of a legendary love story. According to the legend, a princess of the Kingdom of Yanqi called Tzouhla had fallen in love with a poor herdsman named Tayir. The royal court opposed the relationship and a minister Karehan convinced the king to have Tayir killed. As the princess tried to rescue her lover from the king's soldiers, they both fell to their death in the gorge. A tumulus is said to mark the place where the two lovers were buried opposite to the gate to the pass.

== See also ==
- Yumen Pass
