= Korla Missile Test Complex =

Chinese missile test complex

- Near Korla in People's Republic of China

Site information
- Type: Missile/rocket launch facility
- Owner: People's Liberation Army
- Operator: People's Liberation Army Strategic Support Force
- Controlled by: Western Theater Command
- Open to the public: No

Site history
- Built: 2009

Garrison information
- Garrison: Unit 63618

The Korla Missile Test Complex is a People's Liberation Army (PLA) facility located outside of Korla, Xinjiang.

== Overview ==
The Korla Missile Test Complex is located in Xinjiang province. According to the US Air Force the complex is likely connected to the People's Liberation Army Strategic Support Force (PLASSF).

As of 2014 the base primarily consisted of two launch pads and a central support area.

Testing of the Dong Neng-3 (DN-3) has primarily occurred at the Korla Missile Test Complex.

== Units ==
PLA Unit 63618 is based at the Korla Missile Test Complex, the unit is tasked with ballistic missile defense.

== History ==
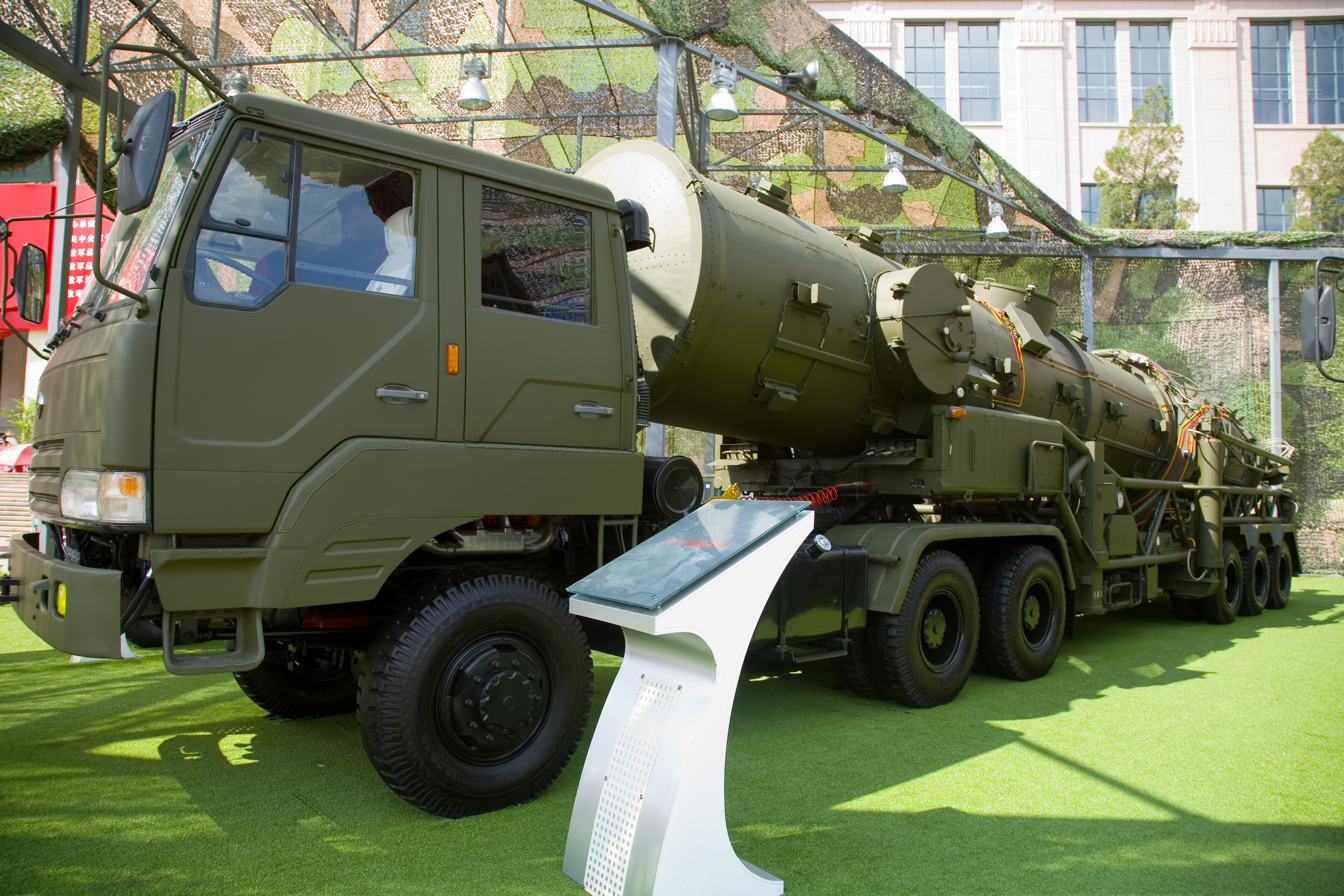
DF-21

The construction of the Korla Missile Test Complex began in 2009.

In 2015 the DN-3’s anti-satellite capabilities are believed to have been tested with a launch from Korla.

In 2016 the complex hosted a midcourse ballistic missile defense test. The PLA claimed that four successful tests had taken place at Korla.

A 2017 launch from Korla is believed to have been a test of a HQ-19 anti-satellite weapon.

In February 2018 the DN-3 was launched from Korla against a DF-21 based target in space.

== See also ==
- Lop Nur
