= Korla =

Korla: 库尔勒市 (Chinese); كورلا شەھىرى (Uyghur); ᠺᠦᠷᠡᠯ᠎ᠡ ᠬᠣᠲᠠ (Mongolian); ᡍᡆᡃᠷᠯᠠᠯ ᡍᡆᡐᡆᠨ (Oirat); Kurla, Kuerle
- County-level city
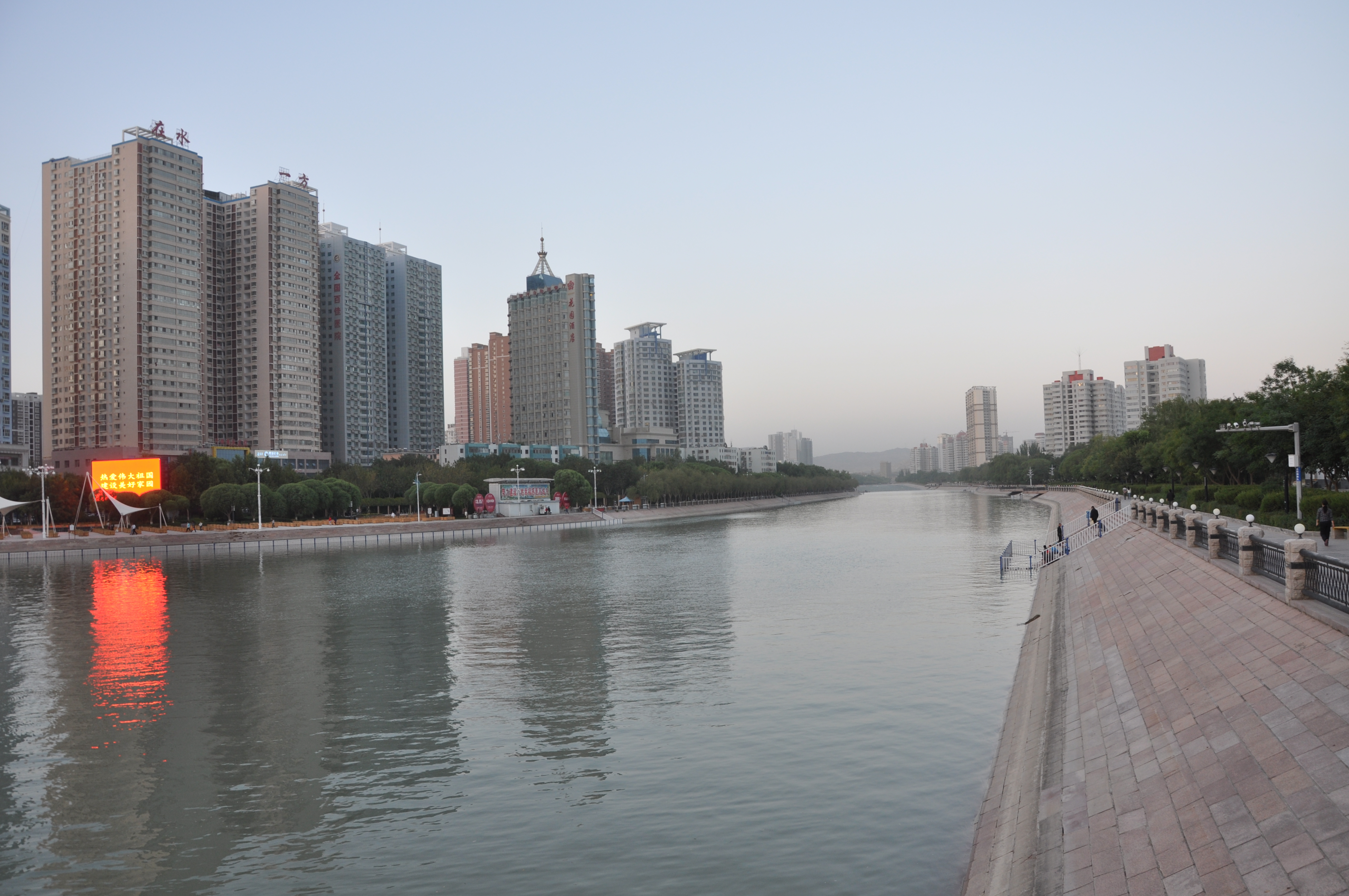

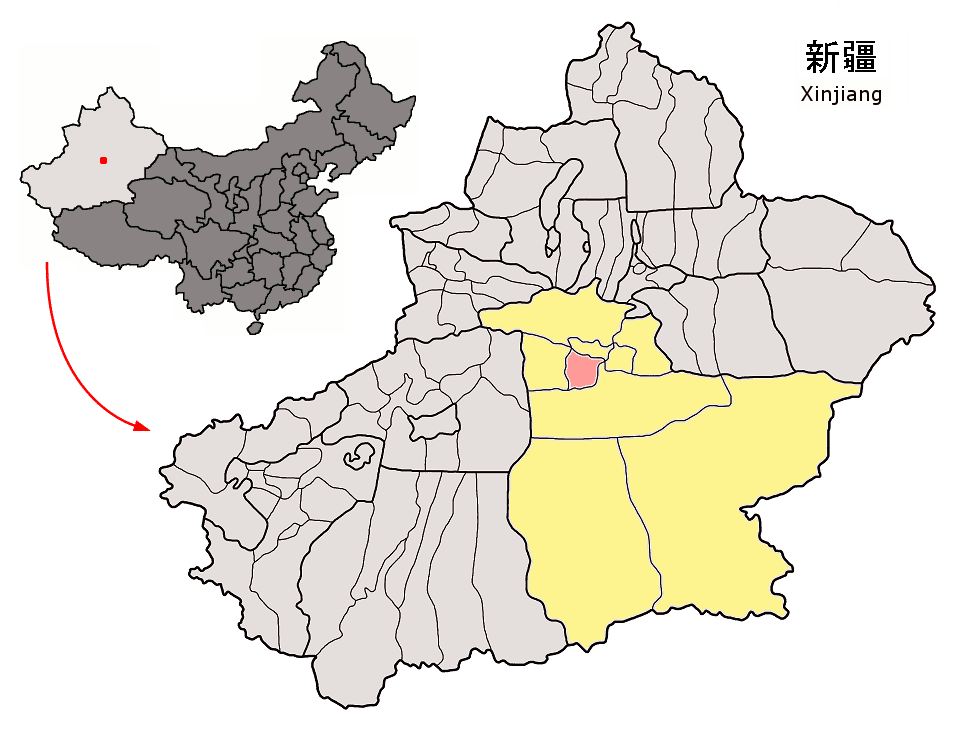
- Location of Korla City (pink) in Bayingolin Prefecture (yellow) and Xinjiang

- Location of the city centre in Xinjiang Korla (Xinjiang) Korla (China)
- Coordinates (Korla municipal government): 41°43′33″N 86°10′29″E
- Country: China
- Autonomous region: Xinjiang
- Autonomous prefecture: Bayingolin
- Municipal seat: Xincheng Subdistrict

Area
  - County-level city: 7,219.48 km^{2} (2,787.46 sq mi)
  - Urban: 246 km^{2} (95 sq mi)

Population (2020)
  - County-level city: 779,352
  - Density: 107.951/km^{2} (279.592/sq mi)
  - Urban (2018): 770,000
  - Urban density: 3,100/km^{2} (8,100/sq mi)
- Time zone: UTC+8 (China Standard (Note: Locals in Xinjiang frequently observe UTC+6 (Xinjiang Time), 2 hours behind Beijing.))
- Postal code: 841000
- Area code: 0996
- Website: www.xjkel.gov.cn

Korla

Chinese name
- Simplified Chinese: 库尔勒
- Traditional Chinese: 庫爾勒
- Literal meaning: Krorain
Transcriptions
Standard Mandarin
- Hanyu Pinyin: Kù'ěrlè
- Wade–Giles: Kʻu⁴-êrh³-lê⁴

Mongolian name
- Mongolian script: ᠺᠦᠷᠡᠯ᠎ᠡ

Uyghur name
- Uyghur: كورلا
Transcriptions
- Latin Yëziqi: Korla
- Yengi Yeziⱪ: Korla
- SASM/GNC: Korla
- Siril Yëziqi: Корла

Korla, also known as Kurla or Kuerle, is the second largest city by population in Xinjiang, China. It is a county-level city and the seat of Bayingolin Mongol Autonomous Prefecture, the largest prefecture of China.

Korla has existed since at least the Han dynasty. Korla is known for its production of fragrant pears and is a production center for the Tarim oil fields.

== History ==
=== Han dynasty ===
Korla was known as Yuli (尉犁) (reconstructed pronunciation of first character: *i̯wəd) during the Han dynasty. Yuli is said in the Hanshu or 'History of the Former Han' (covering the period 125 BCE to 23 CE), to have had 1,200 households, 9,600 individuals and 2,000 people able to bear arms. It also mentions that it adjoined Shanshan and Qiemo (Charchan) to the south.

In 61 CE, the Xiongnu led some 30,000 troops from 15 kingdoms including Korla, Karashahr, and Kucha in a successful attack on Khotan.

In 94 CE, the Chinese general Ban Chao sent soldiers to punish the kingdoms of Yanqi (Karashahr), Weixu (Hoxud), Yuli (Korla), and Shanguo (in the western Kuruk mountains).

"He then sent the heads of the two kings of Yanqi (Karashahr) and Yuli (Korla) to the capital where they were hung in front of the residences of the Man and Yi princes in the capital (Luoyang). (Ban) Chao then appointed Yuan Meng, who was the Yanqi (Karashahr) Marquis of the Left, king (of Kashgar). The kings of Yuli (Korla), Weixu (Hoxud), and Shanguo (in the western Kuruk mountains) were all replaced."

After the rebellion of the "Western Regions" (106−125 CE), only the kings of Korla and Hoxud refused to submit to the Chinese. Ban Yong, the son of Ban Chao, along with the Governor of Dunhuang, attacked and defeated them.

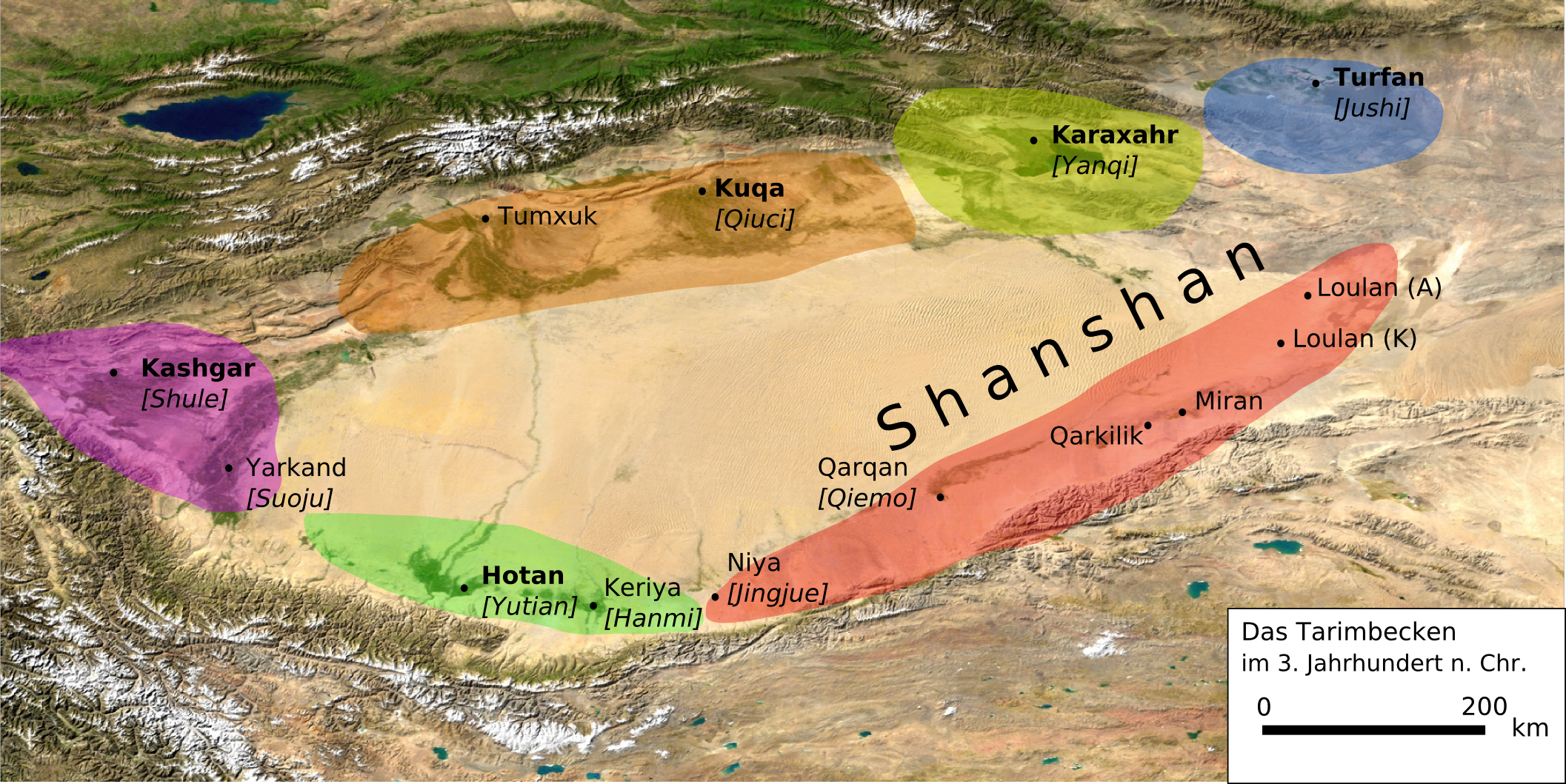
Tarim Basin in the 3rd century

=== Three Kingdoms era ===
The 3rd century Weilüe records that Korla, Hoxud and Shanwang (Shanguo) were all dependencies of Karashahr.

=== Yettishar ===
The contemporaneous historian Musa Sayrami (1836–1917) stated that ruler Yaqub Beg of Yettishar was poisoned on May 30, 1877, in Korla by the former hakim (local city ruler) Niyaz Hakim Beg of Yarkand, although Niyaz Hakim Beg and other sources stated that his death was by suicide or in battle against the Qing dynasty.

=== Qing dynasty ===
Francis Younghusband, passed through "Korlia" in 1887 on his overland journey from Beijing to India. He described it as being prosperous and the country round about well-cultivated, with more land under cultivation than any other town he had passed. Maize seemed to be the major crop but rice was also grown. There was a small Chinese town, about 400 yards (370 m) square with mud walls about 35 feet (11 m) high and with a ditch. There were round bastions at the angles, but none at the gateway. A mile (1.6 km) south was the Turk town, but its walls were in ruins. It had one main street about 700 yards (640 m) long. "The shops are somewhat better than at Karashar, but not so good as at Turfan."

=== People's Republic of China ===
Korla was incorporated as a city on September 30, 1979.

On January 8, 1965, more than 170 Chinese Communist cadres were immolated by Mongols during an anti-Communist riot at a state farm in Korla (Kurla).

In September 2019, drone video appeared which ASPI (a defense industries funded Australian think tank) alleged as showing the mass transfer of hundreds of ethnic minority prisoners, which drew the comment "deeply disturbing" from Australian Foreign Minister Marise Payne in describing the video.

== Geography ==
Korla is approximately 200 kilometres (120 mi) southwest from Ürümqi, although, due to the intervening Tian Shan, the road distance is considerably greater.

The Iron Gate Pass (Tiemen Pass) leading to Karasahr is about 7 kilometres (4.3 mi) north of the city and, as it was easily defended, playing an important part in protecting the ancient Silk Roads from raiding nomads from the north.

The Kaidu River, also known as the Konqi River or Kongque River, flows through the center of Korla, a unique feature amongst cities in Xinjiang. While the literal meaning of the Chinese name "Kongque River" is "Peacock River", the name originates from a semantically distorted transliteration of the Uyghur name "Konqi Darya" which means "Tanner's River".

=== Climate ===
Korla has a cold desert climate (Köppen climate classification BWk) with extreme seasonal variation in temperature. The monthly 24-hour average temperature ranges from −6.6 °C (20.1 °F) in January to 26.8 °C (80.2 °F), and the annual mean is 12.0 °C (53.6 °F), which is still warmer than most locales at the same latitude further east in the country. Precipitation totals only 59.2 millimetres (2.33 in) annually, and mostly falls in summer, as compared to an annual evaporation rate of about 2,800 mm (110 in); there are about 3,000 hours of bright sunshine annually. The frost-free period averages 210 days. The period between April and October closely resembles subtropical climates, but the continental nature is facilitated by the rapid drop of temperatures going into winter.

Climate data for Korla, elevation 900 m (3,000 ft), (1991–2020 normals, extremes 1964–present)
Month	Jan	Feb	Mar	Apr	May	Jun	Jul	Aug	Sep	Oct	Nov	Dec	Year
Record high °C (°F)	8.6 (47.5)	17.0 (62.6)	26.8 (80.2)	35.3 (95.5)	36.5 (97.7)	38.3 (100.9)	40.5 (104.9)	40.0 (104.0)	37.0 (98.6)	30.9 (87.6)	20.6 (69.1)	11.1 (52.0)	40.5 (104.9)
Mean daily maximum °C (°F)	−1.9 (28.6)	5.5 (41.9)	14.6 (58.3)	22.9 (73.2)	28.0 (82.4)	31.8 (89.2)	33.3 (91.9)	32.2 (90.0)	27.4 (81.3)	19.6 (67.3)	9.4 (48.9)	−0.1 (31.8)	18.6 (65.4)
Daily mean °C (°F)	−7.1 (19.2)	−0.4 (31.3)	8.4 (47.1)	16.3 (61.3)	21.4 (70.5)	25.5 (77.9)	27.0 (80.6)	25.7 (78.3)	20.2 (68.4)	11.6 (52.9)	2.6 (36.7)	−5.2 (22.6)	12.2 (53.9)
Mean daily minimum °C (°F)	−11.8 (10.8)	−5.8 (21.6)	2.3 (36.1)	9.8 (49.6)	14.6 (58.3)	19.1 (66.4)	20.7 (69.3)	19.3 (66.7)	13.7 (56.7)	5.0 (41.0)	−2.7 (27.1)	−9.3 (15.3)	6.2 (43.2)
Record low °C (°F)	−26.7 (−16.1)	−23.4 (−10.1)	−10.4 (13.3)	−3.0 (26.6)	0.5 (32.9)	6.2 (43.2)	10.6 (51.1)	7.9 (46.2)	1.9 (35.4)	−4.4 (24.1)	−16.6 (2.1)	−24.4 (−11.9)	−26.7 (−16.1)
Average precipitation mm (inches)	1.5 (0.06)	1.3 (0.05)	1.3 (0.05)	2.7 (0.11)	8.5 (0.33)	12.7 (0.50)	12.4 (0.49)	9.8 (0.39)	4.6 (0.18)	3.1 (0.12)	1.0 (0.04)	2.3 (0.09)	61.2 (2.41)
Average precipitation days (≥ 0.1 mm)	2.4	1.1	0.7	1.3	2.9	4.6	5.8	4.6	2.6	1.4	0.9	2.6	30.9
Average snowy days	6.7	2.4	0.6	0.3	0	0	0	0	0	0.2	1.3	6.2	17.7
Average relative humidity (%)	65	50	34	30	33	37	41	42	46	51	58	68	46
Mean monthly sunshine hours	170.5	192.6	232	249.3	280.1	274.4	287.3	278.3	267.8	256.8	201.6	154.5	2,845.2
Percentage possible sunshine	57	63	62	62	62	60	63	66	73	76	70	55	64
Source 1: China Meteorological Administration NOAAall-time February high
Source 2: Weather China

== Administrative divisions ==
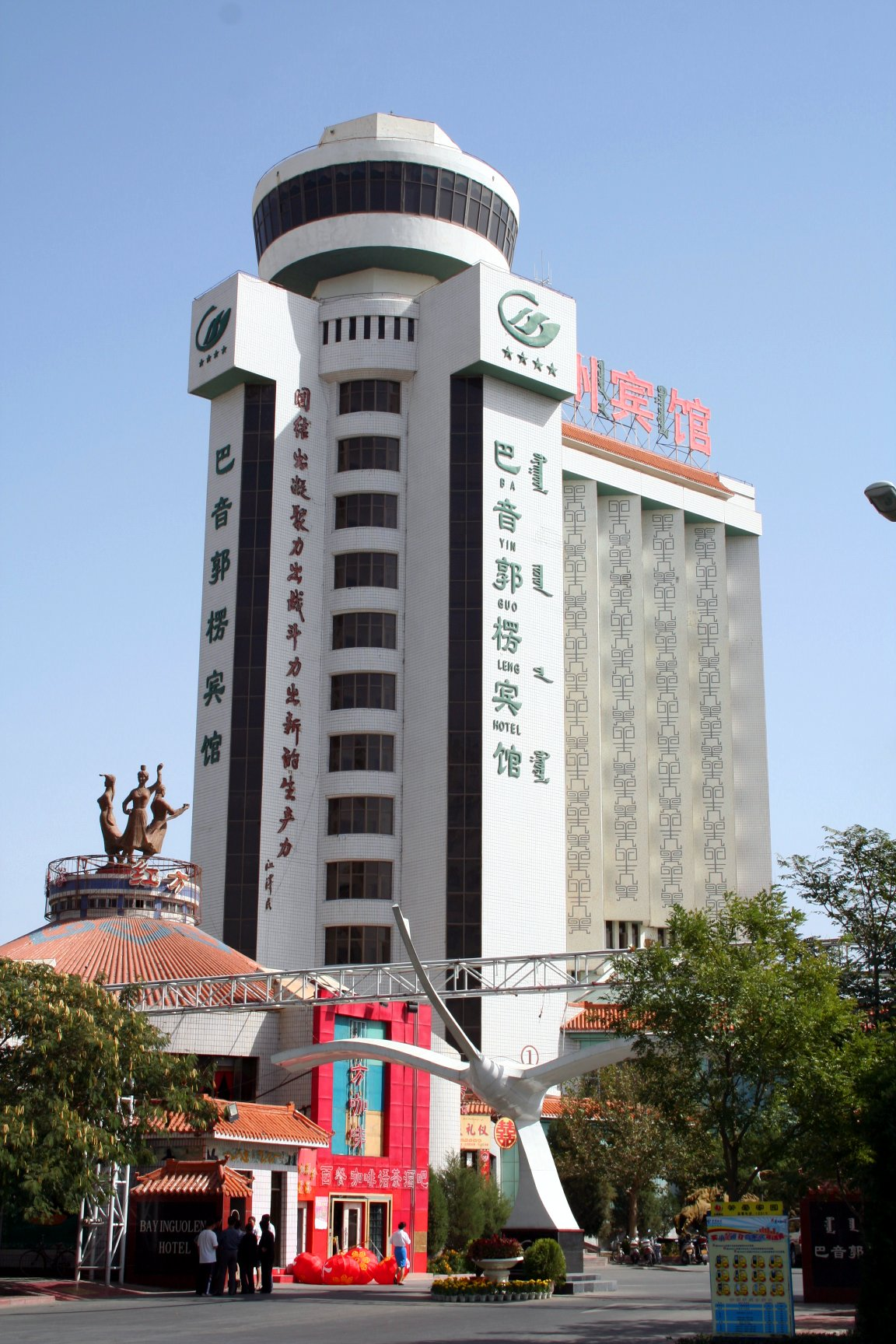
Bayingolin Hotel in Korla; its name is spelled out in Chinese, Mongolian, and English.

Korla administers 7 subdistricts, 3 towns and 9 townships.

Name	Simplified Chinese	Hanyu Pinyin	Uyghur (UEY)	Uyghur Latin (ULY)	Mongolian (traditional)	Mongolian (Cyrillic)	Administrative division code
Subdistricts
Tuanjie Subdistrict	团结街道	Tuánjié Jiēdào	ئىتتىپاق كوچا باشقارمىسى	Ittipaq kocha bashqarmisi			652801001
Saybagh Subdistrict	萨依巴格街道	Sàyībāgé Jiēdào	سايباغ كوچا باشقارمىسى	saybagh kocha bashqarmisi			652801002
Tianshan Subdistrict	天山街道	Tiānshān Jiēdào	تەڭرىتاغ كوچا باشقارمىسى	tengritagh kocha bashqarmisi			652801003
Xincheng Subdistrict	新城街道	Xīnchéng Jiēdào	يېڭىشەھەر كوچا باشقارمىسى	yëngisheher kocha bashqarmisi	ᠰᠢᠨ ᠴᠧᠩ ᠵᠡᠭᠡᠯᠢ ᠭᠤᠳᠤᠮᠵᠢ	Шин цэн зээл гудамж	652801004
Jianshe Subdistrict	建设街道	Jiànshè Jiēdào	بەشيۈتلۈك كوچا باشقارمىسى	beshyütlük kocha bashqarmisi			652801005
Chaoyang Subdistrict	朝阳街道	Chāoyáng Jiēdào	چاۋياڭ كوچا باشقارمىسى	chawyang kocha bashqarmisi			652801006
Lixiang Subdistrict	梨香街道	Líxiāng Jiēdào	نەشپۇتزار كوچا باشقارمىسى	neshputzar kocha bashqarmisi			652801007
Towns
Tashidian Town	塔什店镇	Tǎshídiàn Zhèn	تاشدەن بازىرى	tashden baziri	ᠲᠠᠱᠠᠳᠢᠶᠠᠨ ᠪᠠᠯᠭᠠᠰᠤ	Ташадиан балгас	652801100
Shanghu Town	上户镇	Shànghù Zhèn	شاڭخۇ بازىرى	shangxu baziri			652801101
Shinigha Town	西尼尔镇	Xīní'ěr Zhèn	شىنىغا بازىرى	shinigha baziri			652801102
Townships
Tëkichi Township	铁克其乡	Tiěkèqí Xiāng	تېكىچى يېزىسى	tëkichi yëzisi			652801200
Charibagh Township	恰尔巴格乡	Qiǎ'ěrbāgé Xiāng	چارباغ يېزىسى	charbagh yëzisi			652801201
Yëngisheher Township	英下乡	Yīngxià Xiāng	يېڭىشەھەر يېزىسى	yëngisheher yëzisi			652801202
Lengger Township	兰干乡	Lángàn Xiāng	لەڭگەر يېزىسى	lengger yëzisi			652801203
Qosh'ëriq Township	和什力克乡	Héshílìkè Xiāng	قوشئېرىق يېزىسى	qosh'ëriq yëzisi			652801204
Qarayulghun Township	哈拉玉宫乡	Hālāyùgōng Xiāng	قارايۇلغۇن يېزىسى	qarayulghun yëzisi			652801205
Awat Township	阿瓦提乡	Āwǎtí Xiāng	ئاۋات يېزىسى	Awat yëzisi			652801206
Towurchi Township	托布力其乡	Tuōbùlìqí Xiāng	توۋۇرچى يېزىسى	towurchi yëzisi			652801207
Puhui Township	普惠乡	Pǔhuì Xiāng	پۇخۇي يېزىسى	puxuy yëzisi			652801208

Others:

- Charchi Horticultural Farm (库尔楚园艺场, چەرچى باغۋەنچىلىك مەيدانى)
- Baotouhu Farm (包头湖农场, باۋتۇخۇ دېھقانچىلىق مەيدانى)
- Puhui Farm (普惠农场, پۇخۇي دېھقانچىلىق مەيدانى)
- Bayingolin Awat Farm (巴州阿瓦提农场, ئاۋات دېھقانچىلىق مەيدانى)
- Bayingolin Saydöng Horticultural Farm (巴州沙依东园艺场, ئوبلاستلىق سايدۆڭ باغۋەنچىلىك مەيدانى)
- Bayingolin Dairy Farm (巴州奶牛场, ئوبلاستلىق سۈتچىلىك فېرمىسى)
- Puhui Ranch (普惠牧场, پۇخۇي چارۋىچىلىق مەيدانى)
- Jingji Ranch (经济牧场, ئىقتىساد چارۋىچىلىق مەيدانى)
- Korla City Seed Farm (良种场)

== Demographics ==
In the 2010 Chinese census, the city had a total population of 549,324 people, a significant increase from the 381,943 recorded in the 2000 census. The city is home to 23 ethnic groups.

The city had 430,000 inhabitants in 2007, increasing with 20,000 people every year, majority of whom were Han Chinese, with a large minority of Uyghurs (about 100,000) and smaller numbers of Mongols and Huis.

The proportion of nationalities in Korla City, 2018
Nationality	Percentage
Han	66.7%
Uyghurs	28.9%
Hui	2.4%
Mongols	1.2%
Manchus	0.2%
Others	0.6%
Source of the population statistics :

== Economy ==
Korla has long been the biggest centre in the region after Karashahr/Yanqi itself, having abundant water and extensive farmlands, as well as controlling the main routes to the south and west of Karashahr/Yanqi. Due to the discovery of oil in the Taklamakan Desert, Korla is now both more populous and developed than Karashar/Yanqi. PetroChina's Tarim oil fields operations are headquartered in Korla.

The city reported a fiscal revenue of 4.572 billion Yuan in 2019. In the same year, the city's GDP grew 5.6%, fixed asset investment grew 10%, the public budget grew 5%, retail sales grew 8%, and the city's CPI grew 2.3%.

Korla is known for its production of fragrant pears (库尔勒香梨).

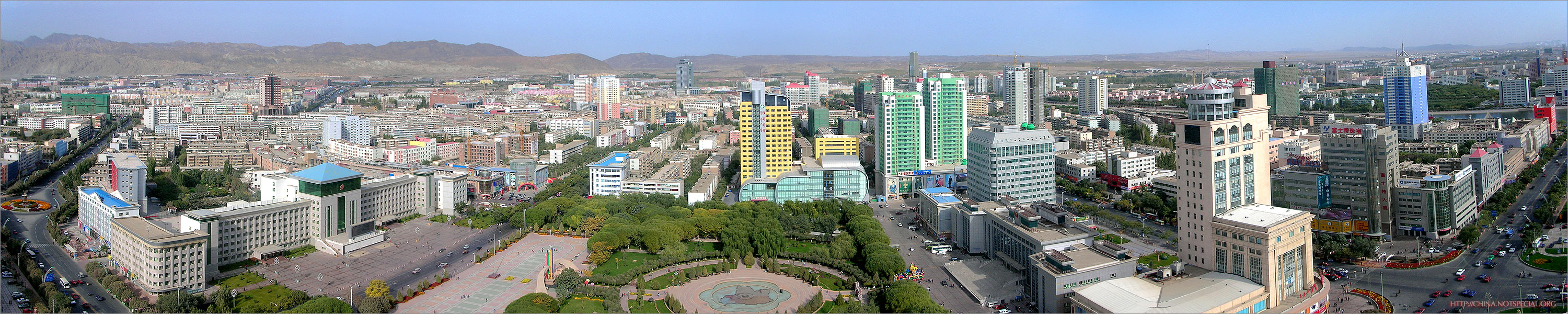
A panorama of Korla

== Transportation ==
Korla is a regional transportation hub, served by the national highways G218, G314, the Southern Xinjiang Railway, Golmud–Korla railway, Hotan–Ruoqiang railway and the Ku'erle Licheng Airport.

== Cultural sights ==
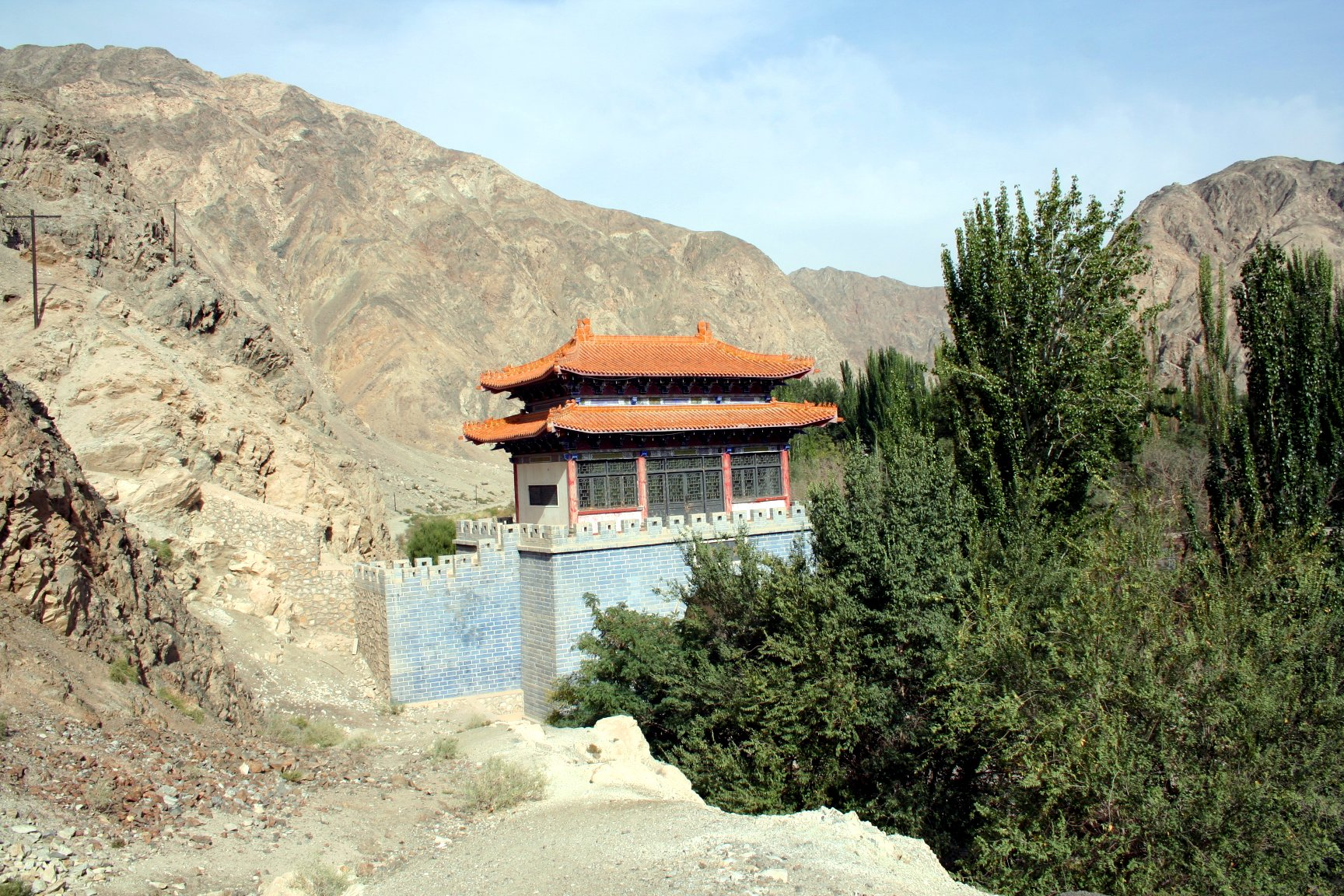
Iron Gate Pass

The city's main attractions include the Iron Gate Pass, Lotus Pond (莲花池), Sun Island (太阳岛), Princess Peak (公主峰), Yuzigan Old City (玉子干旧城), Tuowuqi Ancient City (托务其古城), Airlike Ancient City (爱力克古城), Ku'erchu Mound (库尔楚土墩), Jiamai Mosque (加麦清真寺), and Yeyungou Ruins (野云沟遗址).

== Demographics ==
According to the Seventh National Census in 2020, the city's Permanent Population (hukou) was 1,613,979. Compared with 21,813,334 people in the Sixth National Census in 2010, the number increased by 4,039,011, representing a growth of 18.52%, with an average annual growth rate of 1.71%. They are respectively 13.14 percentage points and 1.18 percentage points higher than the national average level.

== See also ==
- Yuli County
- Korla Missile Test Complex

== Notes and references ==
=== Sources ===
- Hill, John E. (2009). Through the Jade Gate to Rome: A Study of the Silk Routes during the Later Han Dynasty, 1st to 2nd Centuries CE. BookSurge, Charleston, South Carolina. ISBN 978-1-4392-2134-1.
- Mallory, J. P. and Mair, Victor H. 2000. The Tarim Mummies: Ancient China and the Mystery of the Earliest Peoples from the West. Thames & Hudson, London.
- Stein, Aurel M. 1921. Serindia: Detailed report of explorations in Central Asia and westernmost China, 5 vols. London & Oxford. Clarendon Press. Reprint: Delhi. Motilal Banarsidass. 1980.
- Stein Aurel M. 1928. Innermost Asia: Detailed report of explorations in Central Asia, Kan-su and Eastern Iran, 5 vols. Clarendon Press. Reprint: New Delhi. Cosmo Publications. 1981.
- von Le Coq, Albert. 1928. Buried Treasures of Turkestan. Reprint with Introduction by Peter Hopkirk, Oxford University Press. 1985.
