= Tashidian =

Tashidian 塔什店镇
- Town
- Tashidian Town
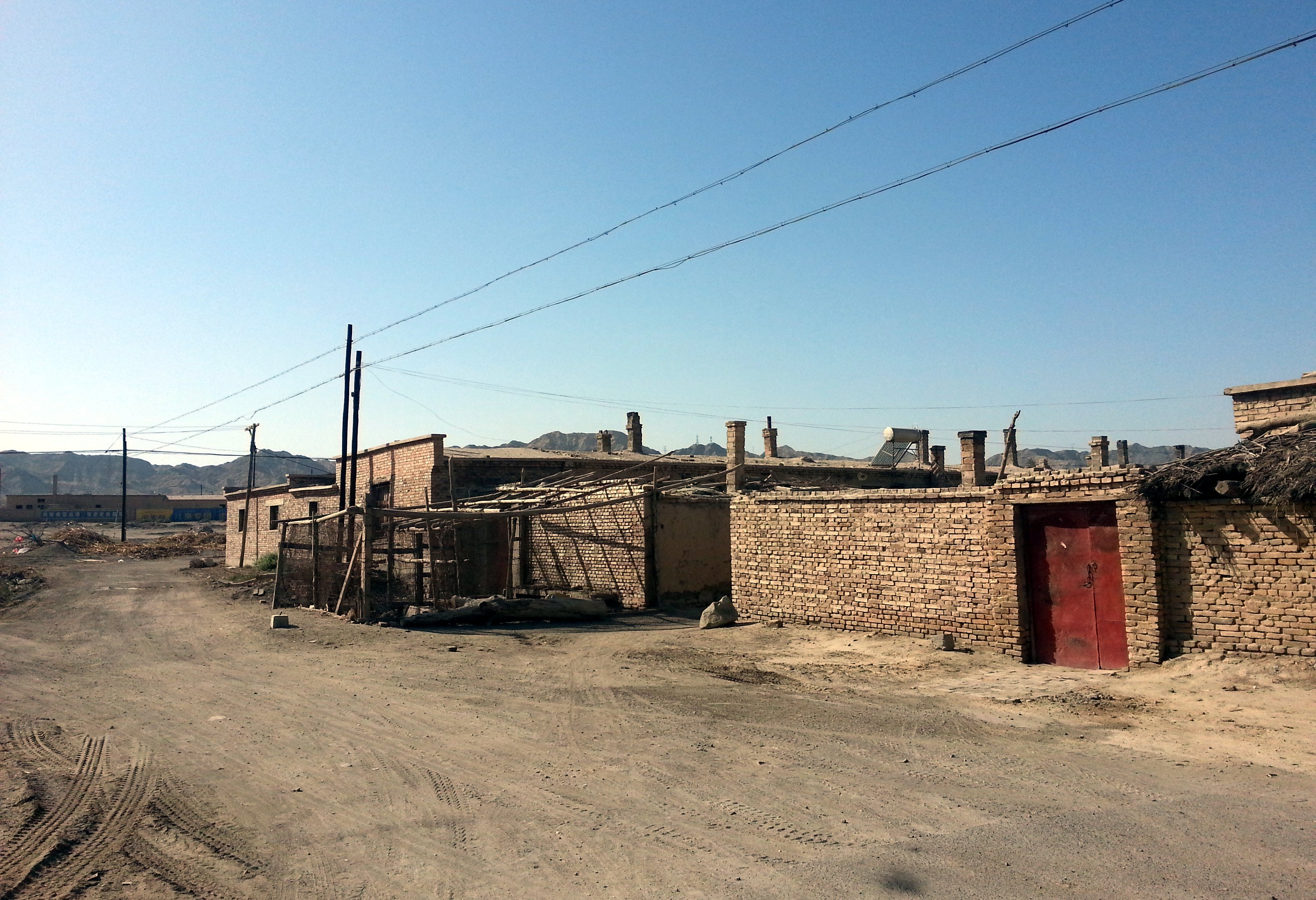
- Interactive map of Tashidian
- Coordinates: 41°50′16.37″N 86°16′36.73″E
- Country: China
- Autonomous region: Xinjiang
- Autonomous prefecture: Bayin'gholin Mongol Autonomous Prefecture
- City: Korla

Tashidian (Chinese: 塔什店; pinyin: Tǎshídiàn; Wade–Giles: T'a^{3}-shih^{2}-tien^{4}, Oirat: ᠲᠠᠱᠠᠳᠢᠶᠠᠨ tašadiyan, Uyghur: تاشدەن) is a town in the Bayingolin Mongol Autonomous Prefecture, in the Xinjiang Uyghur Autonomous Region, China. It is located on the Kongque River and national road G218, about 10 km to the north of Korla. The town was founded in an effort to access the natural resources of the area. It is the site of a coal mine (Tashidian Union Mining Company) and thermoelectric power plant. At Tashidian, the Kongque River is spanned by the Tashidian Bridge, a stone arch road bridge with a span of 40m and a total length of 62 meters build in 1962. It is the largest stone arch bridge in Xinjiang

The frost period in Tashidian lasts on average 187 days per year.

Tashidian was made a part of Korla in 1979 and was given the status of town in March 2001. Around the same time, it had a population of about 20,000.

== See also ==
- List of township-level divisions of Xinjiang
