= Kashgar =

County-level city in Xinjiang, China

Kashgar: قەشقەر (Uyghur); 喀什 (Chinese); Kashi
- County-level city
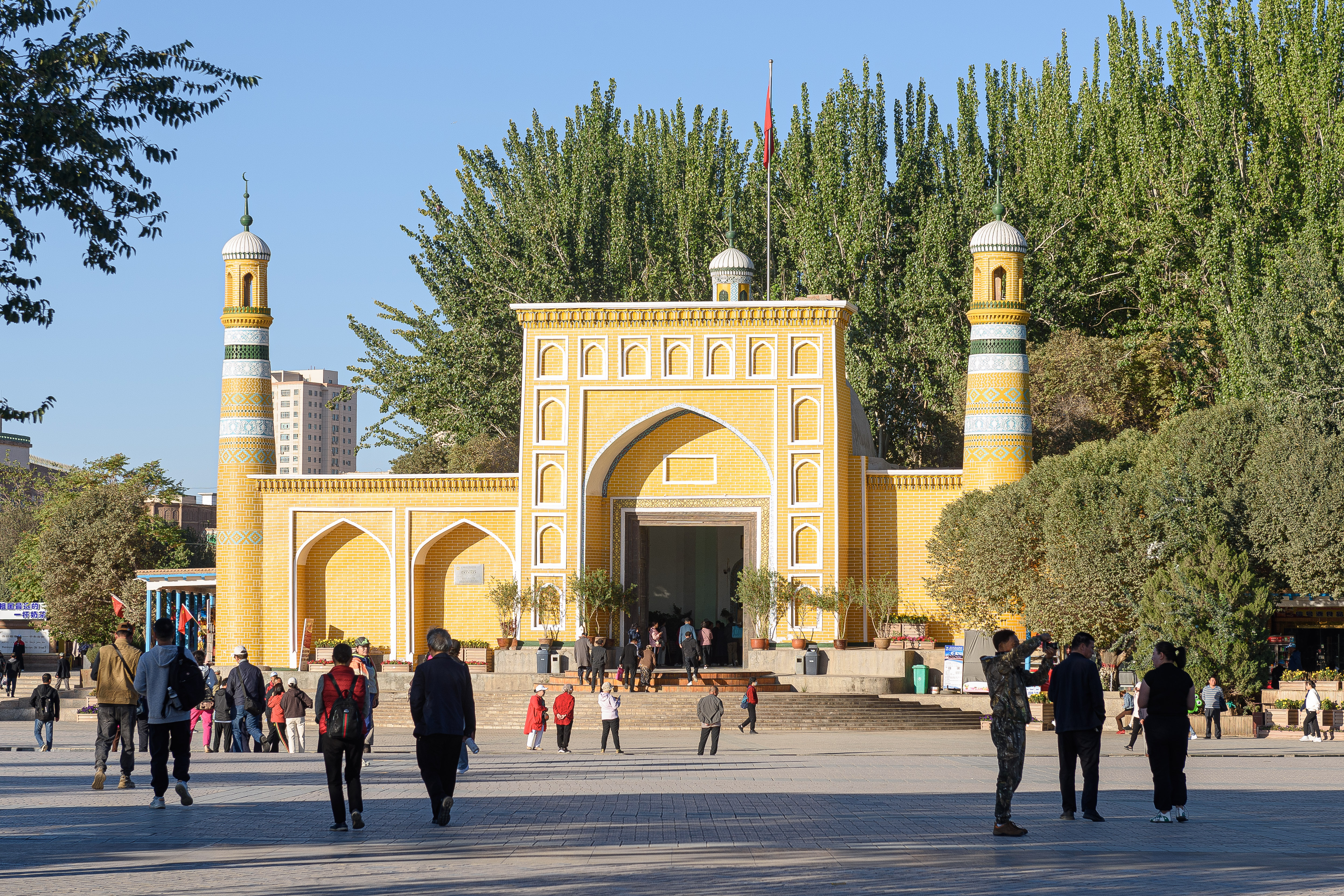
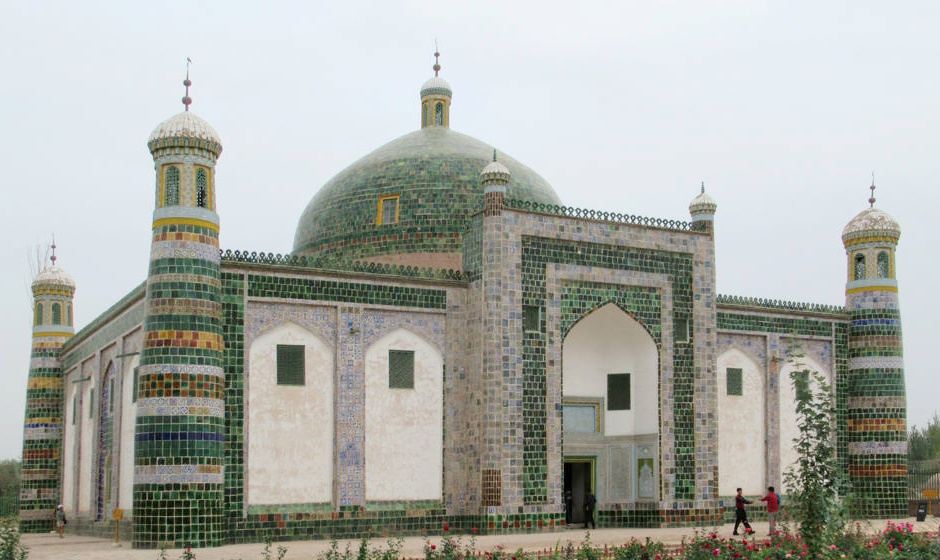
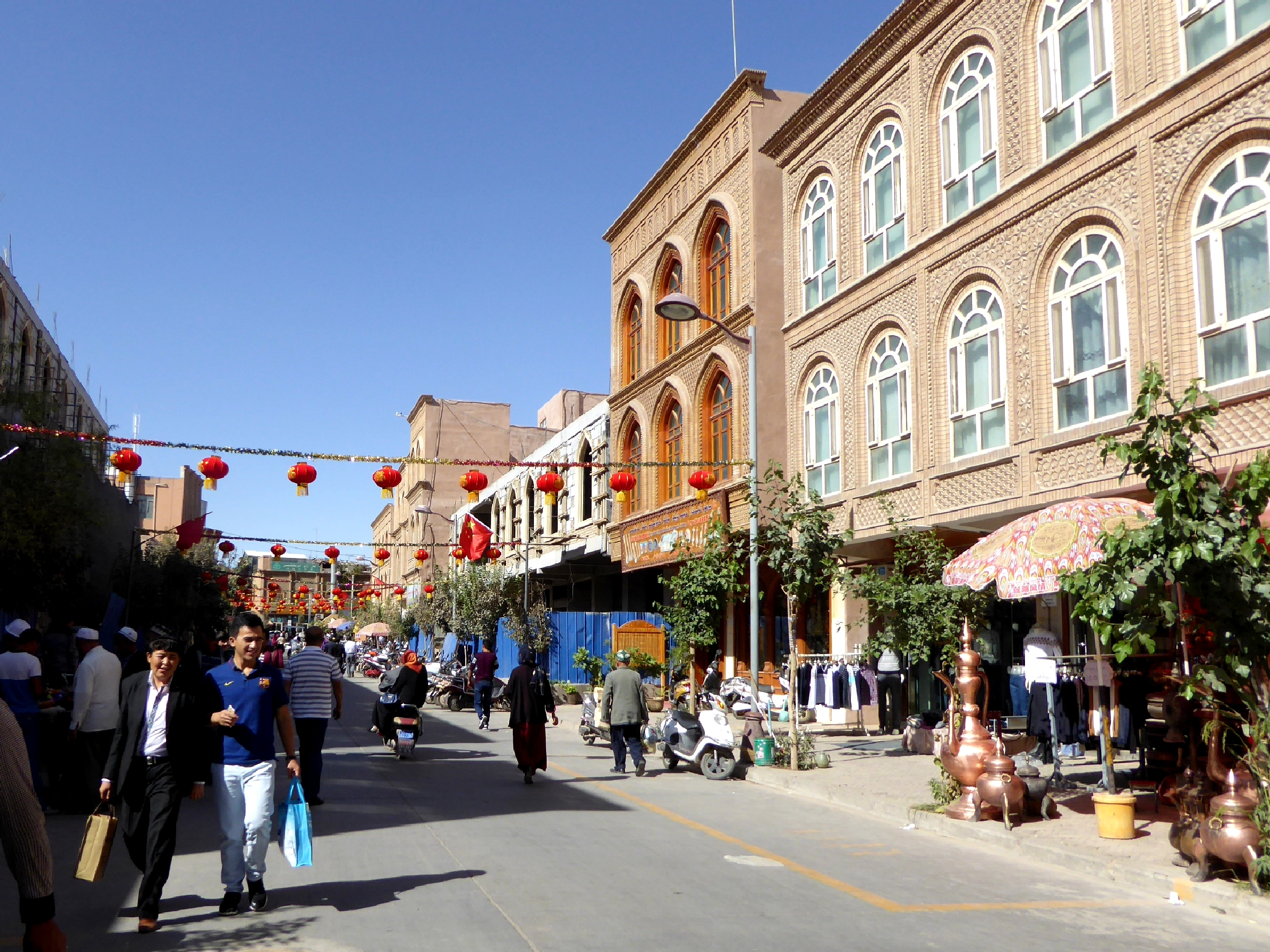
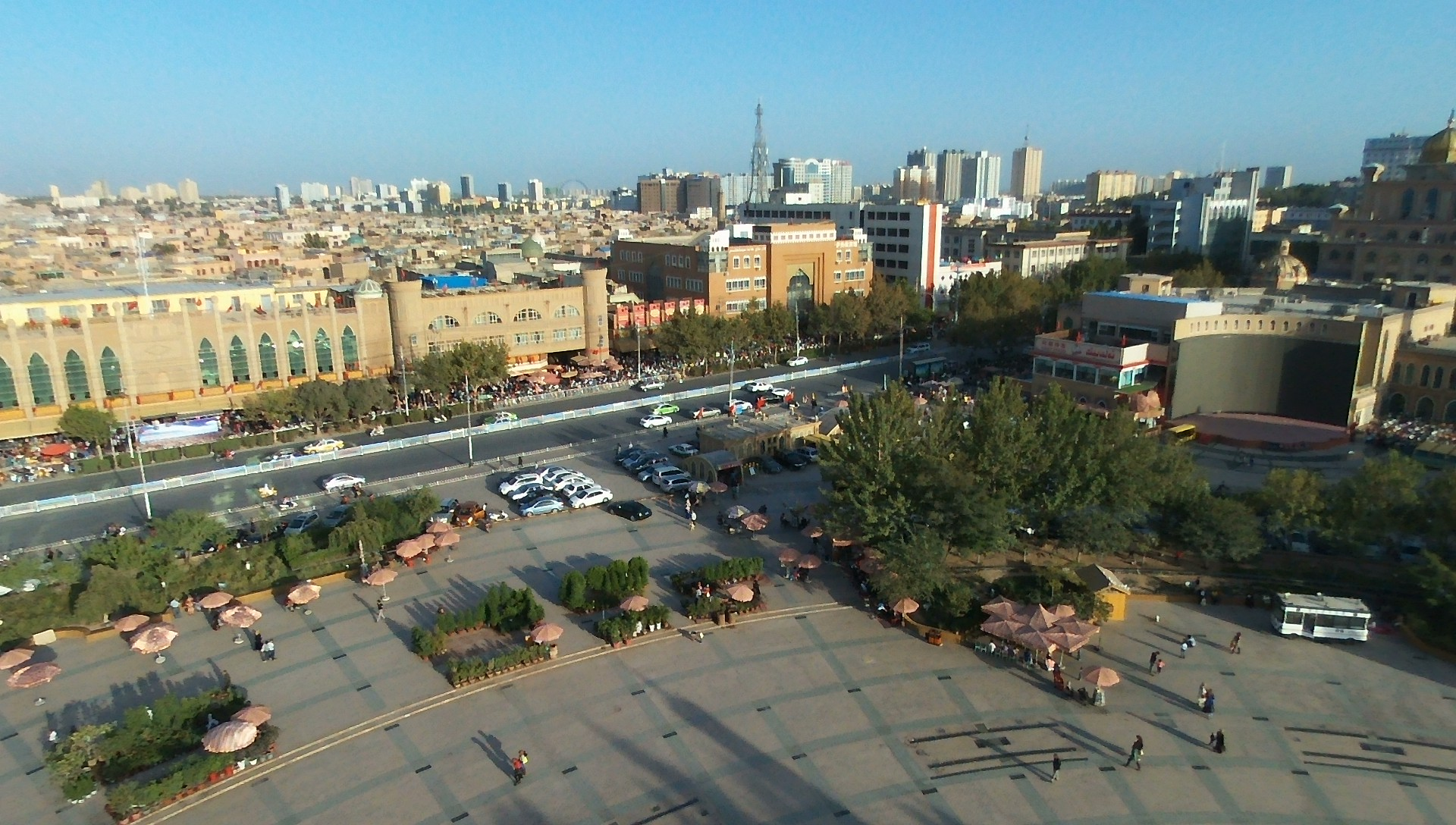
- Id Kah Mosque Afaq Khoja Mausoleum Kashgar Old City Skyline of Kashgar

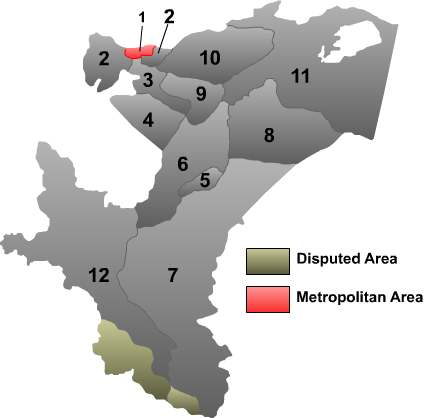
- Location of Kashgar (red) within Kashgar Prefecture

- Location of Kashgar's city centre in Xinjiang Kashgar (China)
- Coordinates (Kashgar municipal government): 39°28′05″N 75°59′38″E
- Country: China
- Autonomous region: Xinjiang
- Prefecture: Kashgar
- Municipal seat: Östeng Boyi Subdistrict

Area (2018)
  - County-level city: 1,056.8 km^{2} (408.0 sq mi)
  - Urban: 130 km^{2} (50 sq mi)
  - Metro: 2,818 km^{2} (1,088 sq mi)
- Elevation: 1,270 m (4,170 ft)

Population (2020)
  - County-level city: 782,662
  - Density: 740.60/km^{2} (1,918.1/sq mi)
  - Urban: 920,000
  - Urban density: 7,100/km^{2} (18,000/sq mi)

Demographics
  - Major ethnic groups: 85.8% Uyghurs; 13.5% Han Chinese
- Time zones: UTC+08:00 (CST)
- UTC+06:00 (XJT, de facto)
- Postal code: 844000
- Area code: 0998
- GDP (Nominal): 2019
  - Total: CN¥22.8 billion US$3.3 billion
  - Per capita: CN¥34,748; US$5,028
  - Growth: ▲6.2%
- Website: www.xjks.gov.cn

Kashgar
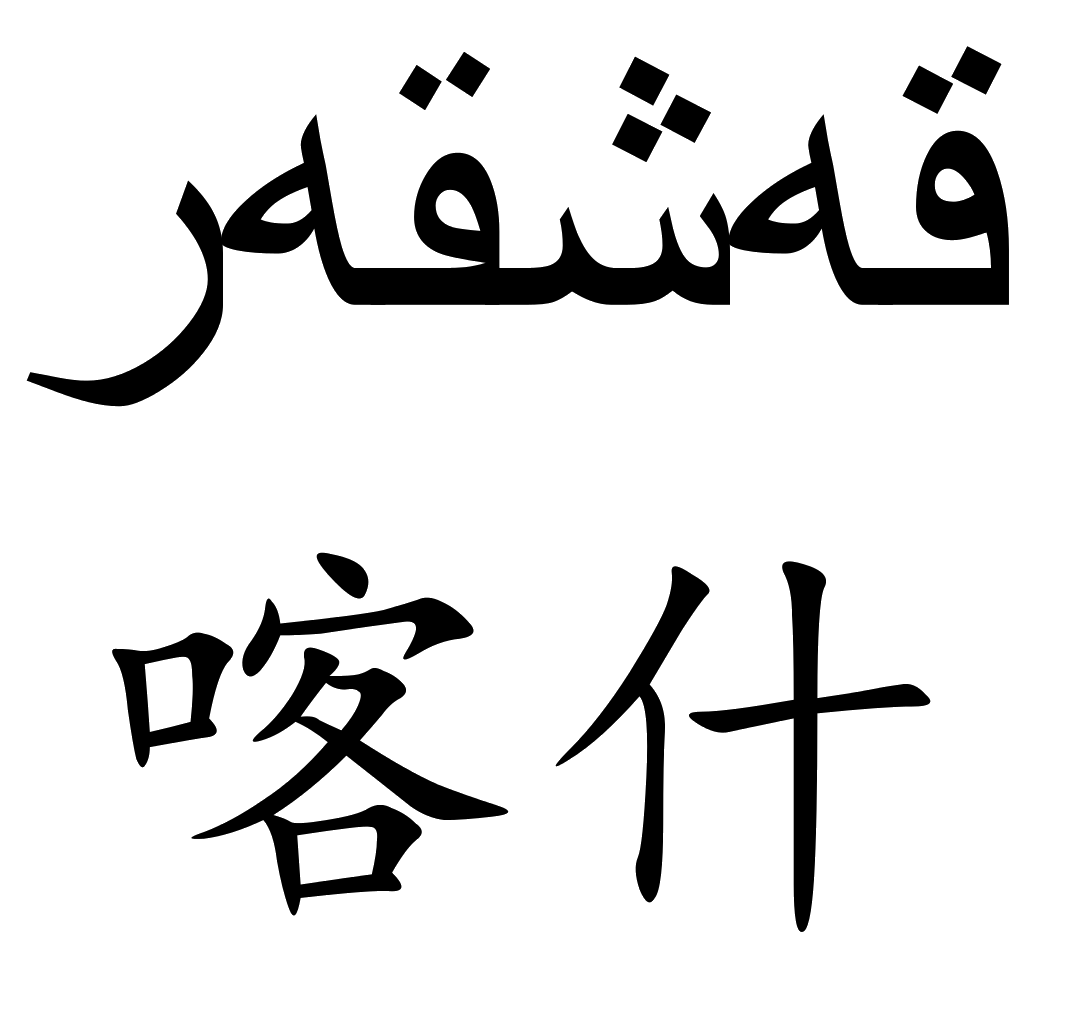
- "Kashgar" in Uyghur Arabic (top) and Chinese characters (bottom)

Uyghur name
- Uyghur: قەشقەر
Transcriptions
- Latin Yëziqi: Qeshqer
- Yengi Yeziⱪ: Ⱪǝxⱪǝr
- Siril Yëziqi: Қәшқәр
- Uyghur IPA: [qʰæɕqʰǽɚ̯]

Chinese name
- Chinese: 喀什
- Hanyu Pinyin: Kāshí
Transcriptions
Standard Mandarin
- Hanyu Pinyin: Kāshí
- Bopomofo: ㄎㄚ ㄕˊ
- Gwoyeu Romatzyh: Kashyr
- Wade–Giles: Kʻa^{1}-shih^{2}
- Tongyong Pinyin: Kashíh
- Yale Romanization: Kāshŕ
- MPS2: Kāshŕ
- IPA: [kʰá.ʂɻ̩̌]

Alternative Chinese name
- Simplified Chinese: 喀什噶尔
- Traditional Chinese: 喀什噶爾
- Hanyu Pinyin: PRC Standard Mandarin: Kāshígá'ěr; ROC Standard Mandarin: Kàshígé'ěr
Transcriptions
Standard Mandarin
- Hanyu Pinyin: PRC Standard Mandarin: Kāshígá'ěr; ROC Standard Mandarin: Kàshígé'ěr
- Bopomofo: PRC: ㄎㄚ ㄕˊ ㄍㄚˊ ㄦˇ; ROC: ㄎㄚˋ ㄕˊ ㄍㄜˊ ㄦˇ
- Gwoyeu Romatzyh: PRC: Kashyrgar'eel; ROC: Kahshyrger'eel
- Wade–Giles: PRC: Kʻa^{1}-shih^{2}-ka^{2}-êrh^{3} ROC: Kʻa^{4}-shih^{2}-ko^{2}-êrh^{3}
- Tongyong Pinyin: PRC: Kashíhgá'ěr; ROC: Kàshíhgé'ěr
- Yale Romanization: PRC: Kāshŕgáěr; ROC: Kàshŕgéěr
- MPS2: PRC: Kāshŕgáěr; ROC: Kàshŕgéěr
- IPA: PRC: [kʰá.ʂɻ̩̌.kǎ.àɚ] ROC: [kʰâ.ʂɻ̩̌.kɤ̌.àɚ]

Historical Chinese name
- Chinese: 疏勒
- Hanyu Pinyin: Shūlè
Transcriptions
Standard Mandarin
- Hanyu Pinyin: Shūlè
- Bopomofo: ㄕㄨ ㄌㄜˋ
- Gwoyeu Romatzyh: Shuleh
- Wade–Giles: Shu^{1}-lê^{4}
- Tongyong Pinyin: Shulè
- Yale Romanization: Shūlè
- MPS2: Shūlè
- IPA: [ʂú.lɤ̂]

Second historical Chinese name
- Chinese: 疏附
- Hanyu Pinyin: Shūfù
Transcriptions
Standard Mandarin
- Hanyu Pinyin: Shūfù
- Bopomofo: ㄕㄨ ㄈㄨˋ
- Gwoyeu Romatzyh: Shufuh
- Wade–Giles: Shu^{1}-fu^{4}
- Tongyong Pinyin: Shufù
- Yale Romanization: Shūfù
- MPS2: Shūfù
- IPA: [ʂú.fû]

Kashgar (Uyghur: قەشقەر, romanised: Qeshqer), also known as Kashi (Chinese: 喀什; pinyin: Kāshí), is a city in the Tarim Basin region of southern Xinjiang, China. It is one of the westernmost cities of China, located near the country's border with Kyrgyzstan and Tajikistan.

For over 2,000 years, Kashgar has been a strategically important oasis on the Silk Road linking China with Central Asia, the Middle East, and Europe. It is one of the oldest continuously inhabited cities in the world and has a population of 711,300 people (as of 2019). Kashgar's urban area covers 15 km^{2} (5.8 sq mi), although its administrative area extends over 555 km^{2} (214 sq mi).

At the convergence point of widely varying cultures and empires, Kashgar has been under the rule of the Chinese, Turkic, Mongol, and Tibetan empires. The city has also been the site of a number of battles between various groups of people on the steppes.

Now administered as a county-level city, Kashgar is the administrative centre of Kashgar Prefecture, which has an area of 162,000 km^{2} (63,000 sq mi) and a population of approximately 4 million as of 2010. Kashgar was declared a Special Economic Zone in 2010; it is the only city in western China with this designation. Kashgar also forms a terminus of the Karakoram Highway, the reconstruction of which is considered a major part of the multibillion-dollar China–Pakistan Economic Corridor.

== Etymology ==
The earliest recorded names of the city are Shufu (疏附) and Shule (疏勒). Shufu originally referred to Kashgar's old city inhabited by the Uyghurs, while Shule referred to the new city built by Han Chinese settlers, located 6 miles (9.7 km) from the old one. The origin of the name Kashgar is not known for certain and is the subject of academic debate. In his work Geography, the Roman geographer Ptolemy (90–168) refers to the city as Kasi. The Buddhist scholar Xuanzang meanwhile recorded the name Kasha after passing through the city in 644. The name Kashgar did not appear in Chinese records (as 喀什噶爾; Kàshígé'ěr) until the Song dynasty (960–1279), but it was likely to have been used orally long before then.

British archaeologist Aurel Stein (1862–1943) argued that the name Kashgar came into use in 716, sometime after the raids on the city by Qutayba ibn Muslim, the then Arab governor of Khurasan. However, Stein's contemporary, the Scottish historian H. A. R. Gibb (1895–1971), argued that Qutayba never made it as far as Kashgar, and Stein was likely conflating Kashgar with another city. H. W. Bailey (1899–1996), an English scholar who specialised in the Iranian languages, proposed that the Persian name Kâš (کاش) may have been the indigenous name of the city, with the Eastern Iranian suffix -ğar (غر, lit. 'mountain') being attached later on. Mallory and Mair, known for their controversial theories on the Tarim Mummies, have suggested that Shule was an inadequent attempt by the Chinese to transcribe an originally Sanskrit name for Kashgar, Śrīkrīrāti (lit. 'fortunate hospitality').

Archaic English spellings of Kashgar include Cascar and Cashgar. The modern Chinese name Kashi (喀什) is a shortened form of the longer and less-frequently used Kashiga'er (喀什噶尔). The Chinese government's official spelling for Kashgar in the Uyghur language is Qeshqer (قەشقەر), but the historical spelling Kashgher (كاشغەر) is still used by some Uyghurs today.

== History ==
Kashgar is located at the convergence point of widely varying cultures and empires, it has been under the rule of the historically Chinese, Turkic, Mongol, and Tibetan empires. The city has also been the site of a number of battles between various groups of people on the steppes.

=== Han dynasty ===
The earliest mention of Kashgar occurs when a Chinese Han dynasty envoy travelled the Northern Silk Road to explore lands to the west.

Another early mention of Kashgar is during the Former Han (also known as the Western Han dynasty), when in 76 BC the Chinese conquered the Xiongnu, Yutian (Khotan), Sulei (Kashgar) and a group of states in the Tarim Basin almost up to the foot of the Tian Shan range.

Ptolemy speaks of Scythia beyond the Imaus, which is in a "Kasia Regio", probably exhibiting the name from which Kashgar and Kashgaria (often applied to the district) are formed. The country's people practised Zoroastrianism and Buddhism before the coming of Islam.

In the Book of Han, which covers the period between 125 BC and 23 AD, it is recorded that there were 1,510 households, 18,647 people and 2,000 persons able to bear arms. By the time covered by the Book of the Later Han (roughly 25 to 170 AD), it had grown to 21,000 households and had 3,000 men able to bear arms.

History of Kashgar
Year	City Name	Dynasty	Notes
≈ 2nd cent. BC	Shule	Shule Kingdom	(Note: Capital of the Shule Kingdom.)
≈ 177 BC	Shule	Xiongnu	
60 BC	Shule	Western Han dynasty	(Note: During the Eastern Han dynasty, Shule was administered by the Protectorate of the Western Regions.)
1st cent. AD	Shule	Xiongnu, Yuezhi	
74	Shule	Eastern Han dynasty	
107	Shule	Northern Xiongnu	
127	Shule	Eastern Han dynasty	
150	Shule	Kushan	
323	Shule	Kucha, Rouran	
384	Shule	Former Qin	
≈450	Shule	Hephthalite Empire	
492	Shule	Gaoche	
≈504	Shule	Hephthalite Empire	
≈552	Shule	First Turkic Khaganate,	
≈583	Shule	Western Turkic Khanate,	
648	Shule	Tang dynasty	
651	Shule	Western Turkic Khanate,	
658	Shule	Tang dynasty	
670	Shule	Tibetan Empire	
679	Shule	Tang dynasty	
686	Shule	Tibetan Empire	
692	Shule	Tang dynasty	
790	Shule	Tibetan Empire	
791	Shule	Uyghur Khaganate	
840	Kashgar	Karakhanid Khanate	
893	Kashgar	Karakhanid Khanate	
1041	Kashgar	Eastern Karakhanid	
1134	Kashgar	Karakhitai Khanate (Western Liao dynasty)	
1215	Kashgar	Karakhitai Khanate (Western Liao dynasty)	
1218	Kashgar	Mongol Empire	
1266	Kashgar	Chagatai Khanate	
1348	Kashgar	Moghulistan (Eastern Chagatay)	
1387	Kashgar	Moghulistan (Eastern Chagatay)	
1392	Kashgar	Timurid dynasty	
1432	Kashgar	Chagatay	
1466	Kashgar	Dughlats	
1514	Kashgar	Yarkent Khanate	
1697	Kashgar	Dzungar Khanate	
1759	Kashgar	Qing dynasty	
1865	Kashgar	Emirate of Kashgaria	
1877	Kashgar	Qing dynasty	
1913	Kashgar	Republic of China	
1933	Kashgar	Turkic Islamic Republic of East Turkestan	
1934	Kashgar	Republic of China	
1949	Kashgar / Kashi	People's Republic of China	
Capital of an independent political entity

The Book of the Later Han provides a wealth of detail on developments in the region:

In the period of Emperor Wu [140–87 BC] of Han Dynasty, the Western Regions were under the control of the Interior [China]. They numbered thirty-six kingdoms. The Imperial Government established a Colonel [in charge of] Envoys there to direct and protect these states. Emperor Xuan [73–49 BC] of Han Dynasty changed this title [in 59 BC] to Protector-General.

Emperor Yuan [40–33 BC] of Han Dynasty installed two Wuji Colonels to take charge of the agricultural garrisons on the frontiers of the king of Nearer Jushi [Turpan].

During the time of Emperor Ai [6 BC – 1 AD] and Emperor Ping [1 – 5 AD], the principalities of the Western Regions split up and formed fifty-five kingdoms. Wang Mang, after he usurped the Throne [in 9 AD], demoted and changed their kings and marquises. Following this, the Western Regions became resentful and rebelled. They, therefore, broke off all relations with the Interior [China] and, all together, submitted to the Xiongnu again.

The Xiongnu collected oppressively heavy taxes and the kingdoms were not able to support their demands. In the middle of the Jianwu period [AD 25–56], they each [Shanshan and Yarkand in 38 and 18 kingdoms in 45], sent envoys to ask if they could submit to the Interior [China] and to express their desire for a Protector-General. Emperor Guangwu, decided that because the Empire was not yet settled [after a long period of civil war], he had no time for outside affairs and [therefore] finally refused his consent [in 45 AD].

In the meantime, the Xiongnu became weaker. The king of Suoju [Yarkand], named Xian, wiped out several kingdoms. After Xian's death [c. 62 AD], they began to attack and fight each other. Xiao Yuan [Tura], Jingjue [Cadota], Ronglu [Niya] and Qiemo [Cherchen] were annexed by Shanshan [the Lop Nur region]. Qule [south of Keriya] and Pishan [modern Pishan or Guma] were conquered and fully occupied by Yutian [Khotan]. Yuli [Fukang], Danhuan, Guhu [Dawan Cheng] and Wutanzili were destroyed by Jushi [Turpan and Jimasa]; said kingdoms were subsequently reestablished in later years.

During the Yongping period [58 – 75 AD], the Northern Xiongnu forced several countries to help them plunder the commanderies and districts of Hexi. The gates of the towns stayed shut in broad daylight."

More particularly, in reference to Kashgar itself, is the following record:

In the sixteenth Yongping year of Emperor Ming 73, Jian, the king of Qiuci (Kucha), attacked and killed Cheng, the king of Shule (Kashgar). Then he appointed the Qiuci (Kucha) Marquis of the Left, Douti, King of Shule (Kashgar). In winter 73 AD, the Han sent the Major Ban Chao who captured and bound Douti. He appointed Zhong, the son of the elder brother of Cheng, to be king of Shule (Kashgar). Zhong later rebelled. (Ban) Chao attacked and beheaded him.

=== The Kushans ===
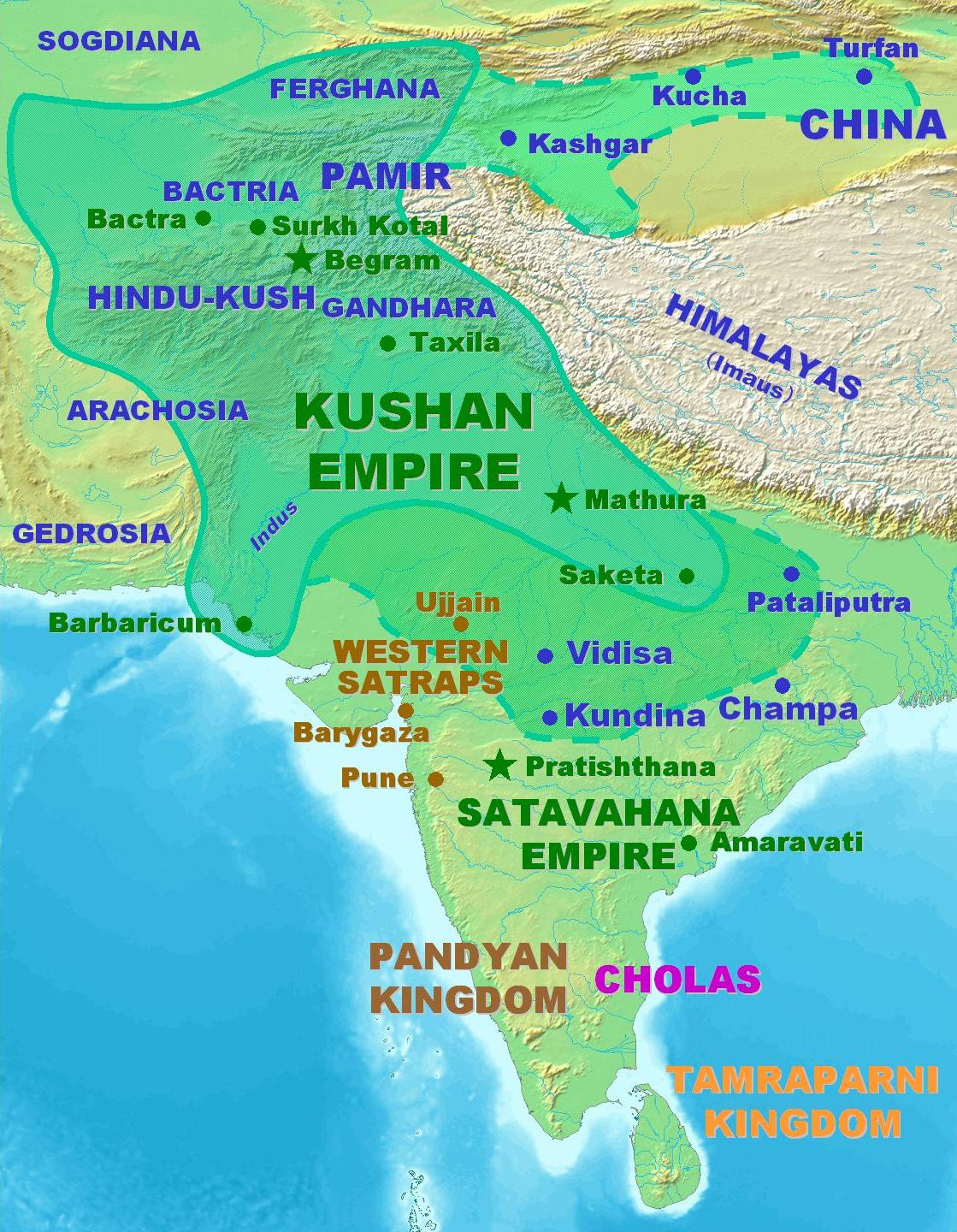
Kashgar in the Kushan Empire under Kanishka the Great

The Book of the Later Han also gives the only extant historical record of Yuezhi or Kushan involvement in the Kashgar oasis:

During the Yuanchu period (114–120) in the reign of Emperor, the king of Shule (Kashgar), exiled his maternal uncle Chenpan to the Yuezhi (Kushans) for some offense. The king of the Yuezhi became very fond of him. Later, Anguo died without leaving a son. His mother directed the government of the kingdom. She agreed with the people of the country to put Yifu (lit. "posthumous child"), who was the son of a full younger brother of Chenpan on the throne as king of Shule (Kashgar). Chenpan heard of this and appealed to the Yuezhi (Kushan) king, saying: "Anguo had no son. His relative (Yifu) is weak. If one wants to put on the throne a member of (Anguo's) mother's family, I am Yifu's paternal uncle, it is I who should be king."

The Yuezhi (Kushans) then sent soldiers to escort him back to Shule (Kashgar). The people had previously respected and been fond of Chenpan. Besides, they dreaded the Yuezhi (Kushans). They immediately took the seal and ribbon from Yifu and went to Chenpan, and made him king. Yifu was given the title of Marquis of the town of Pangao [90 li, or 37 km, from Shule].

Then Suoju (Yarkand) continued to resist Yutian (Khotan), and put themselves under Shule (Kashgar). Thus Shule (Kashgar), became powerful and a rival to Qiuci (Kucha) and Yutian (Khotan)."

However, it was not very long before the Chinese began to reassert their authority in the region:

In the second Yongjian year (127), during Emperor Shun's reign, Chenpan sent an envoy to respectfully present offerings. The Emperor bestowed on Chenpan the title of Great Commandant-in-Chief for the Han. Chenxun, who was the son of his elder brother, was appointed Temporary Major of the Kingdom. In the fifth year (130), Chenpan sent his son to serve the Emperor and, along with envoys from Dayuan (Ferghana) and Suoju (Yarkand), brought tribute and offerings.

From an earlier part of the same text comes the following addition:

In the first Yangjia year (132), Xu You sent the king of Shule (Kashgar), Chenpan, who with 20,000 men, attacked and defeated Yutian (Khotan). He beheaded several hundred people, and released his soldiers to plunder freely. He replaced the king [of Jumi] by installing Chengguo from the family of [the previous king] Xing, and then he returned.

The first passage continues:

In the second Yangjia year (133), Chenpan again made offerings (including) a lion and zebu cattle.

Then, during Emperor Ling's reign, in the first Jianning year [168], the king of Shule (Kashgar) and Commandant-in-Chief for the Han (i.e. presumably Chenpan), was killed while hunting by the youngest of his paternal uncles, Hede. Hede named himself king.

In the third year (170), Meng Tuo, the Inspector of Liangzhou, sent the Provincial Officer Ren She, commanding five hundred soldiers from Dunhuang, with the Wuji Major Cao Kuan, and Chief Clerk of the Western Regions, Zhang Yan, brought troops from Yanqi (Karashahr), Qiuci (Kucha), and the Nearer and Further States of Jushi (Turpan and Jimasa), altogether numbering more than 30,000, to punish Shule (Kashgar). They attacked the town of Zhenzhong [Arach − near Maralbashi] but, having stayed for more than forty days without being able to subdue it, they withdrew. Following this, the kings of Shule (Kashgar) killed one another repeatedly while the Imperial Government was unable to prevent it.

=== Three Kingdoms to the Sui dynasty ===
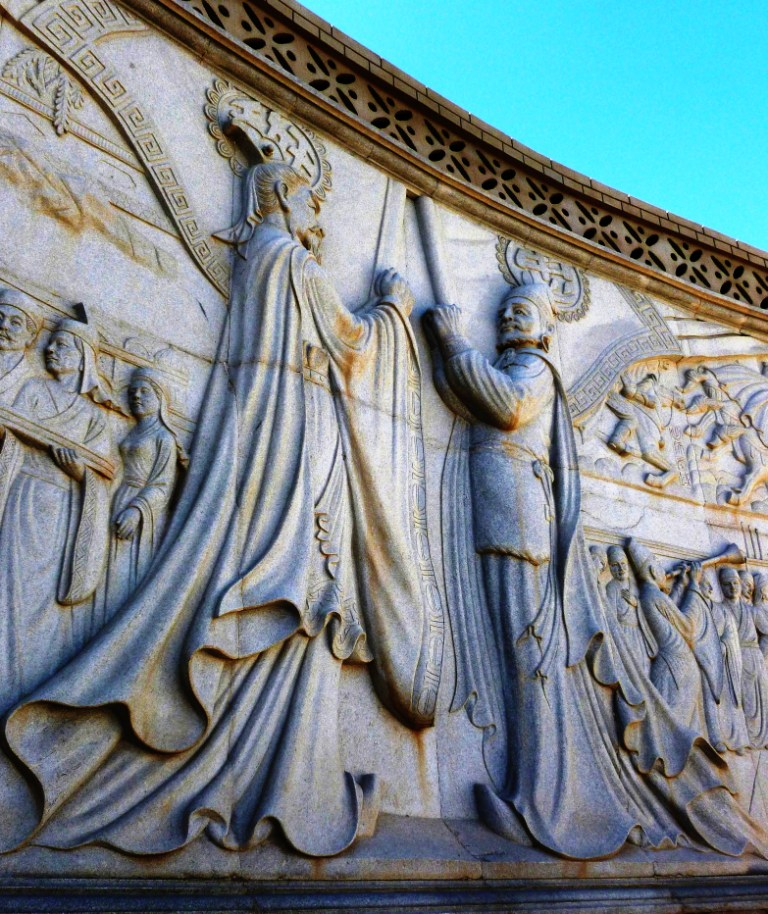
Relief with Ban Chao and King Yule (Zhong) of Kashgar in 73 AD

These centuries are marked by a general silence in sources on Kashgar and the Tarim Basin.

The Weilüe, composed in the second third of the 3rd century, mentions a number of states as dependencies of Kashgar: the kingdom of Zhenzhong (Arach?), the kingdom of Suoju (Yarkand), the kingdom of Jieshi, the kingdom of Qusha, the kingdom of Xiye (Khargalik), the kingdom of Yinai (Tashkurghan), the kingdom of Manli (modern Karasul), the kingdom of Yire (Mazar − also known as Tágh Nák and Tokanak), the kingdom of Yuling, the kingdom of Juandu ('Tax Control' − near modern Irkeshtam), the kingdom of Xiuxiu ('Excellent Rest Stop' − near Karakavak), and the kingdom of Qin.

However, much of the information on the Western Regions contained in the Weilüe seems to have ended roughly about (170), near the end of Han power. It is not confirmed whether this is a reference to the state of affairs during the Cao Wei (220–265), or whether it refers to the situation before the civil war during the Later Han when China lost touch with most foreign countries and came to be divided into three separate kingdoms.

Chapter 30 of the Records of the Three Kingdoms says that after the beginning of the Wei Dynasty (220) the states of the Western Regions did not arrive as before, except for the larger ones such as Kucha, Khotan, Kangju, Wusun, Kashgar, Yuezhi, Shanshan and Turpan, who are said to have come to present tribute every year, as in Han times.

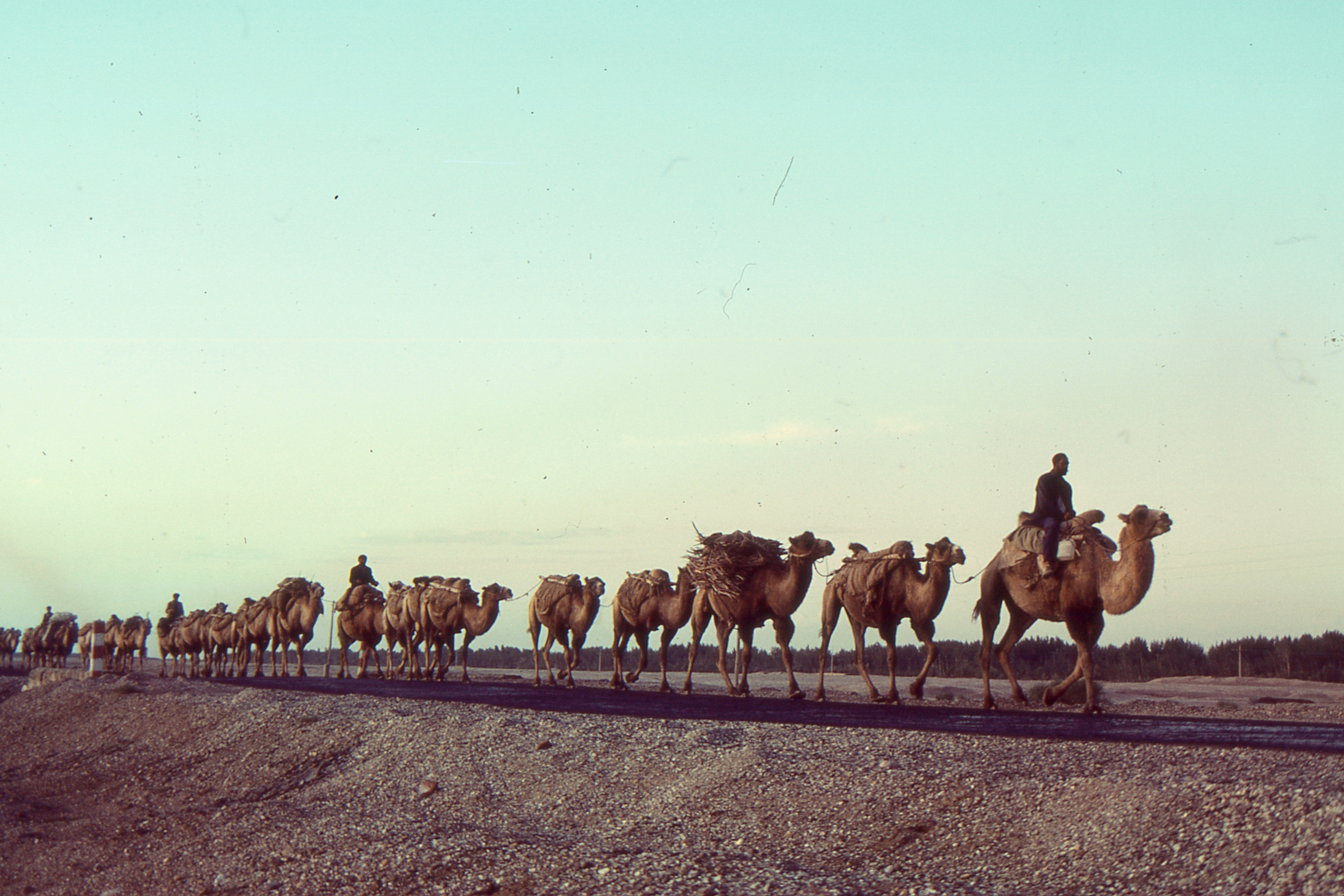
Camels traversing the old Silk Road in 1992

In 270, four states from the Western Regions were said to have presented tribute: Karashahr, Turpan, Shanshan, and Kucha. Some wooden documents from Niya seem to indicate that contacts were also maintained with Kashgar and Khotan around this time.

In 422, according to the Songshu, ch. 98, the king of Shanshan, Bilong, came to the court and "the thirty-six states in the Western Regions" all swore their allegiance and presented tribute. It must be assumed that these 36 states included Kashgar.

The "Songji" of the Zizhi Tongjian records that in the 5th month of 435, nine states: Kucha, Kashgar, Wusun, Yueban, Tashkurghan, Shanshan, Karashahr, Turpan and Sute all came to the Wei court.

In 439, Shanshan, Kashgar and Karashahr sent envoys to present tribute.

The kingdoms of Kucha, Kashgar, Wusun, Yueban, Tashkurghan, Shanshan, Karashahr, Turpan and Sute all began sending envoys to present tribute in the Taiyuan reign period (435–440).

In 453 Kashgar sent envoys to present tribute, and again in 455.

An embassy sent during the reign of Wencheng Di (452–466) from the king of Kashgar presented a supposed sacred relic of the Buddha; a dress which was incombustible.

In 507, Kashgar sent envoys in both the 9th and 10th months.

In 512, Kashgar sent envoys in the 1st and 5th months.

Early in the 6th century Kashgar is included among the many territories controlled by the Yeda or Hephthalite Huns, but their empire collapsed at the onslaught of the Western Turks between 563 and 567 who then probably gained control over Kashgar and most of the states in the Tarim Basin.

=== Tang dynasty ===
The founding of the Tang dynasty in 618 saw the beginning of a prolonged struggle between China and the Western Turks for control of the Tarim Basin. In 635, the Tang Annals reported an emissary from the king of Kashgar to the Tang capital. In 639 there was a second emissary bringing products of Kashgar as a token of submission to the Tang state.

Buddhist scholar Xuanzang passed through Kashgar (which he referred to as Kasha) in 644 on his return journey from India to China. The Buddhist religion, then beginning to decay in India, was active in Kashgar. Xuanzang recorded that they flattened their babies heads, tattooed their bodies and had green eyes. He reported that Kashgar had abundant crops, fruits and flowers, wove fine woolen stuffs and rugs. Their writing system had been adapted from Indian script but their language was different from that of other countries. The inhabitants were sincere Buddhist adherents and there were some hundreds of monasteries with more than 10,000 followers, all members of the Sarvastivadin School.

At around the same era, Nestorian Christians were establishing bishoprics at Herat, Merv and Samarkand, whence they subsequently proceeded to Kashgar, and finally to China proper itself.

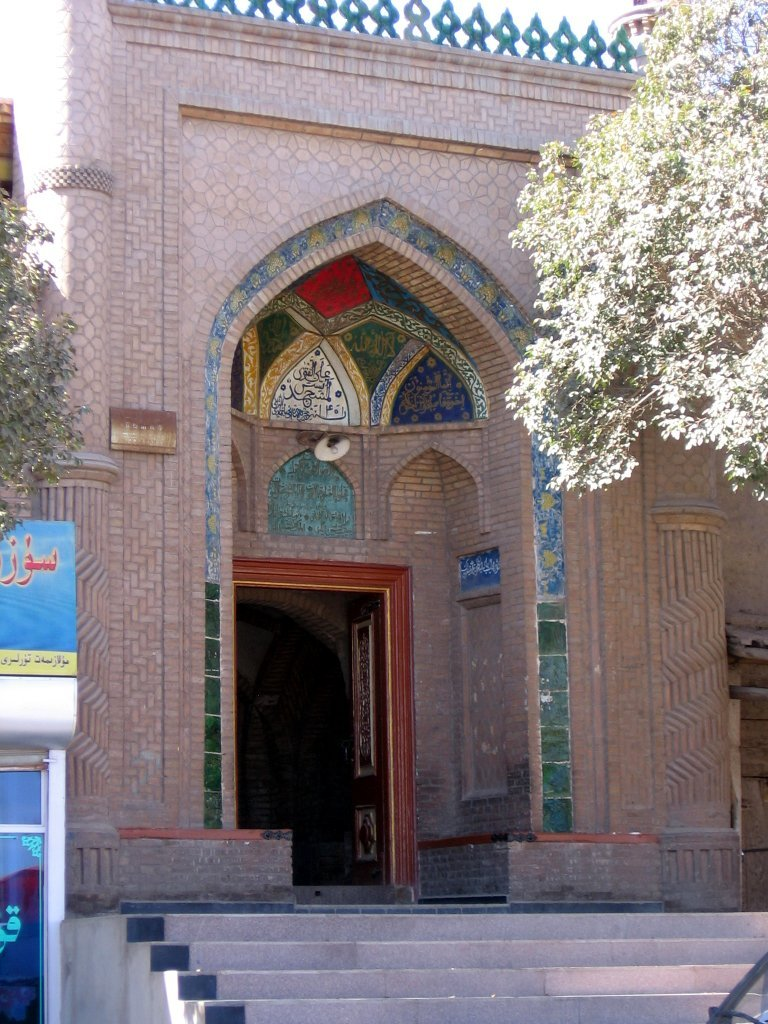
Mosque entrance in Kashgar Old City

In 646, the Turkic Kagan asked for the hand of a Tang Chinese princess, and in return the Emperor promised Kucha, Khotan, Kashgar, Karashahr and Sarikol as a marriage gift, but this did not happen as planned.

In a series of campaigns between 652 and 658, with the help of the Uyghurs, the Chinese finally defeated the Western Turk tribes and took control of all their domains, including the Tarim Basin kingdoms. Karakhoja was annexed in 640, Karashahr during campaigns in 644 and 648, and Kucha fell in 648.

In 662 a rebellion broke out in the Western Regions and a Chinese army sent to control it was defeated by the Tibetans south of Kashgar.

After another defeat of the Tang Chinese forces in 670, the Tibetans gained control of the whole region and completely subjugated Kashgar in 676-8 and retained possession of it until 692, when the Tang dynasty regained control of all their former territories, and retained it for the next fifty years.

In 722 Kashgar sent 4,000 troops to assist the Chinese to force the "Tibetans out of "Little Bolu" or Gilgit.

In 728, the king of Kashgar was awarded a brevet by the Chinese emperor.

In 739, the Tangshu relates that the governor of the Chinese garrison in Kashgar, with the help of Ferghana, was interfering in the affairs of the Turgesh tribes as far as Talas.

Soon after the Chinese pilgrim monk Wukong passed through Kashgar in 753. He again reached Kashgar on his return trip from India in 786 and mentions a Chinese deputy governor as well as the local king.

=== Battles with Arab Caliphate ===
In 711, the Arabs invaded Kashgar. It is alleged that Qutayba ibn Muslim in 712-715 had conquered Xinjiang. Although the Muslim religion from the very commencement sustained checks, it nevertheless made its weight felt upon the independent states of Turkestan to the north and east, and thus acquired a steadily growing influence. It was not, however, till the 10th century that Islam was established at Kashgar, under the Kara-Khanid Khanate.

The fall of Kashgar to Qutayba ibn Muslim is claimed as the start of Islam in the region by Mustafa Setmariam Nasar and by an article from Al-Qaeda branch Al-Nusra Front's English language "Al-Risalah magazine". (Note: (مجلة الرسالة), second issue (العدد الثاني), translated from English into Turkish by the "Doğu Türkistan Haber Ajansı" (East Turkestan News Agency) and titled Al Risale: "Türkistan Dağları" 1. Bölüm (The Message : "Turkistan Mountains" Part 2.))

In 717 the Arabs took Kashgar again, en route to besiege Uqturpan and Aksu, 400 km deeper into Chinese territory than Kashgar. Though they were defeated at the Battle of Aksu on August 15, 717. In 751 the Chinese were defeated by an Arab army in the Battle of Talas. The An Lushan Rebellion led to the decline of Tang influence in Central Asia due to the fact that the Tang dynasty was forced to withdraw its troops from the region to fight An Lushan. The Tibetans cut all communication between China and the West in 766.

=== Turkic rule ===
During the Samanid Empire (819-999) Kashgar was under a dehqan named Toghan Tigin, though it is unknown if he was a Muslim. In 922 a rebellious Samanid prince, Ilyas ibn Ishaq fled to Kashgar.

According to the 10th-century text Hudud al-'alam "the chiefs of Kashghar in the days of old were from the Qarluq, or from the Yaghma." The Karluks, Yaghmas and other tribes such as the Chigils formed the Karakhanids. The Karakhanid Sultan Satuq Bughra Khan converted to Islam in the 10th century and captured Kashgar. Kashgar was the capital of the Karakhanid state for a time but later the capital was moved to Balasaghun. During the latter part of the 10th century, the Muslim Karakhanids began a struggle against the Buddhist Kingdom of Khotan, and the Khotanese defeated the Karakhanids and captured Kashgar in 970. Chinese sources recorded the king of Khotan offering to send them a dancing elephant captured from Kashgar. Later in 1006, the Karakhanids of Kashgar under Yusuf Kadr Khan conquered Khotan.

The Karakhanid Khanate however was beset with internal strife, and the khanate split into two, the Eastern and Western Karakhanid Khanates, with Kashgar falling within the domain of the Eastern Karakhanid state. In 1089, the Western Karakhanids fell under the control of the Seljuks, but the Eastern Karakhanids was for the most part independent.

Both the Karakhanid states were defeated in the 12th century by the Kara-Khitans who captured Balasaghun, however Karakhanid rule continued in Kashgar under the suzerainty of the Kara-Khitans. The Kara-Khitan rulers followed a policy of religious tolerance, Islamic religious life continued uninterrupted and Kashgar was also a Nestorian metropolitan see. The last Karakhanid of Kashgar was killed in a revolt in 1211 by the city's notables. Kuchlug, a usurper of the throne of the Kara-Khitans, then attacked Kashgar which finally surrendered in 1214.

=== Mongol rule ===
The Kara-Khitai in their turn were swept away in 1219 by Genghis Khan. After his death, Kashgar came under the rule of the Chagatai Khans. Marco Polo visited the city, which he calls Cascar, about 1273-4 and recorded the presence of numerous Nestorian Christians, who had their own churches. Later In the 14th century, a Chagataid khan Tughluq Timur converted to Islam, and Islamic tradition began to reassert its ascendancy.

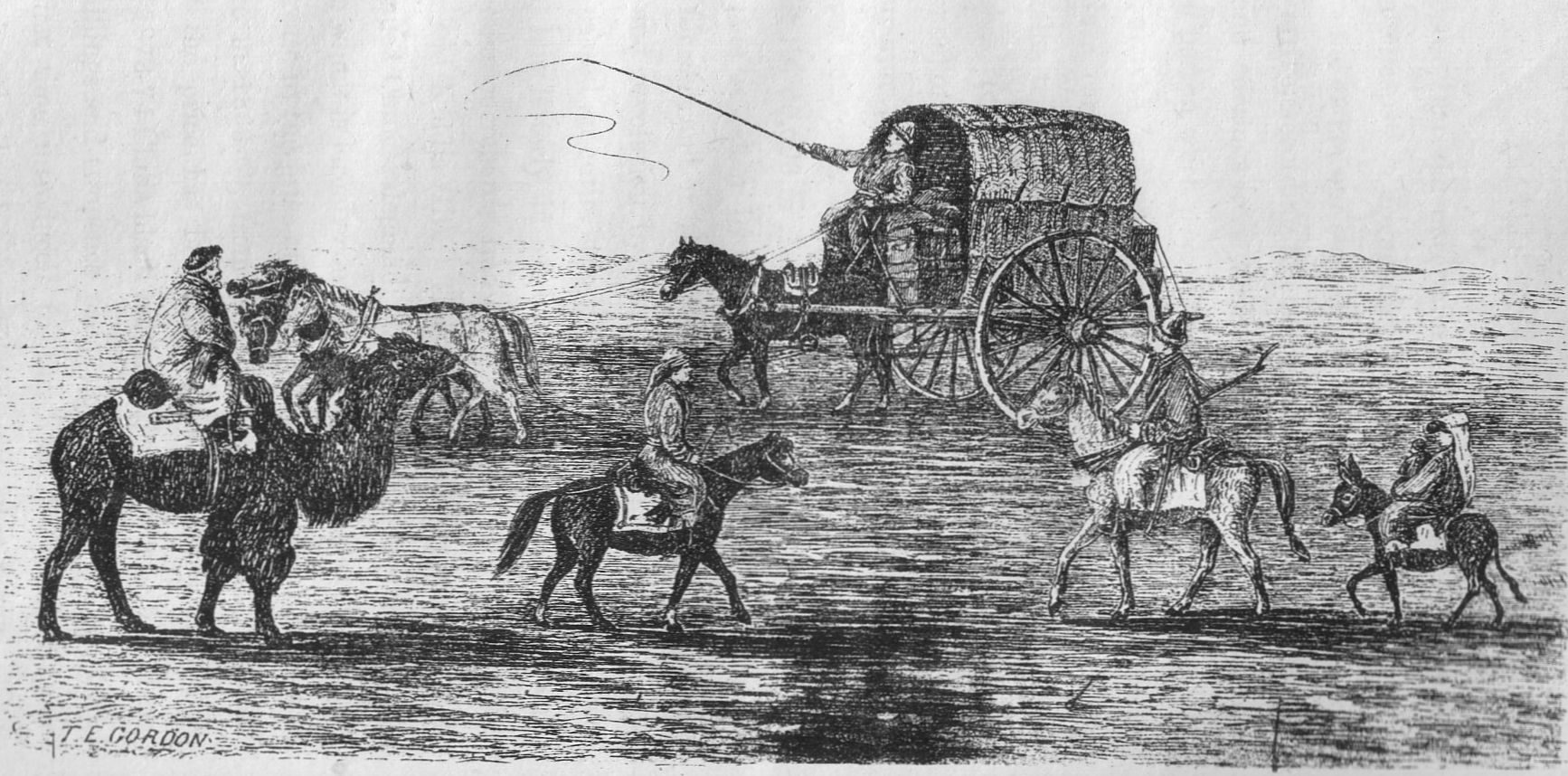
Kashgar road scene, 1870s

In 1389–1390 Tamerlane ravaged Kashgar, Andijan and the intervening country. Kashgar endured a troubled time, and in 1514, on the invasion of the Khan Sultan Said, was destroyed by Mirza Ababakar, who with the aid of ten thousand men built a new fort with massive defences higher up on the banks of the Tuman river. The dynasty of the Chagatai Khans collapsed in 1572 with the division of the country among rival factions; soon after, two powerful Khoja factions, the White and Black Mountaineers (Ak Taghliq or Afaqi, and Kara Taghliq or Ishaqi), arose whose differences and war-making gestures, with the intermittent episode of the Oirats of Dzungaria, make up much of recorded history in Kashgar until 1759. The Dzungar Khanate conquered Kashgar and set up the Khoja as their puppet rulers.

=== Qing conquest ===
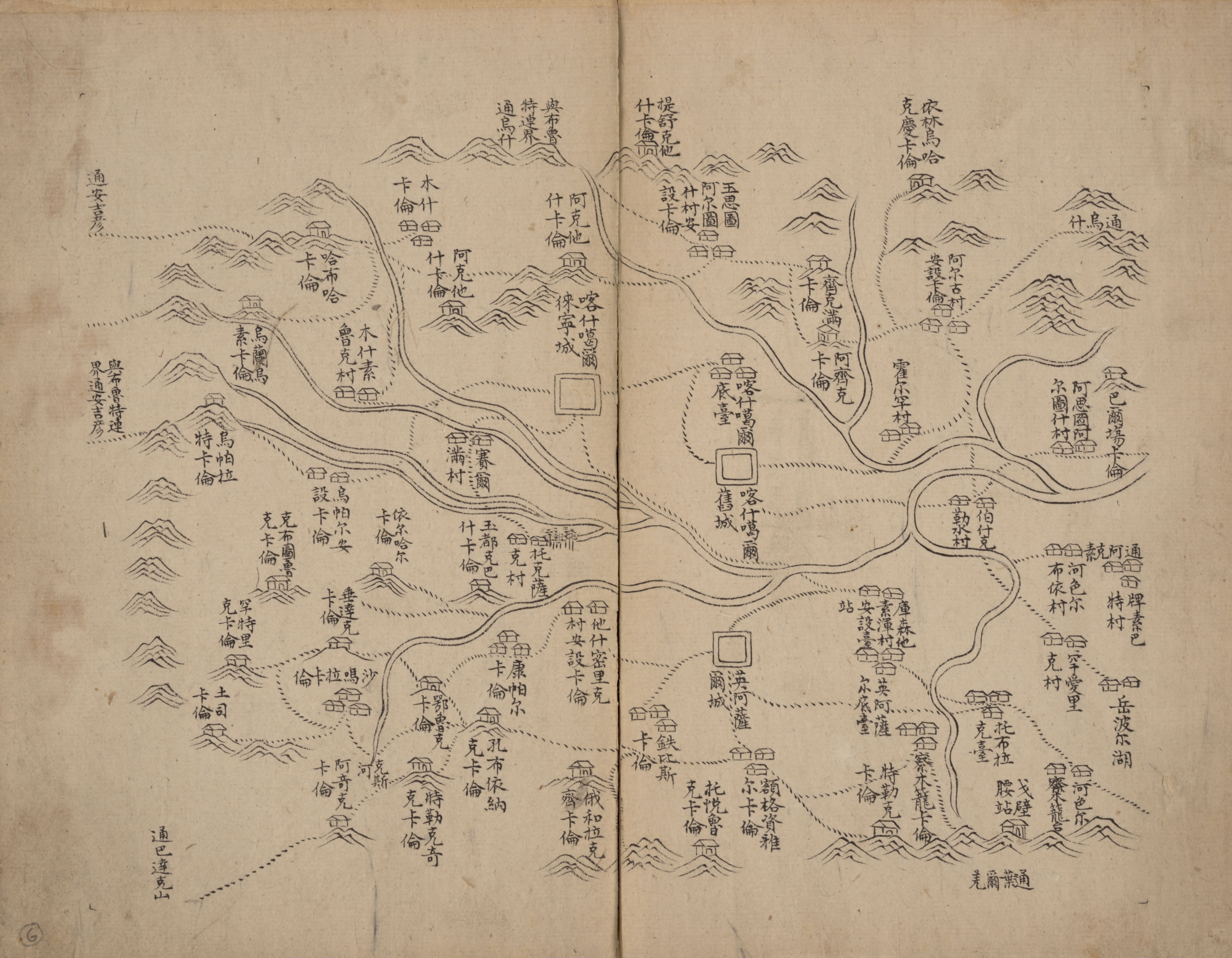
Kashgar, c. 1759

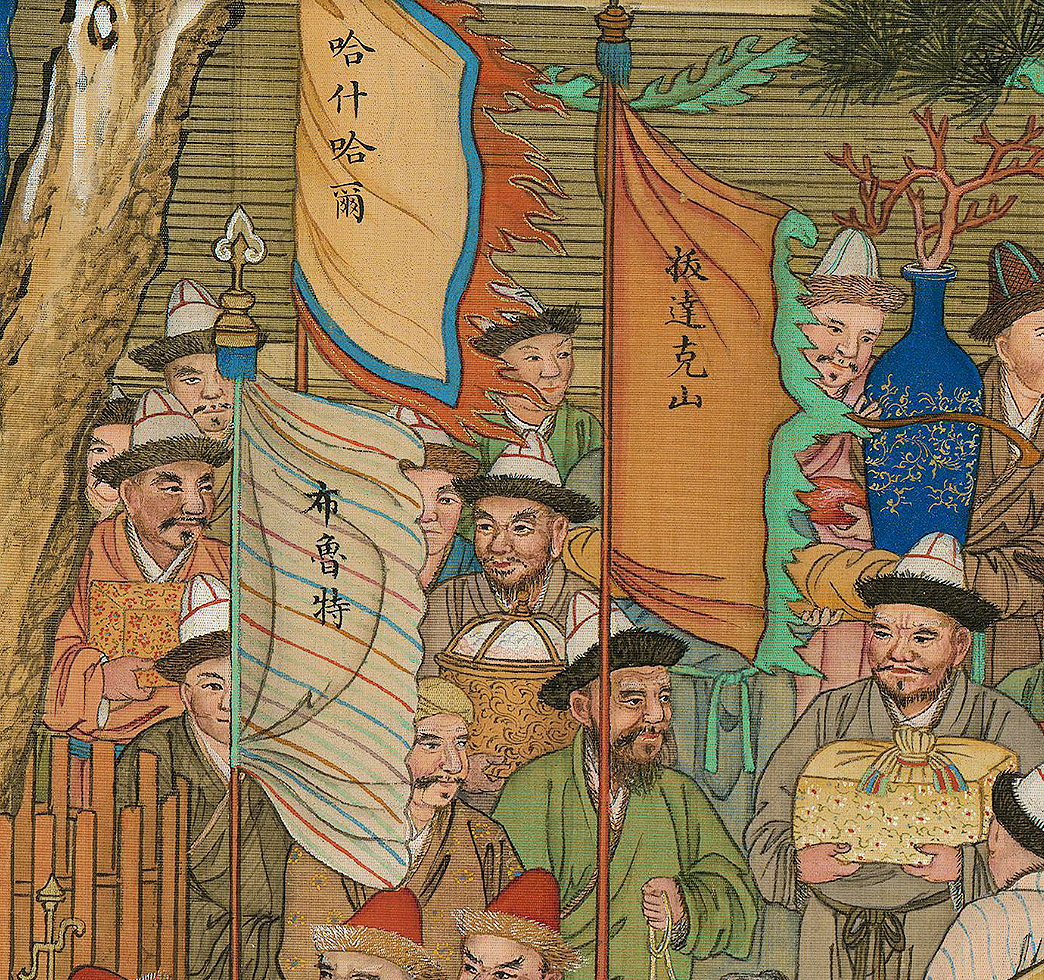
Kashgar (喀什喀爾) delegates in Peking (Beijing) in 1761. From Ten Thousand Nations Coming to Pay Tribute.

The Qing dynasty defeated the Dzungar Khanate during the Ten Great Campaigns and took control of Kashgar in 1759. The conquerors consolidated their authority by settling other ethnics emigrants in the vicinity of a Manchu garrison.

Rumours flew around Central Asia that the Qing planned to launch expeditions towards Transoxiana and Samarkand, the chiefs of which sought assistance from the Afghan king Ahmed Shah Abdali. The alleged expedition never happened so Ahmad Shah withdrew his forces from Kokand. He also dispatched an ambassador to Beijing to discuss the situation of the Afaqi Khojas, but the representative was not well received, and Ahmed Shah was too busy fighting off the Sikhs to attempt to enforce his demands through arms.

The Qing continued to hold Kashgar with occasional interruptions during the Afaqi Khoja revolts. One of the most serious of these occurred in 1827, when the city was taken by Jahanghir Khoja; Chang-lung, however, the Qing general of Ili, regained possession of Kashgar and the other rebellious cities in 1828.

The Kokand Khanate raided Kashgar several times. A revolt in 1829 under Mahommed Ali Khan and Yusuf, brother of Jahanghir resulted in the concession of several important trade privileges to the Muslims of the district of Altishahr (the "six cities"), as it was then called.

The area enjoyed relative calm until 1846 under the rule of Zahir-ud-din, the local Uyghur governor, but in that year a new Khoja revolt under Kath Tora led to his accession as the authoritarian ruler of the city. However, his reign was brief—at the end of seventy-five days, on the approach of the Chinese, he fled back to Khokand amid the jeers of the inhabitants. The last of the Khoja revolts (1857) was of about equal duration, and took place under Wali-Khan, who murdered the well-known traveller Adolf Schlagintweit.

=== Dungan Revolt ===
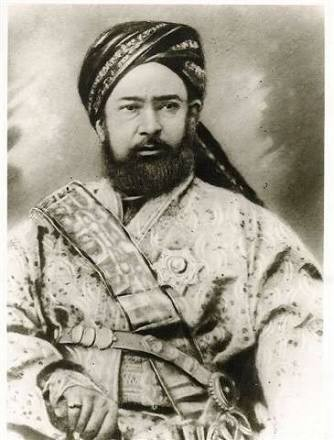
Yakub Beg, Emir of Yettishar

The Dungan Revolt (1862–1877) involved insurrection among various Muslim ethnic groups and resulted in the Dzungar genocide. It broke out in 1862 in Gansu then spread rapidly to Dzungaria and through the line of towns in the Tarim Basin.

Dungan troops based in Yarkand rose and in August 1864 massacred some seven thousand Chinese and their Manchu commander. The inhabitants of Kashgar, rising in their turn against their masters, invoked the aid of Sadik Beg, a Kyrgyz chief, who was reinforced by Buzurg Khan, the heir of Jahanghir Khoja, and his general Yakub Beg. The latter men were dispatched at Sadik's request by the ruler of Khokand to raise what troops they could to aid his Muslim friends in Kashgar.

Sadik Beg soon repented of having asked for a Khoja, and eventually marched against Kashgar, which by this time had succumbed to Buzurg Khan and Yakub Beg, but was defeated and driven back to Khokand. Buzurg Khan delivered himself up to indolence and debauchery, but Yakub Beg, with singular energy and perseverance, seized control of Kashgar, Yangihissar, Yarkand, and four other towns, Buzurg Khan proving himself totally unfit for the post of ruler. Yakub Beg subsequently proclaimed himself emir of Yettishar (lit. 'the Seven Cities').

With the overthrow of Chinese rule in 1865 by Yakub Beg, the manufacturing industries of Kashgar supposedly declined.

Yakub Beg entered into relations with the British and Russian Empires, and signed respective treaties with each. However, he failed to receive meaningful assistance from the two great powers when he was in need of their support against the Qing.

Kashgar and the other cities of the Tarim Basin remained under Yakub Beg's rule until May 1877, when he died in Korla. Thereafter Kashgaria was reconquered by the forces of the Qing general Zuo Zongtang during the Qing reconquest of Xinjiang.

=== Qing rule ===
There were eras in Xinjiang's history where intermarriage was common, and "laxity" set upon Uyghur women led them to marry Chinese men in the period after Yakub Beg's rule ended. It is also believed by Uyghurs that some Uyghurs have Han Chinese ancestry from historical intermarriage, such as those living in Turpan.

Even though Muslim women are forbidden to marry non-Muslims in Islamic law, from 1880 to 1949 it was frequently violated in Xinjiang when Chinese men married Uyghur women. Because they were viewed as "outcast", Islamic cemeteries banned the Uyghur wives of Chinese men from being buried within them. Uyghur women got around this problem by giving shrines donations and buying a grave in other towns. Besides Chinese men, other men such as Hindus, Armenians, Jews, Russians, and Badakhshanis (Pamiris) intermarried with local Uyghur women. The local society accepted the Uyghur women and Chinese men's mixed offspring as their own people despite the marriages being in violation of Islamic law.

An anti-Russian uproar broke out when Russian customs officials, 3 Cossacks and a Russian courier invited local Uyghur prostitutes to a party in January 1902 in Kashgar. There was a general anti-Russian sentiment, but the inflamed local Uyghur populace started a brawl with the Russians on the pretence of protecting their women. Even though morality was not strict in Kashgar, the local population confronted with the Russians before they were dispersed by guards, and the Chinese then sought to end tensions by preventing the Russians from building up a pretext to invade.

After the riot, the Russians sent troops to Sarikol in Tashkurghan and demanded that the Sarikol postal services be placed under Russian supervision. The locals of Sarikol believed that the Russians would seize the entire district from the Chinese and send more soldiers – even after the Russians tried to negotiate with the Begs of Sarikol and sway them to their side (they failed since the Sarikoli officials and authorities demanded in a petition to the Amban of Yarkand that they be evacuated to Yarkand to avoid being harassed by the Russians and objected to the Russian presence in Sarikol). The Sarikolis did not believe the Russian claim that they would leave them alone and only involved themselves in the mail service.

In 1902, a magnitude 7.7 earthquake caused up to 10,000 fatalities, including 667 in Kashgar. The earthquake was followed by a major aftershock a few days later, measuring M_{s} 6.8.

The British Empire had a consulate from 1890 to 1948 in Kashgar. Though a British consulate, it was staffed and funded by the Indian Political Department of British India. The consulate was not fully recognised by the Qing until 1908. It was upgraded to a consulate-general in 1911.

=== Republic of China ===
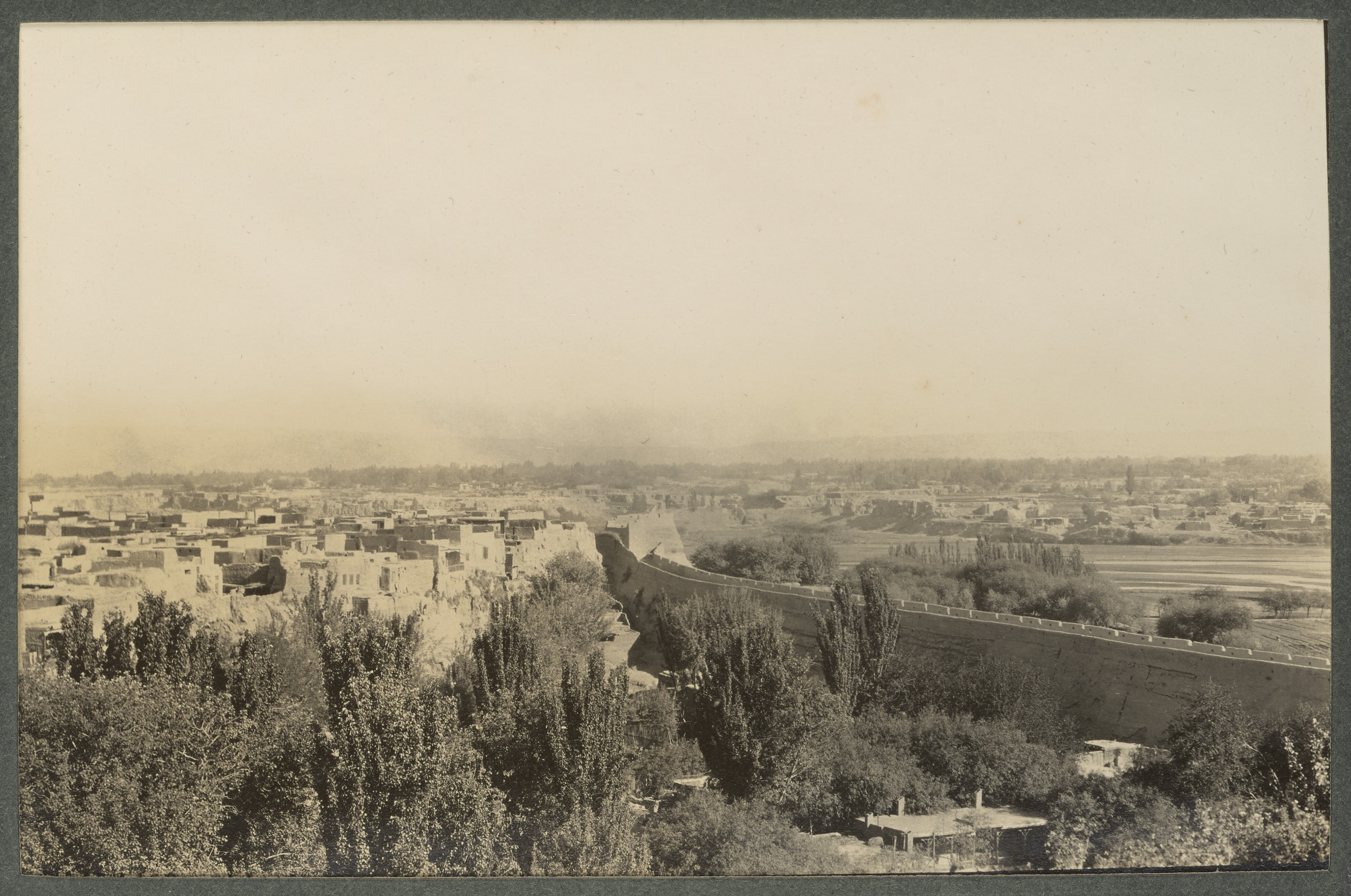
Kashgar in 1915

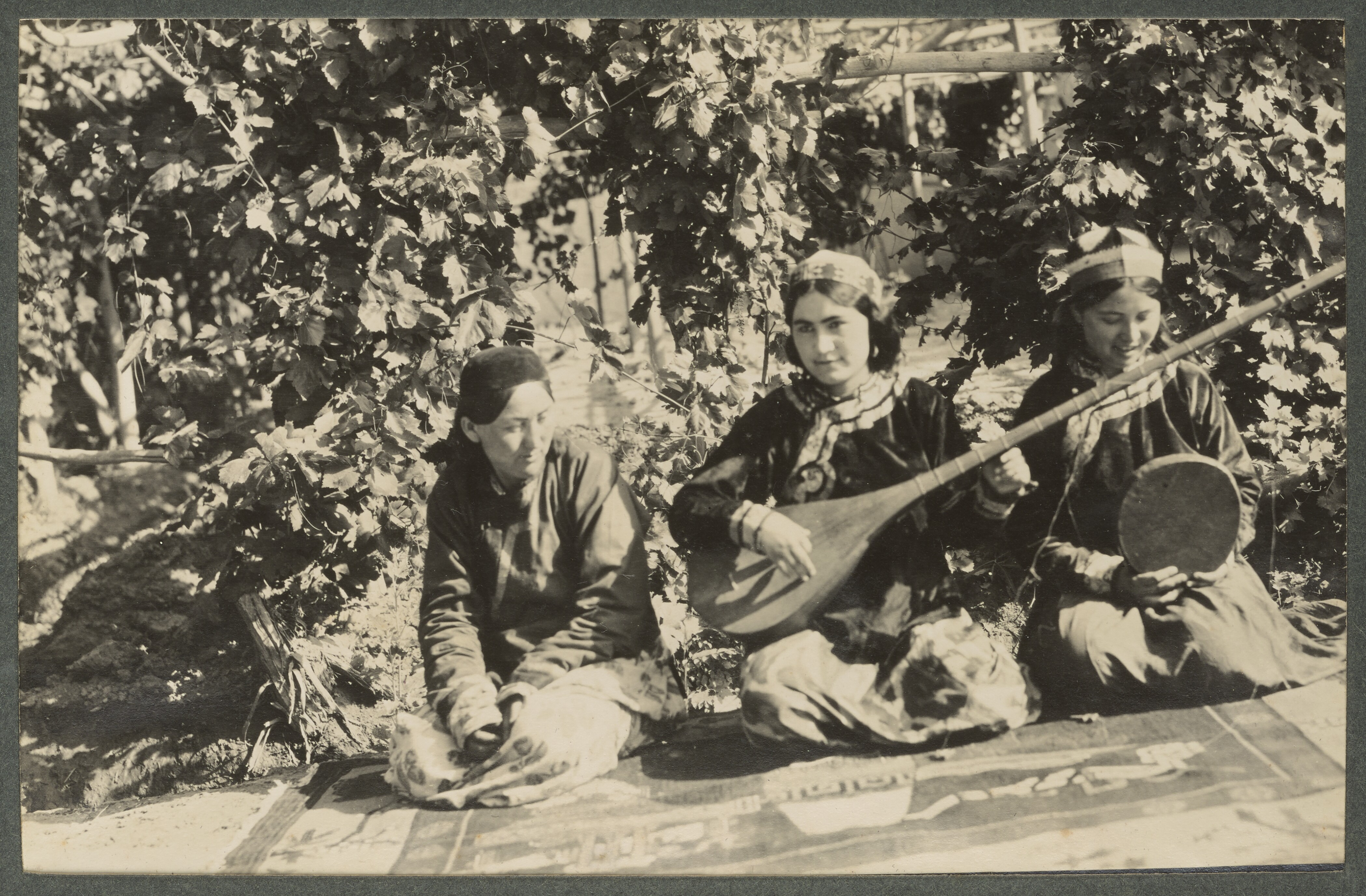
Uyghur musicians in Kashgar, 1915

From 1912 to 1928, Yang Zengxin, the Military Governor and later Governor of Xinjiang province, consolidated control over Xinjiang and maintained relative stability through a combination of limited military power, low taxation, and pragmatic accommodation of local elites. Kashgar remained an important administrative and military center in southern Xinjiang. The Republican government established Shule County in Kashgar in 1913, while regional administration was overseen by a Tao-yin (道尹, prefecture mayor), who was responsible for civil and military affairs. Yang relied on Hui (Chinese-speaking muslims) military leaders, including Ma Fuxing, to maintain order, but had Ma and his son executed in 1923 to eliminate potential threats and strengthen provincial control. During this period, the British consulate at Chini Bagh continued to monitor local developments. Although Kashgar remained relatively peaceful, Pan-Turkist ideas and Soviet influence were beginning to emerge in the region.

On 7 July 1928, Yang Zengxin was assassinated in Dihua (present Urumqi) during the July 7 coup. Jin Shuren subsequently assumed control of Xinjiang and was recognized by the Nationalist government in Nanjing. Departing from Yang’s relatively conciliatory approach, Jin relied more heavily on officials from his native Gansu and other Han Chinese officials, increased certain taxes, restricted the Hajj pilgrimage, and promoted the replacement of hereditary local rule with direct provincial administration. Following the death of the Kumul Khan in 1930, Jin abolished the hereditary Kumul Khanate in 1931. This decision contributed to the outbreak of the Kumul Rebellion, which became a major catalyst for wider unrest across Xinjiang and eventually affected southern Xinjiang including Kashgar.

Kashgar was the scene of continual battles from 1933 to 1934. Ma Shaowu, a Chinese-speaking Muslim, was the Tao-yin (mayor) of Kashgar, and he fought against Uyghur rebels. He was joined by another Chinese-speaking Muslim general, Ma Zhancang.

==== Battle of Kashgar (1933) ====
Uyghur and Kyrgyz forces, led by the Bughra brothers and Tawfiq Bay, attempted to take the New City of Kashgar from Chinese-speaking Muslim troops under General Ma Zhancang. They were defeated.

Tawfiq Bey, a Syrian Arab traveller, who held the title Sayyid (descendant of Muhammed) and arrived at Kashgar on 26 August 1933, was shot in the stomach by the Chinese-speaking Muslim troops in September. Previously Ma Zhancang arranged to have the Uyghur leader Timur Beg killed and beheaded on 9 August 1933, displaying his head outside of Id Kah Mosque.

Han Chinese troops commanded by Brigadier Yang were absorbed into Ma Zhancang's army. A number of Han Chinese officers were spotted wearing the green uniforms of Ma Zhancang's unit of the 36th division; presumably they had converted to Islam.

==== Battle of Kashgar (1934) ====
The 36th division General Ma Fuyuan led a Chinese-speaking Muslim army to storm Kashgar on 6 February 1934, attacking the Uyghur and Kyrgyz rebels of the First East Turkestan Republic. He freed another 36th division general, Ma Zhancang, who was trapped with his Chinese-speaking Muslim and Han Chinese troops in Kashgar New City by the Uyghurs and Kyrgyz since 22 May 1933. In January 1934, Ma Zhancang's Chinese-speaking Muslim troops repulsed six Uyghur attacks, launched by Khoja Niyaz, who arrived at the city on 13 January 1934, inflicting massive casualties on the Uyghur forces. On 6 February 1934, The Hui (Chinese-speaking Muslim) forces captured the Old City of Kashgar without significant resistance, forcing the leaders of the separatist administration to flee and ending its control over Kashgar. From 1,700 to 2,000 Uyghur civilians in Kashgar Old City were massacred by Tungans in February 1934, in revenge for the Kizil massacre, after retreating of Uyghur forces from the city to Yengi Hisar. The Hui and 36th division Chief General Ma Zhongying, who arrived at Kashgar on 7 April 1934, gave a speech at Id Kah Mosque in April, reminding the Uyghurs to be loyal to the Republic of China government in Nanjing. Several British citizens at the British consulate were killed or wounded by the 36th division on 16 March 1934.

Although remnants of its forces continued to resist from Yengisar, their defeat on 16 April 1934 marked the final collapse of the remaining resistance. The short-lived “East Turkestan Islamic Republic” established in Kashgar in November 1933 was dismantled by Ma Zhongying’s forces and provincial government troops in early 1934.

Since 1933, Governor of Xinjiang Province, Xinjiang's warlord, Sheng Shicai, gradually took control of Xinjiang’s military and political affairs. With Soviet military support, he defeated Ma Zhongying’s forces and regained control of southern Xinjiang, including Kashgar, by around July 1934. Sheng then strengthened military garrisons and established a more centralized provincial administration, consolidating his control over Kashgar and other parts of southern Xinjiang. Cavalry units and other troops were stationed in Kashgar, while local administration was brought under Sheng’s “Six Great Policies”. During this period, the Soviet Union had significant political, economic, and military influence in Xinjiang.

After 1942, Sheng Shicai shifted his allegiance to the Nationalist government and was transferred out of Xinjiang in 1944. The Nationalist government strengthened its direct administration of Xinjiang, while governance in the Kashgar region remained focused on maintaining order, controlling the military situation, and managing ethnic, religious, and border affairs.

=== People's Republic of China ===
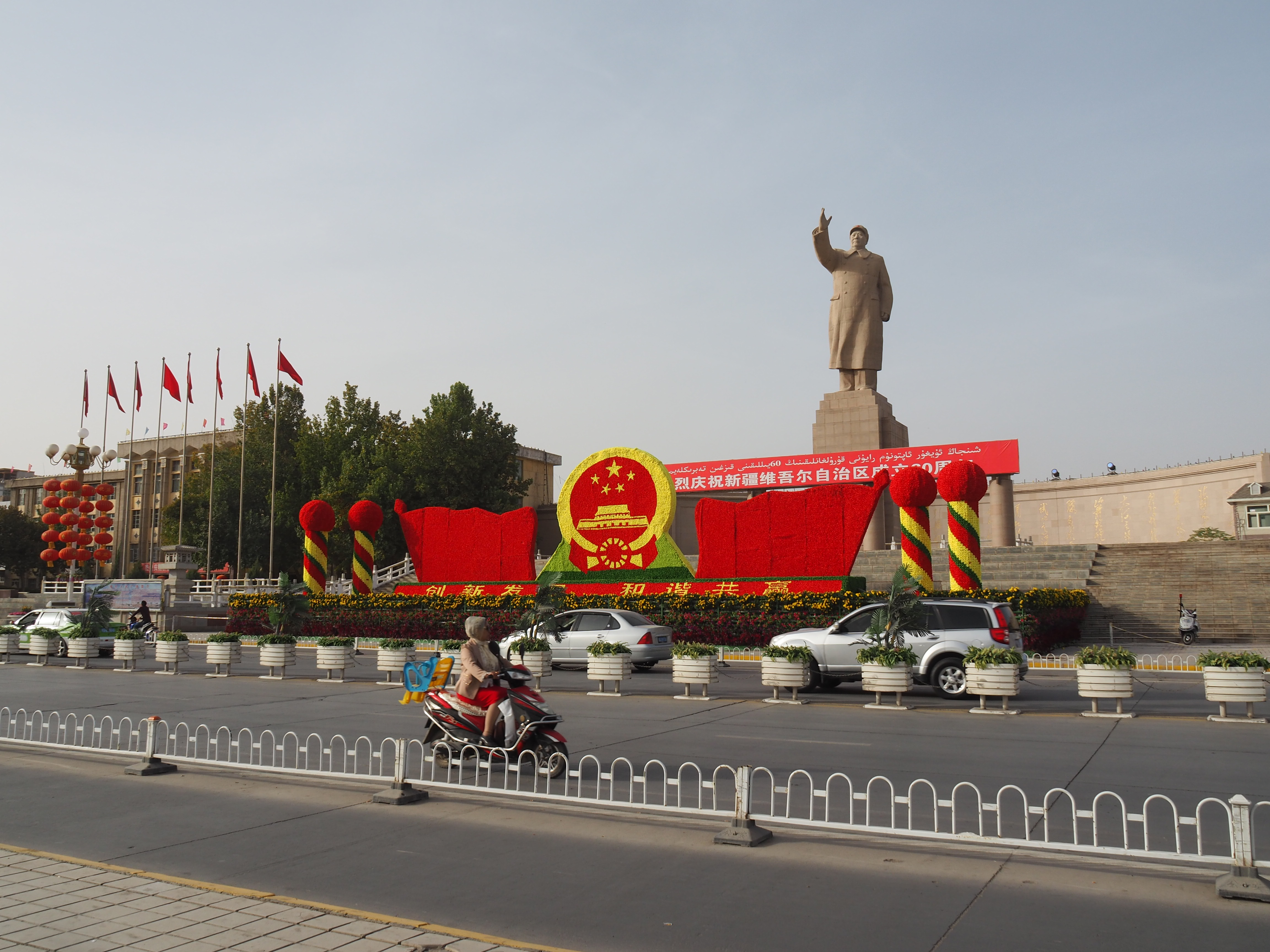
People's Park in the centre of Kashgar, during celebrations of the 60th anniversary of the establishment of the Xinjiang Uygur Autonomous Region

In September 1949, the Kuomintang (KMT) military and provincial authorities in Xinjiang declared their allegiance to the Chinese Communist Party, leading to the peaceful incorporation of Xinjiang into the People’s Republic of China. Units of the People’s Liberation Army (PLA) First Field Army entered Xinjiang in October 1949 and subsequently advanced into southern Xinjiang, including Kashgar.

On 31 October 1981, an incident occurred in the city due to a dispute between Uyghurs and Han Chinese in which three were killed. The incident was quelled by an army unit.

In 1986, the Chinese government designated Kashgar a "city of historical and cultural significance". Kashgar and surrounding regions have been the site of Uyghur unrest since the 1990s. In 2008, two Uyghur men carried out a vehicular, IED and knife attack against police officers.

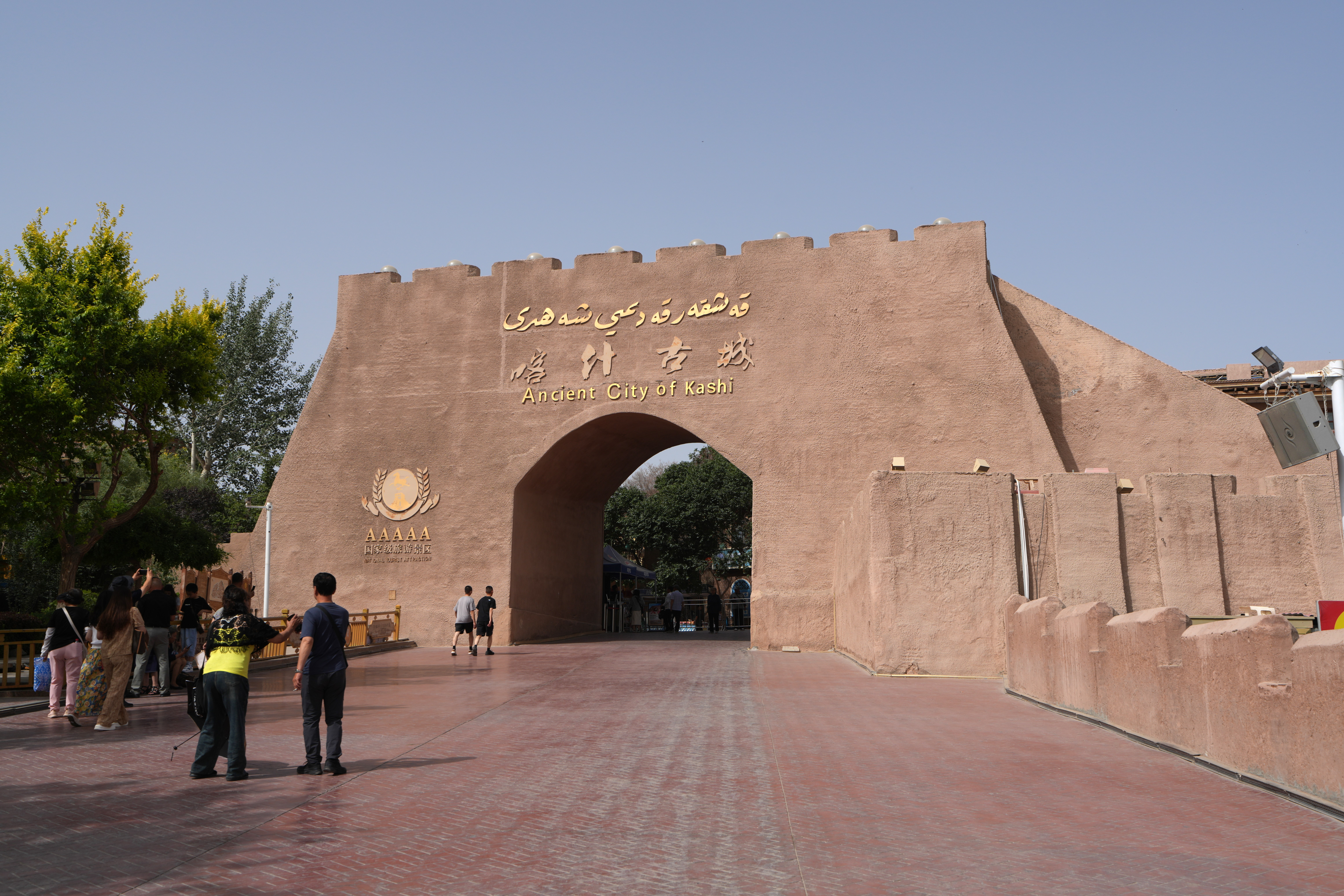
Kashgar Old City gate in 2025

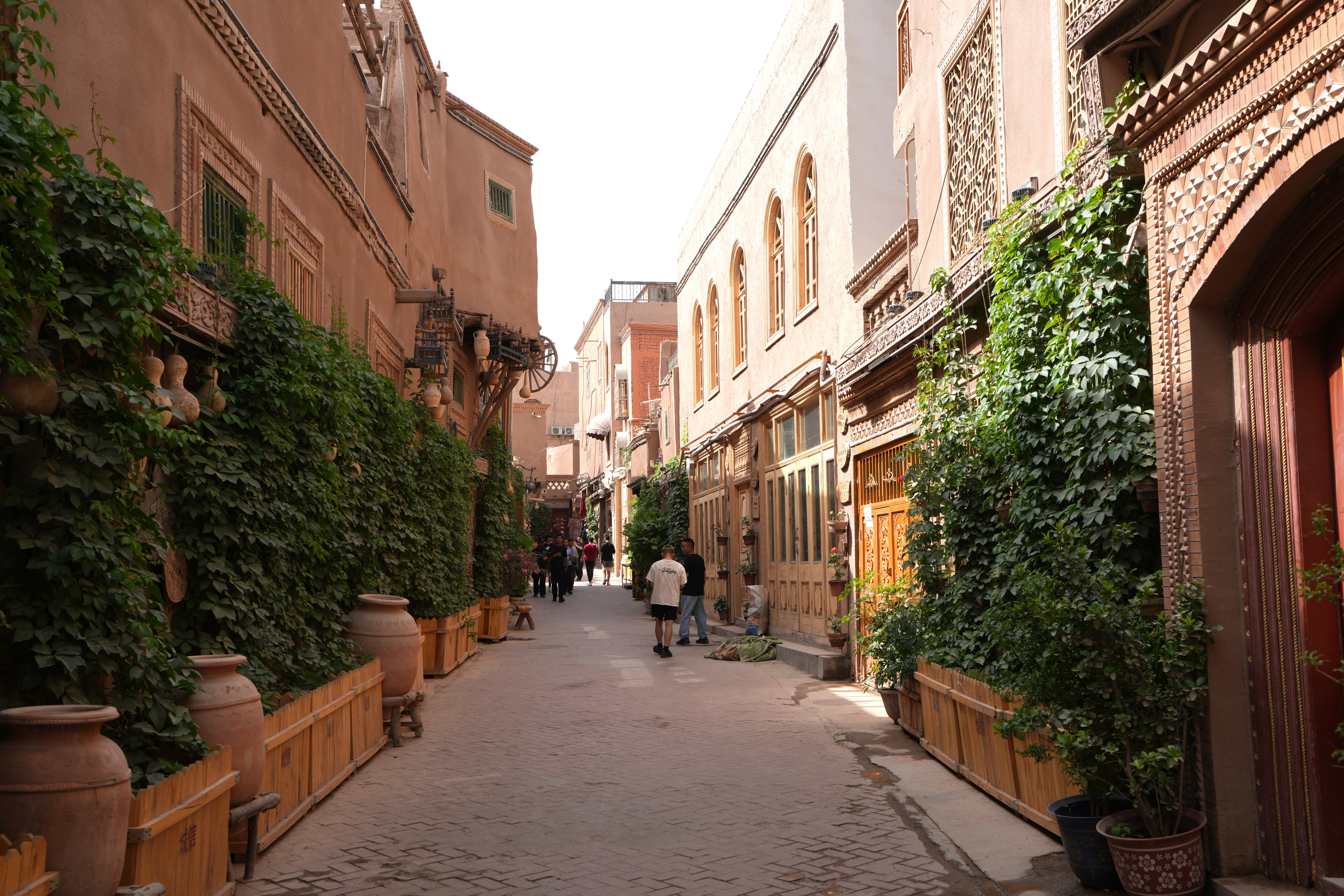
Kashgar Old City in 2025

In 2009, development of Kashgar's old town accelerated after the revelations of the deadly role of faulty architecture during the 2008 Sichuan earthquake. Many of the old houses in the old town were built without regulation, and as a result, officials found them to be overcrowded and non-compliant with fire and earthquake codes. When the plan started, 42 per cent of the city's residents lived in the old town. As the plan was undertaken, residents have been removed from their homes in order to demolish large sections of the old city and replace these areas with new developments. The European Parliament issued a resolution in 2011 calling for "culture-sensitive methods of renovation." The International Scientific Committee on Earthen Architectural Heritage (ISCEAH) has expressed concern over the demolition and reconstruction of historic buildings. ISCEAH has, additionally, urged the implementation of techniques utilised elsewhere in the world to address earthquake vulnerability.

Following the July 2009 Ürümqi riots, the government focused on local economic development in an attempt to ameliorate ethnic tensions in the greater Xinjiang region. Kashgar was made into a Special Economic Zone in 2010, the first such zone in China's far west. In 2011, a series of attacks including bombings by the Turkistan Islamic Party killed dozens of people.

By May 2012, a large part of the old city had been rebuilt. According to the Chinese government, demolition and rebuilding was necessary because houses in the old city were "extremely vulnerable to earthquakes and fire"; the 2003 Bachu earthquake had destroyed thousands of buildings in the region. Some critics disputed the vulnerability of old city buildings to earthquakes and said the rebuilding was done partially in order to fulfil the political goal of eroding Uyghur culture. Over the last two decades, similar demolition of historic architecture followed by their replacement by more commercialised properties have also been ongoing in the rest of China, often with inadequate consultation of local residents. The Uyghur Human Rights Project in Turkey have called the destruction of the old city part of a campaign of cultural genocide. On the contrary, the authorities stated that the project was intended to address unsafe housing, inadequate infrastructure, and disaster risks in the densely populated old city, and the government was striving to 'protect the traditional neighborhood with its distinctive Uygur charicteristics' and 'prevent it from being excessively commercialized'. Academic research has also identified weaknesses in the old city’s overall resilience to natural disturbances and highlighted tensions between traditional building practices and modern disaster-prevention requirements.

In July 2014, the Imam of the Id Kah Mosque, Juma Tayir, was assassinated in Kashgar by Uyghur extremists. On 21 October 2014, Aqqash Township (Akekashi) was transferred from Shufu County to Kashgar.

== Climate ==
Kashgar features a cool arid climate (Köppen BWk, Trewartha BWao) with hot summers and cold winters creating a large temperature difference between those two seasons: The monthly 24-hour average temperature ranges from −5.2 °C (22.6 °F) in January to 25.9 °C (78.6 °F) in July, while the annual mean is 12.6 °C (54.7 °F). Spring is long and arrives quickly, while autumn is somewhat brief in comparison. Kashgar is one of the driest cities on the planet, averaging only 85.2 mm (3.35 in) of precipitation per year. The city's wettest month, May, only sees on average 14.0 mm (0.55 in) of rain. Because of the extremely arid conditions, snowfall is rare, despite the cold winters. Records have been as low as −24.4 °C (−12 °F) on 12 January 1959 and as high as 40.1 °C (104.2 °F) on 12 July 1958. The frost-free period averages 215 days. With monthly per cent possible sunshine ranging from 52% in January to 74% in October, the city receives 2,862.6 hours of bright sunshine annually.

Climate data for Kashgar, elevation 1,386 m (4,547 ft), (1991–2020 normals, extremes 1951–present)
Month	Jan	Feb	Mar	Apr	May	Jun	Jul	Aug	Sep	Oct	Nov	Dec	Year
Record high °C (°F)	19.2 (66.6)	25.8 (78.4)	29.2 (84.6)	34.8 (94.6)	39.5 (103.1)	38.6 (101.5)	40.1 (104.2)	39.6 (103.3)	35.0 (95.0)	31.1 (88.0)	25.2 (77.4)	20.4 (68.7)	40.1 (104.2)
Mean daily maximum °C (°F)	0.1 (32.2)	6.0 (42.8)	15.1 (59.2)	22.9 (73.2)	26.9 (80.4)	30.5 (86.9)	32.1 (89.8)	30.7 (87.3)	26.6 (79.9)	20.2 (68.4)	11.4 (52.5)	2.1 (35.8)	18.7 (65.7)
Daily mean °C (°F)	−5.2 (22.6)	0.4 (32.7)	9.2 (48.6)	16.4 (61.5)	20.4 (68.7)	24.2 (75.6)	25.9 (78.6)	24.5 (76.1)	20.0 (68.0)	13.1 (55.6)	4.8 (40.6)	−2.8 (27.0)	12.6 (54.6)
Mean daily minimum °C (°F)	−9.9 (14.2)	−4.7 (23.5)	3.4 (38.1)	9.8 (49.6)	14.1 (57.4)	17.6 (63.7)	19.5 (67.1)	18.2 (64.8)	13.5 (56.3)	6.5 (43.7)	−0.8 (30.6)	−6.9 (19.6)	6.7 (44.1)
Record low °C (°F)	−24.4 (−11.9)	−23.5 (−10.3)	−15.6 (3.9)	−3.6 (25.5)	−1.0 (30.2)	6.8 (44.2)	7.9 (46.2)	7.3 (45.1)	3.2 (37.8)	−6.4 (20.5)	−16.6 (2.1)	−23.6 (−10.5)	−24.4 (−11.9)
Average precipitation mm (inches)	3.3 (0.13)	6.2 (0.24)	5.7 (0.22)	6.4 (0.25)	14.0 (0.55)	9.4 (0.37)	10.8 (0.43)	11.4 (0.45)	7.8 (0.31)	4.7 (0.19)	2.8 (0.11)	2.7 (0.11)	85.2 (3.36)
Average precipitation days (≥ 0.1 mm)	2.8	2.4	2.2	2.0	4.0	4.8	4.9	5.0	3.2	1.4	0.9	2.7	36.3
Average snowy days	7.2	4.3	1.3	0.1	0	0	0	0	0	0	1.0	6.1	20
Average relative humidity (%)	65	56	42	35	37	37	41	47	50	51	56	68	49
Mean monthly sunshine hours	159.3	168.6	201.3	233.2	281.3	316.8	328.2	303.6	265.4	250.4	201.4	153.1	2,862.6
Percentage possible sunshine	52	55	54	58	63	71	73	73	73	74	68	53	64
Source: China Meteorological Administration extremes all-time January high all-time February high

== Administrative divisions ==
Kashgar includes 8 subdistricts (كوچا باشقارمىسى / 街道), 2 towns (بازىرى / 镇), and 9 townships (يېزىسى / 乡).

Name	Simplified Chinese	Hanyu Pinyin	Uyghur (UEY)	Uyghur Latin (ULY)	Administrative division code	Notes
Subdistricts
Chasa Subdistrict (Qiasa Subdistrict)	恰萨街道	Qiàsà Jiēdào	چاسا كوچا باشقارمىسى	Chasa kocha bashqarmisi	653101001	
Yawagh Subdistrict (Yawage Subdistrict)	亚瓦格街道	Yàwǎgé Jiēdào	ياۋاغ كوچا باشقارمىسى	Yawagh kocha bashqarmisi	653101002	
Östeng Boyi Subdistrict (Wusitangboyi Subdistrict)	吾斯塘博依街道	Wúsītángbóyī Jiēdào	ئۆستەڭ بويى كوچا باشقارمىسى	Östeng boyi kocha bashqarmisi	653101003	
Qum Derwaza Subdistrict (Kumudai'erwazha Subdistrict)	库木代尔瓦扎街道	Kùmùdài'ěrwǎzhā Jiēdào	قۇم دەرۋازا كوچا باشقارمىسى	Qum derwaza kocha bashqarmisi	653101004	
Gherbiy Yurt Avenue Subdistrict (Xiyu Dadao Subdistrict)	西域大道街道	Xīyùdàdào Jiēdào	غەربىي يۇرت يولى كوچا باشقارمىسى	Gherbiy yurt yoli kocha bashqarmisi	653101005	
Sherqiy Köl Subdistrict (Donghu Subdistrict)	东湖街道	Dōnghú Jiēdào	شەرقىي كۆل كوچا باشقارمىسى	Sherqiy köl kocha bashqarmisi	653101006	
Merhaba Avenue Subdistrict (Yingbin Dadao Subdistrict)	迎宾大道街道	Yíngbīndàdào Jiēdào	مەرھابا يولى كوچا باشقارمىسى	Merhaba yoli kocha bashqarmisi	653101007	
Gherbiy Baghcha Subdistrict (Xigongyuan Subdistrict)	西公园街道	Xīgōngyuán Jiēdào	غەربىي باغچا كوچا باشقارمىسى	Gherbiy baghcha kocha bashqarmisi	653101008	
Towns
Nezerbagh Town (Naize'er Bage Town)	乃则尔巴格镇	Nǎizé'ěrbāgé Zhèn	نەزەرباغ بازىرى	Nezerbagh baziri	653101100	formerly Nezerbagh Township (乃则尔巴格乡)
Shamalbagh Town (Xiamalebage Town)	夏马勒巴格镇	Xiāmǎlèbāgé Zhèn	شامالباغ بازىرى	Shamalbagh baziri	653101101	formerly Shamalbagh Township (夏马勒巴格乡)
Townships
Döletbagh Township (Duolaitebage Township)	多来特巴格乡	Duōláitèbāgé Xiāng	دۆلەتباغ يېزىسى	Döletbagh yëzisi	653101202	
Qoghan Township (Haohan Township)	浩罕乡	Hàohǎn Xiāng	قوغان يېزىسى	Qoghan yëzisi	653101203	
Semen Township (Seman Township)	色满乡	Sèmǎn Xiāng	سەمەن يېزىسى	Semen yëzisi	653101204	
Xangdi Township (Huangdi Township)	荒地乡	Huāngdì Xiāng	خاڭدى يېزىسى	Xangdi yëzisi	653101205	
Paxtekle Township (Pahataikeli Township)	帕哈太克里乡	Pàhātàikèlǐ Xiāng	پاختەكلە يېزىسى	Paxtekle yëzisi	653101206	
Beshkërem Township (Baishikeranmu Township)	伯什克然木乡	Bóshíkèránmù Xiāng	بەشكېرەم يېزىسى	Beshkërem yëzisi	653101207	
Awat Township (Awati Township)	阿瓦提乡	Āwǎtí Xiāng	ئاۋات يېزىسى	Awat yëzisi	653101208	
Yëngi'östeng Township (Yingwusitan Township)	英吾斯坦乡 (英吾斯塘乡)	Yīngwúsītǎn Xiāng (Yīngwúsītáng Xiāng)	يېڭىئۆستەڭ يېزىسى	Yëngi'östeng yëzisi	653101209	
Aqqash Township (Akekashi Township)	阿克喀什乡	Ākèkāshí Xiāng	ئاققاش يېزىسى	Aqqash yëzisi	653101210	

== Demographics ==
Ethnic breakdown of Kashgar (2018)
Nationality	Percentage
Uyghurs	85.8%
Han	13.5%
Hui	0.2%
Uzbeks	0.2%
Others	0.3%

Kashgar is predominantly populated by Muslim Uyghurs. Compared to Xinjiang's capital and largest city Ürümqi, Kashgar is less industrial and has significantly fewer Han Chinese residents. In 1998, the urban population of Kashgar was recorded as 311,141, with 81 per cent Uyghurs and 18 per cent Han Chinese.

In 1999, 81.24 per cent of the population of Kashgar was Uyghur and 17.87 per cent of the population was Han Chinese.

In the 2000 census, the population of the city of Kashgar was given as 340,640. In the 2010 census, this number increased to 506,640. Some of the increase is due to boundary changes and the number may include some rural population.

In the 2015 census, 534,848 of the 628,302 residents of the county were Uyghur, 88,583 were Han Chinese and 66,131 were from other ethnic groups.

== Economy ==
=== Kashgar Sunday market ===
The Kashgar Sunday Market (Chinese: 中西亚市场; lit. 'Central–Western Asia market'; Uyghur: يەكشەنبە بازار, lit. 'Sunday bazaar'), also known locally as the Kashgar Livestock Market (Chinese: 牛羊大巴扎), is the largest market in Central Asia and an important part of the city's local economy. It is held every Sunday near Aizirete Village (Chinese: 艾孜热特村) about 5 kilometres northeast of the city centre, and boasts an attendance of 100,000 at peak hours. It is a meeting place of Kashgar's farmers, ranchers, artisans, and merchants. Farmers from the surrounding fertile lands come to the market to sell a wide variety of fruits and vegetables. Ranchers parade their livestock and offer their horses for test rides. Artisans sell their handmade crafts such as knives, pans, teapots, and jewellery boxes. Traditional carpets and clothing are also popular among tourists. A hot commodity at the market is saffron from Iran, which is worth three times more than the local value of gold.

=== Special economic zone ===
The Chinese government designated Kashgar as the sixth special economic zone of China in May 2010, in hopes that it would encourage foreign investment in the region. Critics, however, questioned the government's decision to choose Kashgar, citing the city's undesirable location and the predominance of agriculture in the local economy rather than heavy industry. For example, scholars Bill Chou and Xuejie Ding note that Kashgar is unattractive to both domestic and foreign investors because it is thousands of kilometres away from China's major commercial hubs and borders developing countries. The wider Kashgar Prefecture is also one of Xinjiang's poorest and least developed prefecture-level divisions, having the third-lowest GDP per capita among them.

== Notable sites ==
Panorama of Kashgar Ancient City, 2026

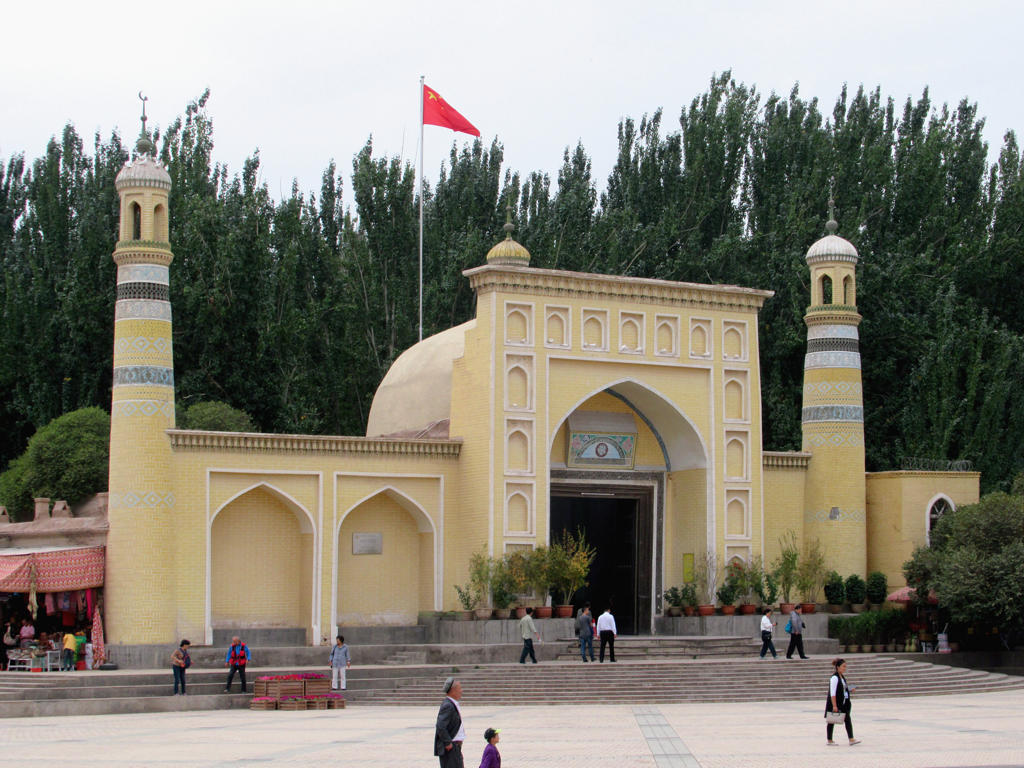
Id Kah Mosque

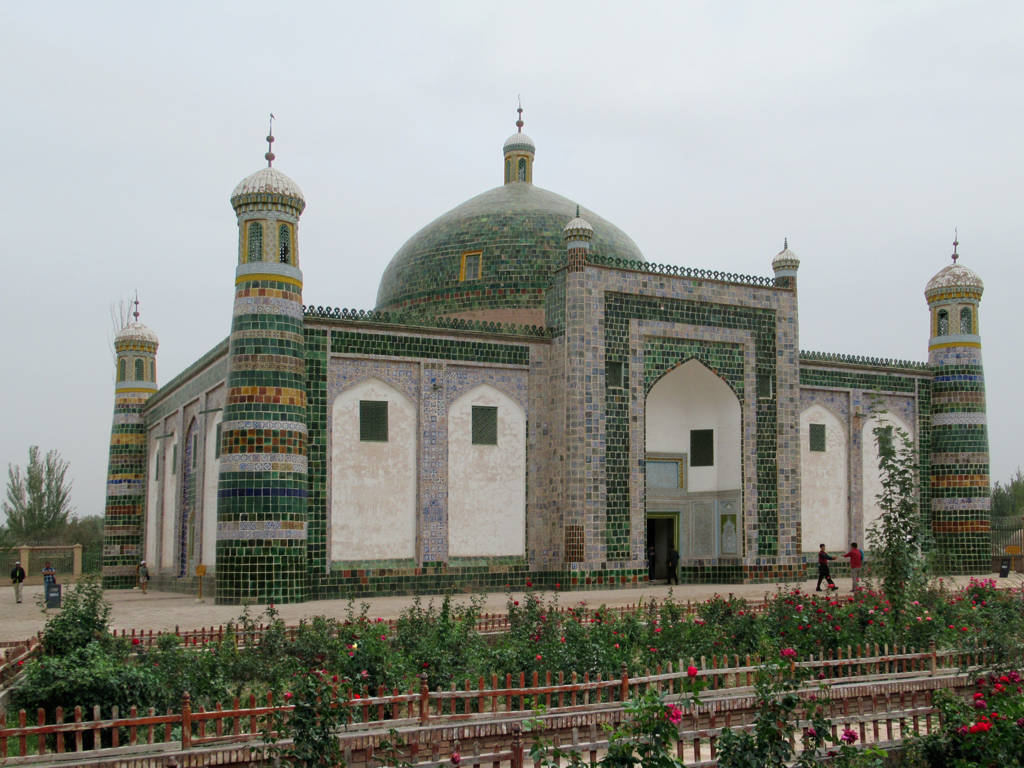
Afaq Khoja Mausoleum

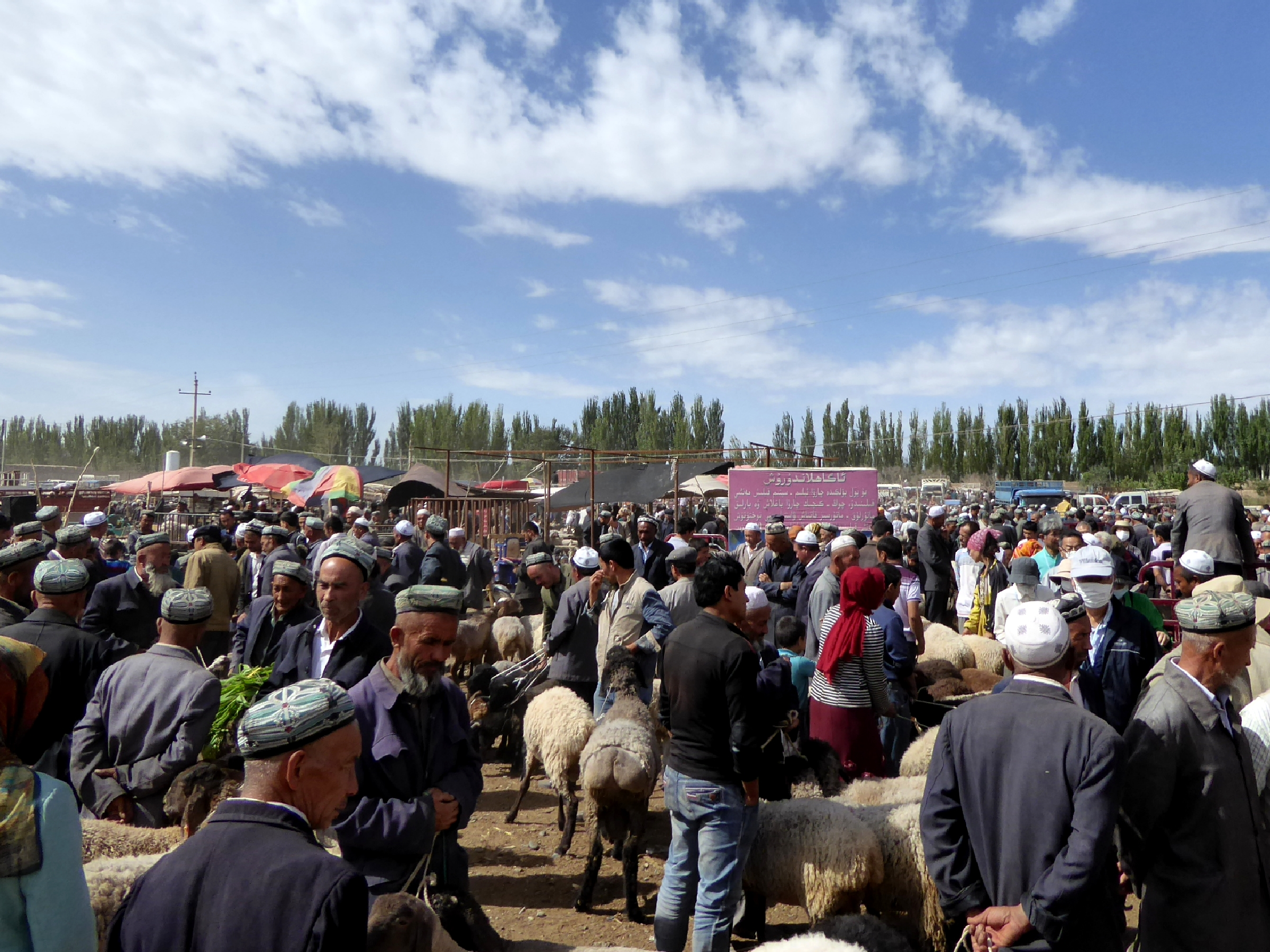
Kashgar Sunday Market
- Kashgar Ancient City (Chinese: 喀什古城), before its demolition and reconstruction, had been described as "the best-preserved example of a traditional Islamic city to be found anywhere in Central Asia". Every morning at 10:30 am, there is a grand opening ceremony held outside the east gate. It was estimated to attract more than one million tourists annually.
- Id Kah Mosque, one of the largest mosques in Xinjiang, is located in the heart of the city.
- Afaq Khoja Mausoleum is the tomb of Afaq Khoja and one of the holiest Muslim sites in Xinjiang. Built in the 17th century, the tiled mausoleum 5 km (3.1 mi) northeast of the city centre also contains the tombs of five generations of his family. Abakh was a powerful ruler, controlling Khotan, Yarkand, Korla, Kucha and Aksu as well as Kashgar. Among some Uyghur Muslims, he was considered a great saint (Aulia). The mausoleum is located within a park called the Fragrant Concubine Garden (Chinese: 香妃园; pinyin: Xiāng Fēi Yuán) built to commemorate the Fragrant Concubine.
- People's Park is the main public park in Kashgar, located in the city's centre.
  - The 18 m (59 ft) tall statue of Mao Zedong in People's Park is one of the few large-scale statues of Mao remaining in China.
- The Kashgar Sunday Market, also known locally as the Kashgar Livestock Market (Chinese: 喀什牛羊大巴扎) and located about 5 km (3.1 mi) northeast of the city centre, is renowned as the biggest market in central Asia; a pivotal trading point along the Silk Road where goods have been traded for more than 2,000 years. The market is open every day but it is the busiest on Sundays.

== Transportation ==
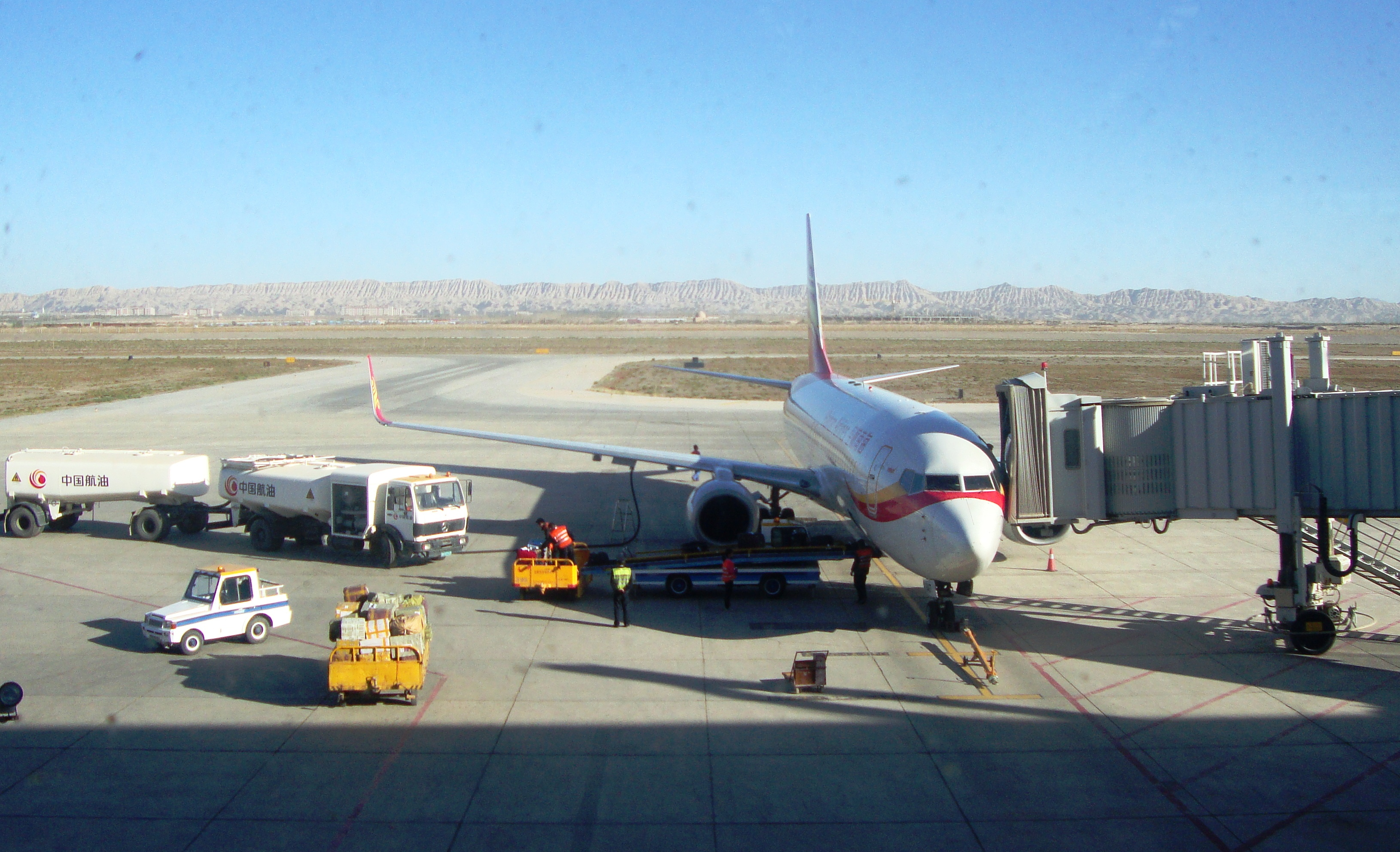
Kashgar Airport

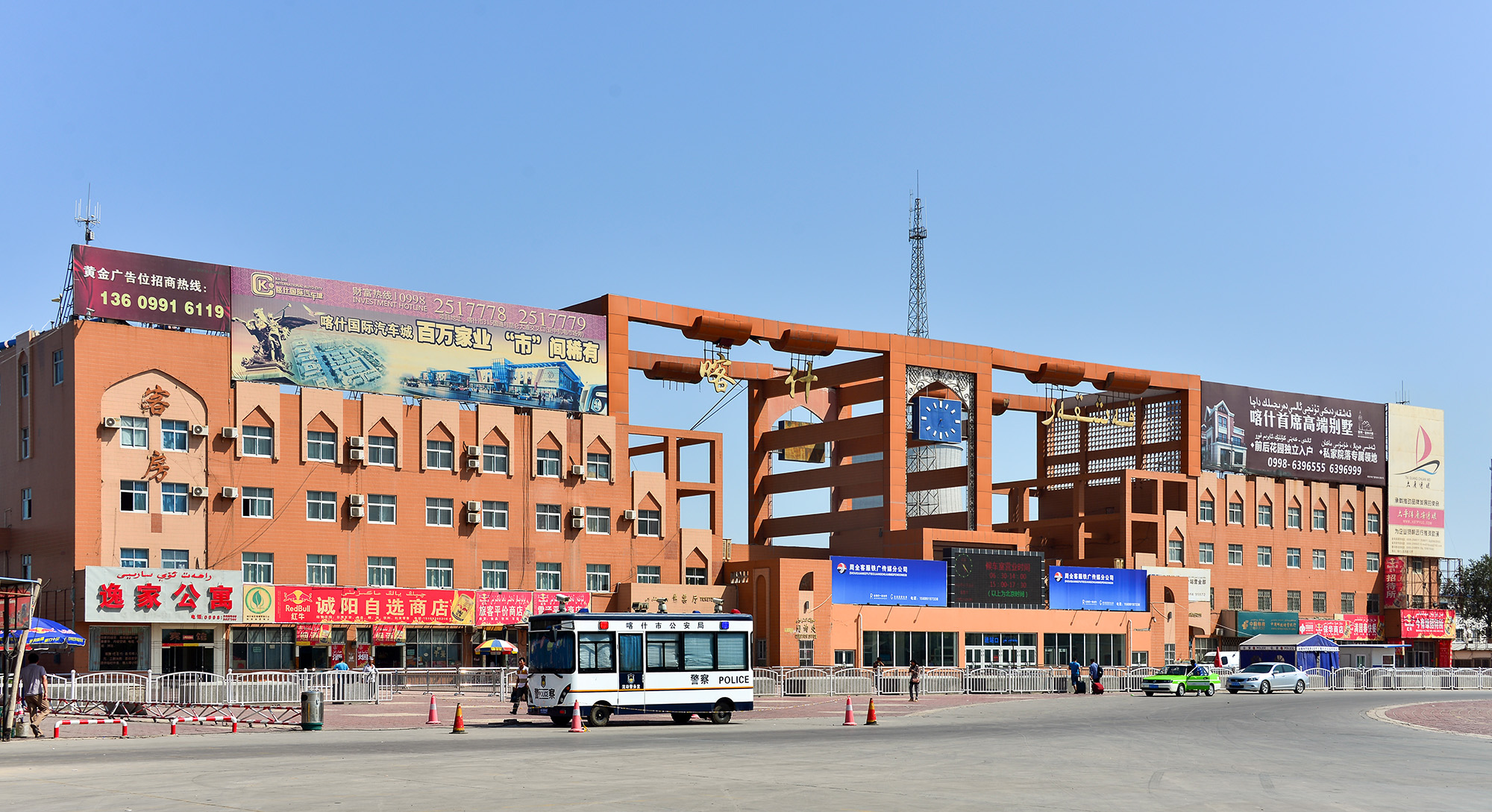
Kashgar railway station

=== Air ===
Kashi Laining International Airport serves mainly domestic flights, the majority of them from Urumqi.

=== Rail ===
Kashgar has the westernmost railway station in China. It is connected to the rest of China's rail network via the Southern Xinjiang Railway, which was built in December 1999. Kashgar–Hotan Railway opened for passenger traffic in June 2011, and connected Kashgar with cities in the southern Tarim Basin including Shache (Yarkand), Yecheng (Kargilik) and Hotan. Travel time to Urumqi from Kashgar is approximately 16 hours, while travel time to Hotan is approximately 5 hours.

The investigation work of a further extension of the railway line to Pakistan has begun. In November 2009, Pakistan and China agreed to set up a joint venture to do a feasibility study of the proposed rail link via the Khunjerab Pass.

Proposals for a rail connection to Osh in Kyrgyzstan have also been discussed at various levels since at least 1996.

A standard gauge railway from Kashgar via Tajikistan and Afghanistan to Iran and beyond has been proposed. It would connect China to the Mediterranean Sea and beyond over standard gauge railways only.

=== Road ===
The Karakoram Highway (KKH) links Islamabad, Pakistan with Kashgar over the Khunjerab Pass. The China–Pakistan Economic Corridor is a multibillion-dollar project that will upgrade transport links between China and Pakistan, including the upgrades to the Karakoram Highway. Bus routes exist for passenger travel south into Pakistan. Kyrgyzstan is also accessible from Kashgar, via the Torugart Pass or the Irkeshtam Pass; as of summer 2007, daily bus service connects Kashgar with Bishkek's Western Bus Terminal. Kashgar is also located on China National Highways G314 (which runs to Khunjerab Pass on the Sino−Pakistani border, and, in the opposite direction, towards Ürümqi), and G315, which runs to Xining, Qinghai from Kashgar.

== Sister cities ==
- Malacca City, Malaysia, from February 2012

== Notable people ==
- Mahmud al-Kashgari, 11th-century scholar
- Abdurehim Heyit, Uyghur folk singer
- Nury Turkel, Uyghur American human rights advocate

== See also ==
- Silk Road transmission of Buddhism
