= People's Park (Kashgar) =

Public park in Kashgar, Xinjiang, China

- Renmin Park
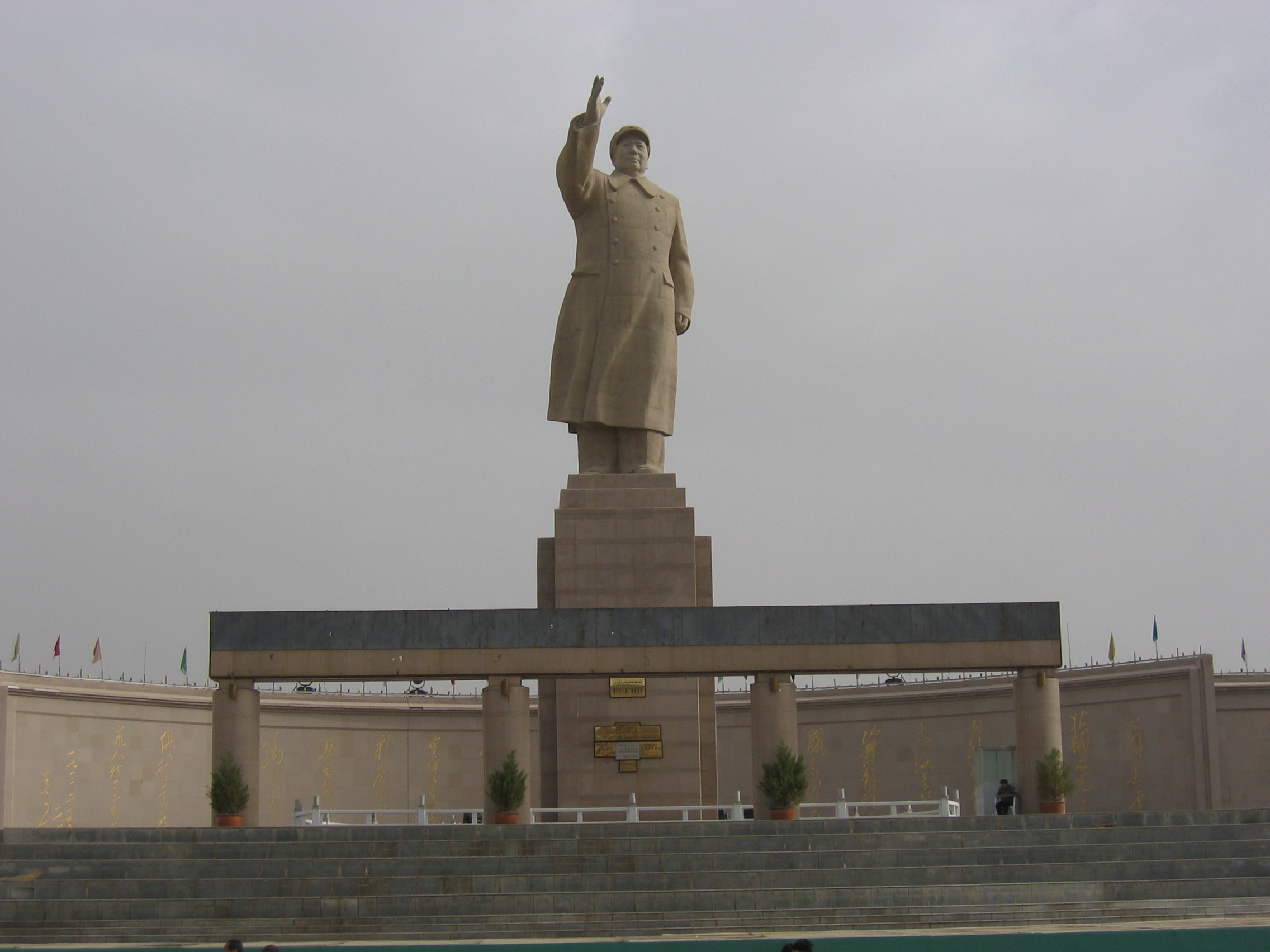
- The Mao statue overlooking People's Park
- Interactive map of People's Park
- Type: Urban park
- Location: Kashgar, Xinjiang, China
- Coordinates: 39.46335°N 75.98988°E
- Area: 24 ha (59 acres)

People's Park (Chinese: 人民公园; pinyin: Rénmín Gōngyuán) is an urban public park in the city of Kashgar in Xinjiang Uyghur Autonomous Region, western China. The 24-hectare (59-acre) park is one of the largest in Kashgar.

Located in the center of Kashgar, south of the People's Square, People's Park is one of the main recreational places in the city. It has more than 26,000 trees of more than 50 species, and 4,000 metres (13,000 ft) of trails. The park's facilities include an artificial lake, pavilions, a Uyghur-style cultural palace, children's playgrounds, orchards, a zoo, and a rollerskating rink. Admission is free.

On the main thoroughfare outside People's Park stands a large statue of Mao Zedong, with a hand raised toward the park.
