= Tashkent rebellion (1847) =

In 1847, there was a national uprising in Tashkent against the Khanate of Kokand, which had ruled the city since 1810. The governor, Aziz Parvonachi, was driven from the city, creating a vacuum in which various Kokand potentates vied for power. The Khojas of Chinese Turkestan took advantage of the absence of Khan Muhammad Khudayar Khan on campaign in Tashkent to launch the Holy War of the Seven Khojas against the Qing dynasty.
