= Tashkent rebellion =

Tashkent rebellion (or revolt, uprising) may refer to:

- Tashkent rebellion (1847)
- 1892 Tashkent cholera riot
- Tashkent rebellion (1917)
- Tashkent anti-Soviet revolt of 1919

== See also ==
- Battle of Tashkent
- Siege of Tashkent
