= Holy War of the Seven Khojas =

Revolt against the Qing dynasty of China

- Part of the Afaqi Khoja revolts
Date	1847
Location	Altishahr (Xinjiang)
Result	Qing victory

Belligerents
Qing dynasty	Khoqand Khanate; Aqtāghlïq Khojas

Commanders and leaders
Daoguang Emperor; Yishan	Katta Khan; Wālī Khān; Kichik Khan; Tawakkul Khoja

Holy War of the Seven Khojas, also known as the Rebellion of the Seven Khojas (Chinese: 七和卓之亂), was a revolt against the Qing dynasty of China, which broke out in 1847 during the reign of the Daoguang Emperor. The revolt was led by seven Muslim leaders in Xinjiang, including Walī Khan, Katta Khan, Kichik Khan and Tawakkul Khoja. The rebels, backed by Kokand Khanate, attacked on Kashgar, Yarkand and Yangi Hisar in the name of a "holy war". The revolt was unsuccessful, but it could in some ways be seen as the initial stages of the uprisings against Qing rule in Altishahr.

== See also ==
- Xinjiang under Qing rule
- Afaqi Khoja revolts
