= Khuiten River =

River in Mongolia

Khuiten River is a small, relatively swift-flowing but meandering river that drains part of the Altai Mountains into western Mongolia's Khoton Lake south of the Biluut Hills. It runs through a sheltered valley of rugged grassland used by nomads for pasturing.
