= Khoton Lake =

Lake in Bayan-Ölgii Province, Mongolia

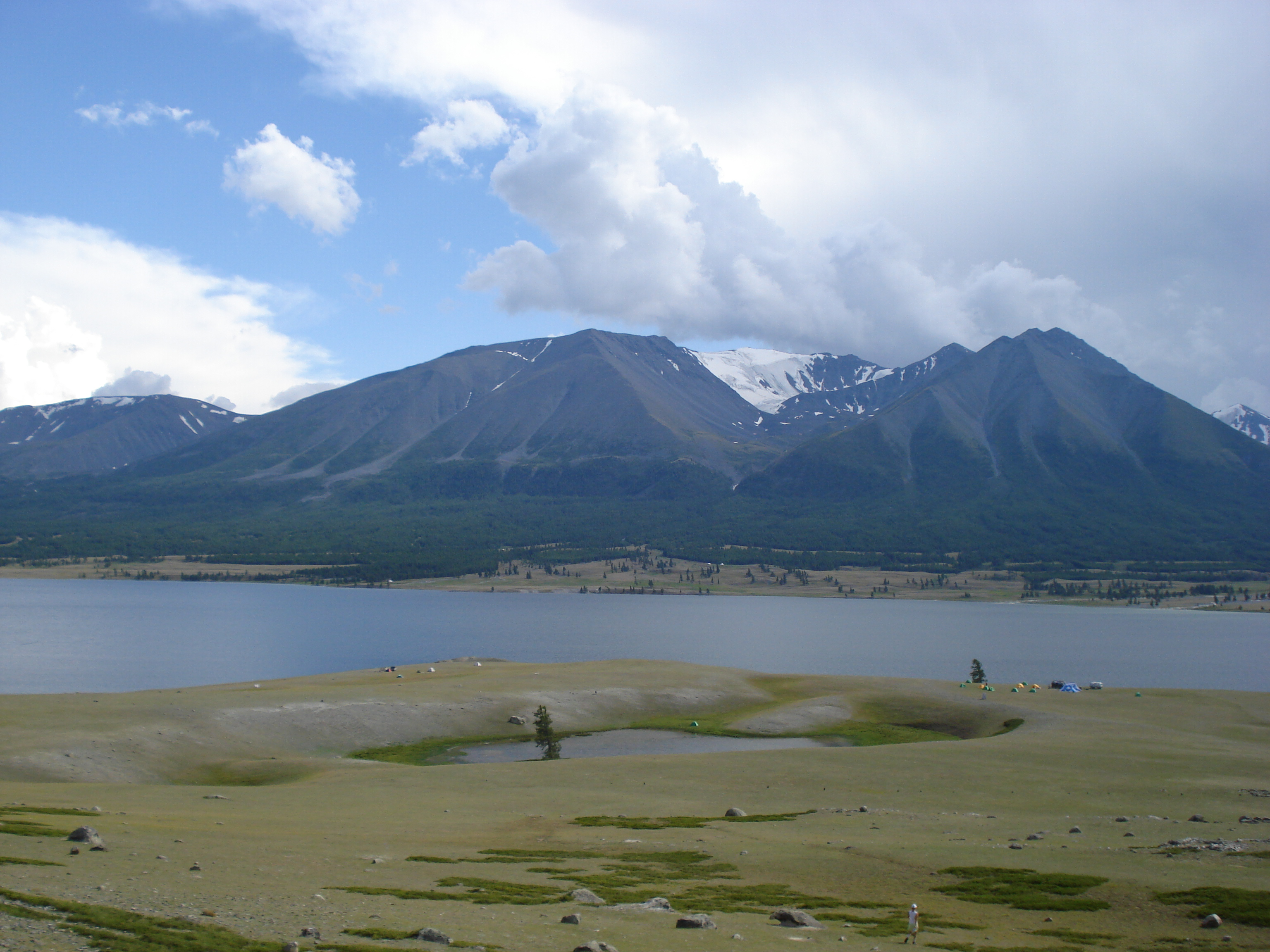

- Location within Mongolia
- Location: Altai Tavan Bogd National Park, Bayan-Ölgii Province, Mongolia
- Coordinates: 48°39′N 88°18′E
- Primary inflows: Khuiten River
- Surface area: 50 square kilometres (19 sq mi)
- Max. depth: 8.58 metres (28.1 ft)
- Surface elevation: 2,000 metres (6,600 ft)

Khoton Lake (Mongolian: Хотон нуур ᠬᠣᠲᠤᠩ ᠨᠠᠭᠤᠷ [qotuŋ naɣur], ) is a freshwater lake in Altai Tavan Bogd National Park in Tsengel District, Bayan-Ölgii Province, western Mongolia.

== Geography ==
It lies at the foot of the Altai Mountains near the Chinese border, at an elevation of about 2,000 metres (6,600 ft) above sea level. It is fed by the Khuiten River from the east and other rivers from the north. With an area of 50 square kilometres (19 sq mi), it is the country's twenty-sixth largest lake by surface area. It has a maximum depth of 8.58 metres (28.1 ft). The lake is home to abundant fish life.

== Architecture ==
A camping site lies in the southern side of the lake.
