= Xinjiang under Qing rule =

Aspect of Chinese history

- Military governorate later province of the Qing dynasty
- 1759–1912
- Xinjiang within the Qing dynasty in 1820
- Division of currency circulation zones before the 1860s, roughly corresponding to Hui-region (south) and Zhun-region (north)
- Capital: Ili (c. 1762–1871); Dihua (1884–1912)
- Government
  - Type: Qing hierarchy
- History
  - Established: 1759
  - Dungan revolt: 1862–1877
  - Conversion into province: 1884
  - Disestablished: 1912
Preceded by	Succeeded by
Dzungar Khanate	Xinjiang Province, Republic of China

The Manchu-led Qing dynasty of China ruled over Xinjiang from the late 1750s to 1912. In the history of Xinjiang, the Qing rule was established in the final phase of the Dzungar–Qing Wars when the Dzungar Khanate was conquered by the Qing dynasty, and lasted until the fall of the Qing dynasty in 1912. The post of General of Ili was established to govern the whole of Xinjiang and reported to the Lifan Yuan, a Qing government agency that oversaw the empire's frontier regions. Xinjiang was turned into a province in 1884.

== Terminology ==
=== Xinjiang ===
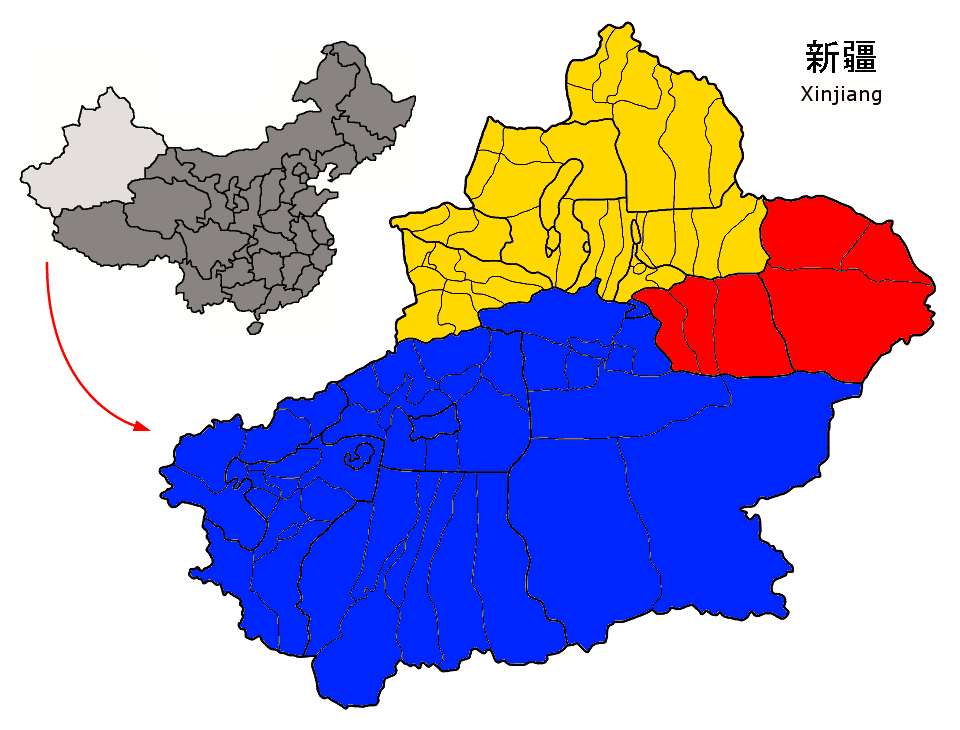
The three regions of Xinjiang under the Qing dynasty: Zhunbu (north), Huibu (south), and Donglu (east)

The name "Xinjiang" (Chinese: 新疆; pinyin: Xīnjiāng; lit. 'new frontier') was introduced during the reign of the Qianlong Emperor (r. 1735–1796) as "Xiyu Xinjiang" (Chinese: 西域新疆; pinyin: Xīyù Xīnjiāng; lit. 'new frontier of the Western Regions'). Xinjiang became the common designation for the region under the General of Ili Songyun in the late 18th century. It was split between Zhunbu (Dzungaria) in the north, also known as Tianshan Beilu (Northern March), Huibu (Muslim Region) in the south, also known as Tianshan Nanlu (Southern March) or Huijiang (Muslim frontier), and Tianshan Donglu (Eastern March) in the east, also known as "Little Suzhou-Hangzhou" for its large number of merchants. In European and Central Asian sources, southern Xinjiang has been called the Tarim Basin (after the river), Chinese Turkestan, Bukharia, Little Bukharia, Kashgaria, and East Turkestan. The Uyghur word for southern Xinjiang is Altishahr, which means "six cities", but "four cities" (Dorben shahr) or "seven cities" (Yeti shahr) have also been used.

=== Uyghur ===
There was no unified ethnonym for the people now known as the Uyghurs during the Qing period. Prior to the Qing, the term "Uyghur" had been used to refer to non-Muslim inhabitants of Qocho, mainly Buddhists, who resisted conversion to Islam until the 16th century. The term fell out of use afterward and was not used to refer to the modern Uyghur people until 1921. Prior to this, the oasis inhabitants of Xinjiang were called Sart by both Chinese and foreigners. Sart originally meant "merchant" and was used by Turkic and Mongolic speaking groups to refer to Iranian people they ruled over. In the post-Mongol Empire Central Asia, Sart meant sedentary. Foreigners also called them Tartars. The Chinese called the oasis peoples chantou, meaning "turban head," but this was used for the modern Hui people (Dungan people) in Xinjiang as well. Huihu (Uyghur) was used in 1779 by the Qing to refer to rebel leaders in Xinjiang. However the Qing did not draw any specific connection between the Huihu and oasis peoples but with Chinese-speaking Muslims and Xinjiang Muslims in general, both of whom were called Hui. In northern Xinjiang they were known as Taranchi, a Mongolian term for "farmer", because they were relocated from the oases to northern Xinjiang by the Dzungar Khanate as bondservants.

The locals identified as inhabitants of their cities, such as Kashgaris, Khotanese, Kucheans, and so on. They used Musulman to distinguish themselves from the non-Muslim population and the Dungans. They were also often referred as Chagatayan, due to the fact that these people were descended from the Chagatai Khanate and wrote the language from such. Muslim oasis dwellers could also refer to anyone Muslim as locals.

=== Dungan ===
Chinese-speaking Muslims in the northwest were called the Dungans, transcribed as Tungan, Dungan, or Donggan. They were also called hanhui in Qing documents; the Oghuz-speaking Salars were also sometimes referred as Dungans. The oasis peoples of Xinjiang referred to themselves as Musulman to distinguish themselves from the Dungans.

== Background ==
=== Dzungar-Qing wars ===
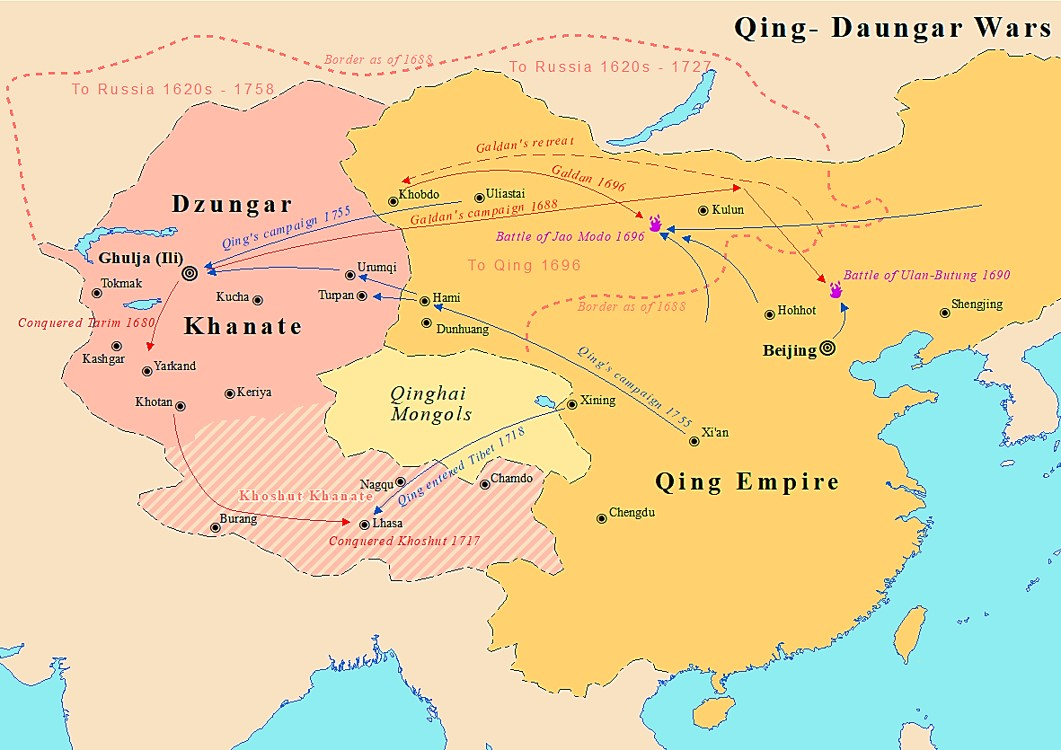
Map showing the Dzungar–Qing Wars between the Qing dynasty and Dzungar Khanate

Prior to Qing rule, Xinjiang was ruled by the Oirat Mongols of the Dzungar Khanate based in northern Xinjiang, an area known as Dzungaria. The Dzungars lived in an area from the west end of the Great Wall of China to present-day eastern Kazakhstan and from present-day northern Kyrgyzstan to southern Siberia (most of which is located in present-day Xinjiang). They were the last nomadic empire to threaten China, waging war on the Qing dynasty and their subjects in the middle of the 18th century.

In 1680, the Dzungars conquered the Tarim Basin, then ruled by the Yarkent Khanate under the influence of the Muslim Khojas. In 1690, the Dzungars attacked the Qing dynasty at the Battle of Ulan Butung and were forced to retreat. In 1696, the Dzungar ruler Galdan Khan was defeated by the Qing at the Battle of Jao Modo. From 1693 to 1696, the Tarim Basin khans rebelled against the Dzungars, resulting in the defection of Abdullah Tarkhan Beg of Hami to the Qing. In 1717, the Dzungars invaded Tibet, then under the control of a Qing ally, Lha-bzang Khan of the Khoshut Khanate. The Qing retaliated the next year with an invasion force but was defeated at the Battle of the Salween River. A second and larger Qing expedition was sent in 1720 and successfully defeated the Dzungars, expelling them from Tibet. The people of Turpan and Pichan took advantage of the situation to rebel under a local chief, Emin Khoja, and defected to the Qing. The Dzungars then attacked the Khalka Mongols subject to the Qing, resulting in another Qing expedition that was defeated by the Dzungars near Khoton Lake. In 1730, the Dzungars attacked Turpan, forcing Emin Khoja to retreat and settle in Guazhou. A succession dispute in 1745 caused widespread rebellion in the Dzungar Khanate. While the Dzungar nobles Dawachi and Amursana fought for control over the khanate, the Dörbet and Bayad defected to the Qing in 1753. The next year, Amursana also defected while the rulers in Khotan and Aksu rebelled against Dzungar rule. In 1755, a Qing army invaded the Dzungar Khanate and met with practically no resistance, ending Dzungar rule in the span of a hundred days. Dawachi attempted to flee but was captured by Khojis, the beg of Uchturpan, and delivered to the Qing.

After defeating the Dzungar Khanate, the Qing planned to install khans for each of the four Oirat tribes, but Amursana wanted to rule over all the Oirats. Instead the Qianlong Emperor made him only khan of the Khoid. In the summer, Amursana and another Mongol leader, Chingünjav, led a revolt against the Qing. Unable to defeat the Qing, Amursana fled north to seek refuge with the Russians two years later and died of smallpox in Russian lands. In the spring of 1762 his frozen body was brought to Kyakhta for the Manchu to see. The Russians then buried it, refusing the Manchu request that it be handed over for posthumous punishment.

When Amursana rebelled, the Aq Taghliq khojas Burhanuddin and Jahan rebelled in Yarkand. Their rule was not popular and the people greatly disliked them for appropriating anything they needed from clothing to livestock. In February 1758, The Qing sent Yaerhashan and Zhao Hui with 10,000 troops against the Aq Taghliq regime. Zhao Hui was besieged by enemy forces at Yarkand until January 1759, but otherwise the Qing army did not encounter any difficulties on campaign. The khoja brothers fled to Badakhshan where they were captured by the ruler Sultan Shah, who executed them and handed Jahan's head to the Qing. The Tarim Basin was pacified in 1759.

=== Dzungar genocide ===
The Qianlong Emperor issued the following orders, as translated by Peter C. Perdue:

"Show no mercy at all to these rebels. Only the old and weak should be saved. Our previous military campaigns were too lenient. If we act as before, our troops will withdraw, and further trouble will occur. If a rebel is captured and his followers wish to surrender, he must personally come to the garrison, prostrate himself before the commander, and request surrender. If he only sends someone to request submission, it is undoubtedly a trick. Tell Tsengünjav to massacre these crafty Zunghars. Do not believe what they say."

Deaths in the Dzungar genocide are estimated at between 70 and 80 percent of the 600,000 or more Dzungars, who were destroyed by disease and warfare between 1755 and 1758, which Michael Clarke describes as "the complete destruction of not only the Dzungar state but of the Dzungars as a people." According to the Qing scholar Wei Yuan (1794–1857), the Dzungar population before the Qing conquest was around 600,000 in 200,000 households. Wei Yuan wrote that about 40 percent of the Dzungar households were killed by smallpox, 20 percent fled to Russia or Kazakh tribes, and 30 percent were killed by Manchu bannermen. Khalkha Mongols and Salars also participated in the killing. For several thousands of li, there were no gers except of those who had surrendered. According to Russian accounts, all the men, women and children of the Dzungars were slaughtered by the Manchu troops. The population of Dzungaria would not rebound for several generations.

The destruction of the Dzungars has been attributed to an explicit policy of extermination, described as "ethnic genocide", by the Qianlong Emperor which lasted for two years. He ordered the massacre of the majority of the Dzungar population and the enslavement or banishment of the remainder, resulting in the destruction of the Dzungars. The Encyclopedia of Genocide and Crimes Against Humanity classifies the Qianlong Emperor's actions against the Dzungars as genocide under the definition given by the United Nations Convention on the Prevention and Punishment of the Crime of Genocide. The Emperor saw no conflict between his order of extermination and upholding the peaceful principles of Confucianism. He supported his position by portraying the Dzungars as barbarians and subhuman. The Qianlong Emperor proclaimed that "to sweep away barbarians is the way to bring stability to the interior", that the Dzungars "turned their back on civilization", and "Heaven supported the emperor," in their destruction.

His commanders were reluctant to carry out his orders, which he repeated several times using the term jiao (extermination) over and over again. The commanders Hadaha and Agui were punished for only occupying Dzungar lands but letting the people escape. The generals Jaohui and Shuhede were punished for not showing sufficient zeal in exterminating rebels. Others such as Tangkelu were rewarded for their participation in the slaughter. Qianlong explicitly ordered the Khalkha Mongols to "take the young and strong and massacre them." The elderly, children, and women were spared but they could not preserve their former names or titles. Loyalist Khalkhas received Dzungar Khoit women as slaves from Chebudengzhabu, and orders to deprive the starving Dzungars of food were issued. Manchu Bannermen and loyalist Mongols received Dzungar women, children, and old men as bondservants, and their Dzungar identity was wiped out. Mark Levene, a historian whose recent research interests focus on genocide, states that the extermination of the Dzungars was "arguably the eighteenth century genocide par excellence."

==== Genocide of Kazakh and Kyrgyz nomads ====
Despite the Qing policies mainly targeted the Dzungars, the Turkic Kipchak Kazakhs and Kyrgyz were also targeted as well. Since both Kazakhs and Kyrgyz share very little in common with the Uyghurs (who were descended from the Karluks) despite being Muslims, and far more commons with the Dzungars for being Borjigin nomads, the Qing Chinese force couldn't reliably distinguish Kazakhs and Kyrgyz from Dzungars. As for the result, Kazakhs and Kyrgyz were also slaughtered en masse by the Qing force and their Uyghur, Salar and Hui allies as they all looked alike.

Because of the genocide, the relations between Qing China and Kazakh Khanate deteriorated rapidly, as Amursana, who rebelled against the Qing rulers, was married into the family of Kazakh Khan Ablai. Subsequently, Qing officials considered Kazakh Khanate as complicit, before launching the invasion of Kazakh Khanate, triggering the First Sino–Kazakh War.

==== Anti-Dzungar Uyghur rebels ====
The Dzungars had conquered and subjugated the Uyghurs after being invited by the Afaqi Khoja to invade. Heavy taxes were imposed upon the Uyghurs by the Dzungars, with women and refreshments provided by the Uyghurs to the tax collectors. Uyghur women were allegedly gang raped by the tax collectors when the amount of tax was not satisfactory.

Anti-Dzungar Uyghur rebels from the Turfan and Hami oases submitted to Qing rule as vassals and requested Qing help for overthrowing Dzungar rule. Uyghur leaders like Emin Khoja were granted titles within the Qing nobility, and these Uyghurs helped supply the Qing military forces during the anti-Dzungar campaign. The Qing employed Khoja Emin in its campaign against the Dzungars and used him as an intermediary with Muslims from the Tarim Basin, to inform them that the Qing only sought to kill Oirats (Dzungars), and that they would leave the Muslims alone. To convince them to kill the Dzungars themselves and side with the Qing, the Qing noted the Uyghur Muslims' resentment of their former Dzungar rulers at the hands of Tsewang Rabtan.

==== Demographic changes ====
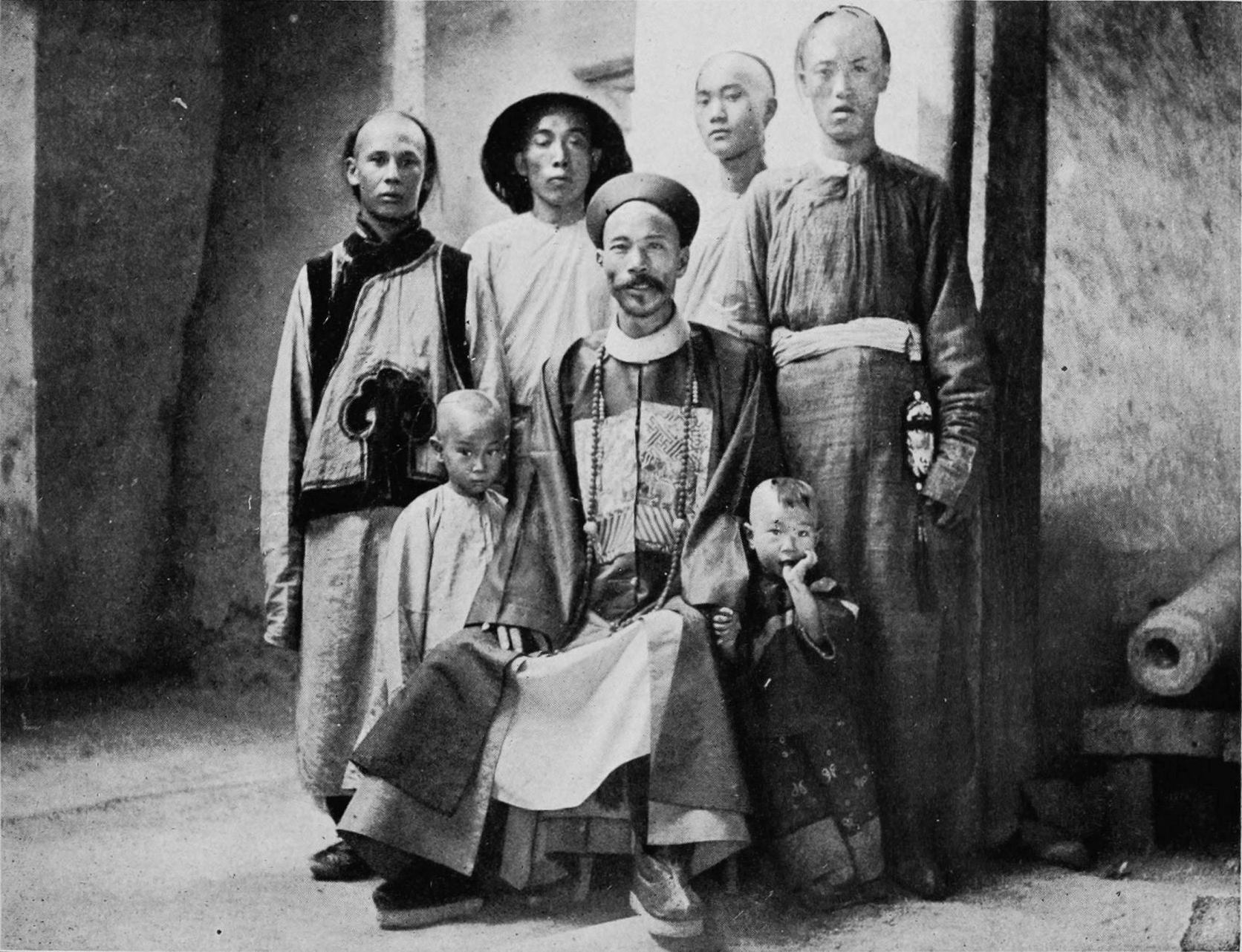
T'ang Ta-Jên, military Amban of Khotan, with his children and attendants

The Qing genocide against the Dzungars, as well as its mass slaughter of Kazakhs and Kyrgyz, depopulated northern Xinjiang. The Qing sponsored the settlement of millions of ethnic Han Chinese, Hui, Central Asian oasis people (Uyghurs and Uzbeks), Salar and Manchu Bannermen in Dzungaria. Professor Stanley W. Toops noted that today's demographic situation is similar to that of the early Qing period in Xinjiang. In northern Xinjiang, the Qing brought in Han, Hui, Uyghur, Xibe, Salar, and Manchu colonists after they exterminated the Dzungar Oirat Mongols in the region. As a result of these demographic changes, Xinjiang during the Qing period was made up of 62 percent Uyghurs concentrated in the south, 30 percent Han and Hui in the north, and 8 percent various other minorities.

Xinjiang, as a unified, defined geographic identity, was created and developed by the Qing. In Dzungaria, the Qing established new cities like Ürümqi and Yining. After the Qing defeated Jahangir Khoja in the 1820s, 12,000 Uyghur Taranchi families were deported by the Qing from the Tarim Basin to Dzungaria to colonize and repopulate the area. The depopulation of northern Xinjiang led to the Qing settling Manchu, Sibo (Xibe), Daurs, Solons, Han Chinese, Hui Muslims, Salar, and Muslim Taranchis in the north, with Han Chinese and Hui migrants making up the greatest number of settlers. The Dzungarian basin, which used to be inhabited by Dzungars, is currently inhabited by Kazakhs and Kyrgyz (who happened to be also minorities relative to Uyghurs and Hans), mostly around Ili and Kizilsu, though a small portion of Dzungar Oirat descendants still persist to even today, mainly around Bortala and Bayingholin.

Since the crushing of the Buddhist Öölöd (Dzungars) by the Qing led to promotion of Islam and the empowerment of the Muslim Begs in southern Xinjiang, and migration of Muslim Taranchis/Chagatayans to northern Xinjiang, it was proposed by Henry Schwarz that "the Qing victory was, in a certain sense, a victory for Islam," although the genocide of Muslim Kazakh and Kyrgyz nomads at the hand of the same Chinese force and the Uyghur rebels (as they could not differentiate between Kazakhs and Kyrgyz from Dzungars) have led to questions over if this is even a victory for Islam overall. It was Qing rule that led to the predominance of Islam in the region, which increased after the defeat of the Buddhist Dzungars. The Qing tolerated or even promoted Muslim culture and identity, at least for strategic manipulation of the Uyghurs for a time being. The Qing gave the name Xinjiang to Dzungaria after conquering it, with 1 million mu (17,000 acres) being turned from steppe grassland to farmland from 1760 to 1820 by the new colonies of Han Chinese agriculturalists.

While some have tried to represent Qing actions such as the creation of settlements and state farms as an anti-Uyghur plot to replace them in their land in light of the contemporary situation in Xinjiang with Han migration, James A. Millward points out that the Qing agricultural colonies had nothing to do with Uyghurs and their land. The Qing actually banned the settlement of Han Chinese in the Uyghur populated Tarim Basin oases area, and in fact, directed Han settlers instead to settle in the non-Uyghur Dzungaria and the new city of Ürümqi. Of the state farms settled with 155,000 Han Chinese from 1760 to 1830, all were in Dzungaria and Ürümqi, where only an insignificant amount of Uyghurs lived.

== History ==
=== Qing rule (1759–1862) ===
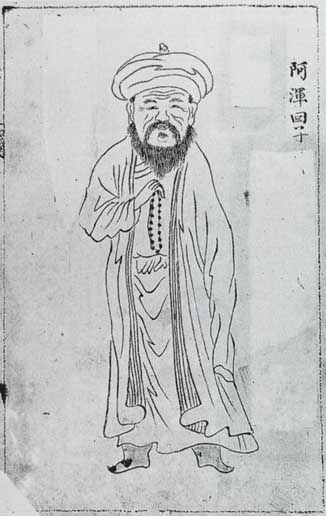
Painting depicting a Turkic Muslim from Altishahr, during the reign of the Qing dynasty.

The Qing identified their state as Zhongguo ("中國", the term for "China" in modern Chinese), and referred to it as "Dulimbai Gurun" in Manchu. The Qianlong Emperor explicitly commemorated the Qing conquest of the Dzungars as having added new territory in Xinjiang to "China", defining China as a multi-ethnic state, rejecting the idea that China only meant Han areas in "China proper", meaning that according to the Qing, both Han and non-Han peoples were part of "China", which included Xinjiang which the Qing conquered from the Dzungars. After the Qing were done conquering Dzungaria in 1759, they proclaimed that the new land which formerly belonged to the Dzungars, was now absorbed into "China" (Dulimbai Gurun) in a Manchu language memorial. The Qing expounded on their ideology to convey the idea of "unification" of the different peoples to their state. Xinjiang people were not allowed to be called foreigners (yi) under the Qing.

Qianlong Emperor rejected the views of Han officials who said Xinjiang was not part of China and that he should not conquer it, putting forth the view that China was multi-ethnic and did not just refer to Han. Han migration to Xinjiang was permitted by the Manchu Qianlong Emperor, who also gave Chinese names to cities to replace their Mongol names, instituting civil service exams in the area, and implementing the county and prefecture Chinese style administrative system, and promoting Han migration to Xinjiang to solidify Qing control was supported by numerous Manchu officials under Qianlong. A proposal was written in The Imperial Gazetteer of the Western Regions (Xiyu tuzhi) to use state-funded schools to promote Confucianism among Muslims in Xinjiang by Fuheng and his team of Manchu officials and the Qianlong Emperor. Confucian names were given to towns and cities in Xinjiang by the Qianlong Emperor, like "Dihua" for Urumqi in 1760 and Changji, Fengqing, Fukang, Huifu, and Suilai for other cities in Xinjiang, Qianlong also implemented Chinese style prefectures, departments, and counties in a portion of the region.

Qianlong compared his achievements with that of the Han and Tang ventures into Central Asia. Qianlong's conquest of Xinjiang was driven by his mindfulness of the examples set by the Han and Tang. Qing scholars who wrote the official Imperial Qing gazetteer for Xinjiang made frequent references to the Han and Tang era names of the region. The Qing conqueror of Xinjiang, Zhao Hui, is ranked for his achievements with the Tang dynasty General Gao Xianzhi and the Han dynasty Generals Ban Chao and Li Guangli. Both aspects of the Han and Tang models for ruling Xinjiang were adopted by the Qing and the Qing system also superficially resembled that of nomadic powers like the Qara Khitay, but in reality the Qing system was different from that of the nomads, both in terms of territory conquered geographically and their centralized administrative system, resembling a western stye (European and Russian) system of rule. The Qing portrayed their conquest of Xinjiang in officials works as a continuation and restoration of the Han and Tang accomplishments in the region, mentioning the previous achievements of those dynasties. The Qing justified their conquest by claiming that the Han and Tang era borders were being restored, and identifying the Han and Tang's grandeur and authority with the Qing. Many Manchu and Mongol Qing writers who wrote about Xinjiang did so in the Chinese language, from a culturally Chinese point of view. Han and Tang era stories about Xinjiang were recounted and ancient Chinese places names were reused and circulated. Han and Tang era records and accounts of Xinjiang were the only writings on the region available to Qing era Chinese in the 18th century and needed to be replaced with updated accounts by the literati.

The Qing Empire ca. 1820, with provinces in yellow, military governorates and protectorates in green, tributary states in orange.

==== Settlement policies ====
After Qing dynasty defeated the Dzungar Oirat Mongols and exterminated them from their native land of Dzungaria in the genocide, the Qing settled Han, Hui, Manchus, Xibe, and Taranchis (Uyghurs) from the Tarim Basin, into Dzungaria. Han Chinese criminals and political exiles were exiled to Dzhungaria, such as Lin Zexu. Chinese Hui Muslims and Salar Muslims belonging to banned Sufi orders like the Jahriyya were also exiled to Dzhungaria as well. In the aftermath of the crushing of the 1781 Jahriyya rebellion, Jahriyya adherents were exiled.

The Qing enacted different policies for different areas of Xinjiang. Han and Hui migrants were urged by the Qing government to settle in Dzungaria in northern Xinjiang, while they were not allowed in southern Xinjiang's Tarim Basin oases with the exception of Han and Hui merchants. In areas where more Han Chinese settled like in Dzungaria, the Qing used a Chinese style administrative system.

The Manchu Qing ordered the settlement of thousands of Han Chinese peasants in Xinijiang after 1760, the peasants originally came from Gansu and were given animals, seeds, and tools as they were being settled in the area, for the purpose of making China's rule in the region permanent and a fait accompli.

Taranchi was the name for Turki (Uyghur) agriculturalists who were resettled in Dzhungaria from the Tarim Basin oases ("East Turkestani cities") by the Qing dynasty, along with Manchus, Xibo (Xibe), Solons, Han and other ethnic groups in the aftermath of the destruction of the Dzhunghars. Kulja (Ghulja) was a key area subjected to the Qing settlement of these different ethnic groups into military colonies. The Manchu garrisons were supplied and supported with grain cultivated by the Han soldiers and East Turkestani (Uyghurs) who were resettled in agricultural colonies in Dzungaria. The Manchu Qing policy of settling Chinese colonists and Taranchis from the Tarim Basin on the former Kalmucks (Dzungar) land was described as having the land "swarmed" with the settlers. The number of Uyghurs moved by the Qing from Altä-shähär (Tarim Basin) to depopulated Dzungar land in Ili numbered around 10,000 families. The number of Uyghurs moved by the Qing into Jungharia (Dzungaria) at this time has been described as "large". The Qing settled in Dzungaria even more Turki-Taranchi (Uyghurs) numbering around 12,000 families originating from Kashgar in the aftermath of the Jahangir Khoja invasion in the 1820s. Standard Uyghur is based on the Taranchi dialect, which was chosen by the Chinese government for this role. Salar migrants from Amdo (Qinghai) came to settle the region as religious exiles, migrants, and as soldiers enlisted in the Chinese army to fight in Ili, often following the Hui.

After a revolt by the Xibe in Qiqihar in 1764, the Qianlong Emperor ordered an 800-man military escort to transfer 18,000 Xibe to the Ili valley of Dzungaria in Xinjiang. In Ili, the Xinjiang Xibe built Buddhist monasteries and cultivated vegetables, tobacco, and poppies. One punishment for Bannermen for their misdeeds involved them being exiled to Xinjiang.

In 1765, 300,000 ch'ing of land in Xinjiang were turned into military colonies, as Chinese settlement expanded to keep up with China's population growth.

The Qing resorted to incentives like issuing a subsidy which was paid to Han who were willing to migrate to northwest to Xinjiang, in a 1776 edict. There were very little Uyghurs in Urumqi during the Qing dynasty, Urumqi was mostly Han and Hui, and Han and Hui settlers were concentrated in Northern Xinjiang (Beilu aka Dzungaria). Around 155,000 Han and Hui lived in Xinjiang, mostly in Dzungaria around 1803, and around 320,000 Uyghurs, living mostly in Southern Xinjiang (the Tarim Basin), as Han and Hui were allowed to settle in Dzungaria but forbidden to settle in the Tarim, while the small number of Uyghurs living in Dzungaria and Urumqi was insignificant. Hans were around one third of Xinjiang's population at 1800, during the time of the Qing dynasty. Spirits (alcohol) were introduced during the settlement of northern Xinjiang by Han Chinese flooding into the area. The Qing made a special case in allowing northern Xinjiang to be settled by Han, since they usually did not allow frontier regions to be settled by Han migrants. This policy led to 200,000 Han and Hui settlers in northern Xinjiang when the 18th century came to a close, in addition to military colonies settled by Han called Bingtun.

Professor of Chinese and Central Asian History at Georgetown University, James A. Millward wrote that foreigners often mistakenly think that Urumqi was originally a Uyghur city and that the Chinese destroyed its Uyghur character and culture, however, Urumqi was founded as a Chinese city by Han and Hui (Tungans), and it is the Uyghurs who are new to the city.

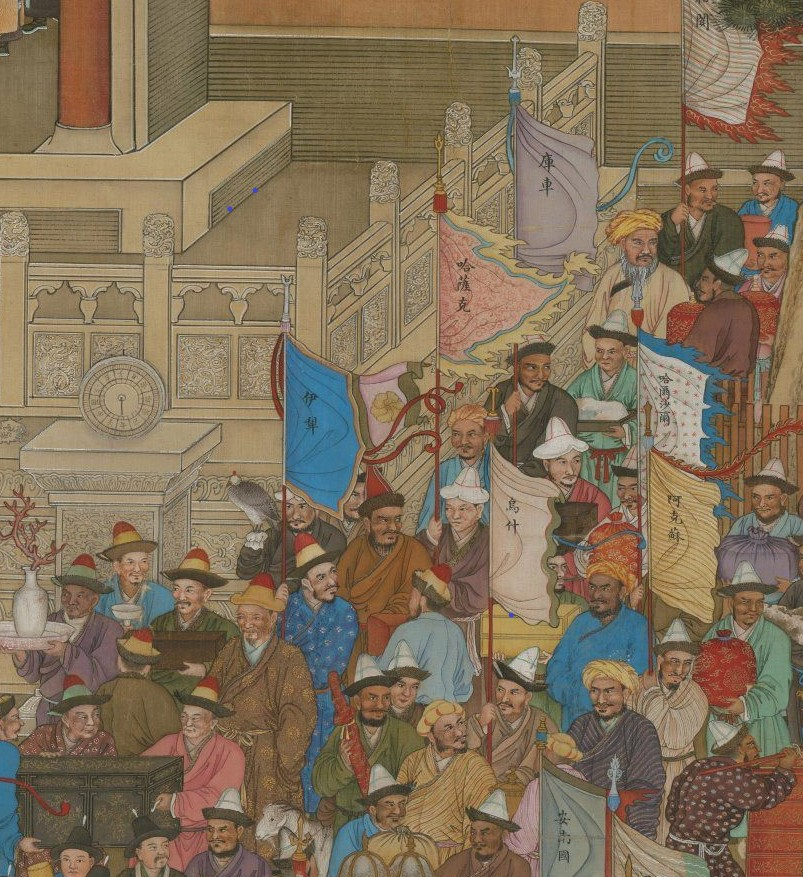
Delegations of the nations of Kuche (庫車), Qarashahr (哈爾沙爾), Aksu (阿克蘇), Uqturpan (烏什), Ili (伊犁) and Kazakh Khanate (哈薩克) during annual tributary visit to Beijing as depicted in Qing dynasty court painting Wan Guo Lai Chao Tu (萬國來朝圖)

While a few people try to give a misportrayal of the historical Qing situation in light of the contemporary situation in Xinjiang with Han migration, and claim that the Qing settlements and state farms were an anti-Uyghur plot to replace them in their land, Professor James A. Millward pointed out that the Qing agricultural colonies in reality had nothing to do with Uyghur and their land, since the Qing banned settlement of Han in the Uyghur Tarim Basin and in fact directed the Han settlers instead to settle in the non-Uyghur Dzungaria and the new city of Urumqi, so that the state farms which were settled with 155,000 Han Chinese from 1760 to 1830 were all in Dzungaria and Urumqi, where there was only an insignificant number of Uyghurs, instead of the Tarim Basin oases.

Han and Hui merchants were initially only allowed to trade in the Tarim Basin, while Han and Hui settlement in the Tarim Basin was banned, until the Muhammad Yusuf Khoja invasion, in 1830 when the Qing rewarded the merchants for fighting off Khoja by allowing them to settle down. Robert Michell noted that as of 1870, there were many Chinese of all occupations living in Dzungaria and they were well settled in the area, while in Turkestan (Tarim Basin) there were only a few Chinese merchants and soldiers in several garrisons among the Muslim population.

The Qing dynasty gave large amounts of land to Chinese Hui Muslims and Han Chinese who settled in Dzungaria, while Turkic Muslim Taranchis were also moved into Dzungaria in the Ili region from Aqsu in 1760, the population of the Tarim Basin swelled to twice its original size during Qing rule for 60 years since the start, No permanent settlement was allowed in the Tarim Basin, with only merchants and soldiers being allowed to stay temporarily, up into the 1830s after Jahangir's invasion and Altishahr was open to Han Chinese and Hui (Tungan) colonization, the 19th century rebellions caused the population of Han to drop, the name "Eastern Turkestan" was used for the area consisting of Uyghuristan (Turfan and Hami) in the northeast and Altishahr/Kashgaria in the southwest, with various estimates given by foreign visitors on the entire region's population- At the start of Qing rule, the population was concentrated more towards Kucha's western region with around 260,000 people living in Altishahr, with 300,000 living at the start of the 19th century, one tenth of them lived in Uyghuristan in the east while Kashgaria had seven tenths of the population.

==== Population ====
Around 1,200,000 people lived in Kashgaria according to Kuropatkin at the close of the 19th century, while 1,015,000 people lived in Kashgaria according to Forsyth. 2.5 million was the population guessed by Grennard.

At the start of the 19th century, 40 years after the Qing reconquest, there were around 155,000 Han and Hui Chinese in northern Xinjiang and somewhat more than twice that number of Uyghurs in southern Xinjiang. A census of Xinjiang under Qing rule in the early 19th century tabulated ethnic shares of the population as 30% Han and 60% Turkic, while it dramatically shifted to 6% Han and 75% Uyghur in the 1953 census, however a situation similar to the Qing era-demographics with a large number of Han has been restored as of 2000 with 40.57% Han and 45.21% Uyghur. Professor Stanley W. Toops noted that today's demographic situation is similar to that of the early Qing period in Xinjiang. Before 1831, only a few hundred Chinese merchants lived in southern Xinjiang oases (Tarim Basin) and only a few Uyghurs lived in northern Xinjiang (Dzungaria).

=== Kalmyk Oirats return ===
The Oirat Mongol Kalmyk Khanate was founded in the 17th century with Tibetan Buddhism as its main religion, following the earlier migration of the Oirats from Dzungaria through Central Asia to the steppe around the mouth of the Volga River. During the course of the 18th century, they were absorbed by the Russian Empire, which was then expanding to the south and east. The Russian Orthodox church pressured many Kalmyks to adopt Orthodoxy. In the winter of 1770–1771, about 300,000 Kalmyks set out to return to China. Their goal was to retake control of Dzungaria from the Qing dynasty. Along the way many were attacked and killed by Kazakhs and Kyrgyz, their historical enemies based on intertribal competition for land, and many more died of starvation and disease. After several grueling months of travel, only one-third of the original group reached Dzungaria and had no choice but to surrender to the Qing upon arrival. These Kalmyks became known as Oirat Torghut Mongols. After being settled in Qing territory, the Torghuts were coerced by the Qing into giving up their nomadic lifestyle and to take up sedentary agriculture instead as part of a deliberate policy by the Qing to enfeeble them. They proved to be incompetent farmers and they became destitute, selling their children into slavery, engaging in prostitution, and stealing, according to the Manchu Qi-yi-shi. Child slaves were in demand on the Central Asian slave market, and Torghut children were sold into this slave trade.

=== Ush rebellion ===
The Ush rebellion in 1765 by Uyghurs against the Manchus occurred after Uyghur women were gang raped by the servants and son of Manchu official Su-cheng. It was said that Ush Muslims had long wanted to sleep on [Sucheng and son's] hides and eat their flesh. because of the rape of Uyghur Muslim women for months by the Manchu official Sucheng and his son. The Manchu Emperor ordered that the Uyghur rebel town be massacred, the Qing forces enslaved all the Uyghur children and women and slaughtered the Uyghur men. Manchu soldiers and Manchu officials regularly having sex with or raping Uyghur women caused massive hatred and anger by Uyghur Muslims to Manchu rule. The invasion by Jahangir Khoja was preceded by another Qing official, Binjing, who extorted bribes on a massive scale and raped a Muslim daughter of the Kokan aqsaqal from 1818 to 1820. The Qing sought to cover up the extent of Binjing's activities so as to not incite revolt against the dynasty.

=== Kokandi attacks ===
Dungan revolt
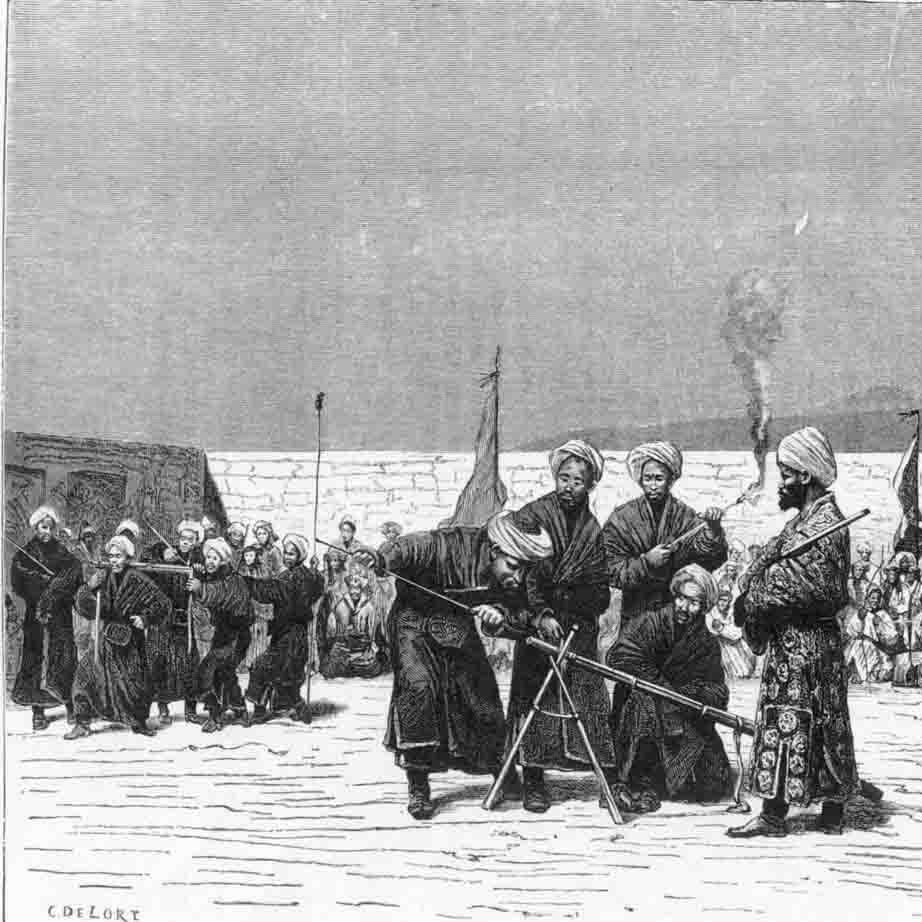
- Shooting exercises of the Taifurchis
Date	1862-77
Location	Xinjiang
Result	Qing victory

Belligerents
Qing dynasty Hui Muslim loyalists Khufiyya order under Ma Zhan'ao in Gansu (1872–77) Eleven Gedimu Battalions of Shaanxi (1872–77): Cui Wei's battalion (1872–1877); Hua Dacai's battalion (1872–1877)	Kashgaria (Kokandi Uzbek Andijanis under Yaqub Beg) Supported by: Ottoman Empire Taranchi Turkic Muslim rebels in Ili	Hui Muslim rebels

Commanders and leaders
	Yaqub Beg; Hsu Hsuehkung	T'o Ming (Tuo Ming, aka Daud Khalifa)

Strength
Qing troops	Turkic Muslim rebels, Andijani Uzbek troops and Afghan volunteers, Han Chinese and Hui forcibly drafted into Yaqub's army, and separate Han Chinese militia	Hui Muslim rebels

The Afaqi Khojas living in the Kokand Khanate, descended from Khoja Burhanuddin, tried invading Kashgar and reconquering Altishahr from the rule of the Qing dynasty during the Afaqi Khoja revolts.

In 1827, southern part of Xinjiang was retaken by former ruler's descendant Jihangir Khojah; Chang-lung, the Chinese general of Hi, recovered possession of Kashgar and the other revolted cities in 1828. A revolt in 1829 under Mohammed AH Khan and Yusuf, brother of Jahangir Khoja, was more successful, and resulted in the concession of several important trade privileges to the district of Alty Shahr (the "six cities").

Hui merchants fought for the Qing in Kashgar in 1826 against Turkic Muslim rebels led by the Khoja Jahangir

The Muslim (Afaqi) Khojas and Kokands were resisted by both the Qing army and the Hui Muslim (Tungan) merchants, who had no problems battling their coreligionists. Among those who died in battle in 1826 against Jahangir Khoja's forces was the Hui Zhang Mingtang who led the merchant militia of Kashgar.

During the 1826 invasion Jahangir Khoja's forces took six Hui Muslims as slaves, Nian Dengxi, Liu Qifeng, Wu Erqi, Ma Tianxi, Tian Guan, and Li Shengzhao, and sold them off in Central Asia, they escaped and fled back to China via Russia.

When the Khojas attacked in 1830 and 1826 against Yarkand and Kashgar, Hui Muslim (Tungan) merchant militia fought them off and Hui Muslims were also part of the Qing Green Standard Army.

Ishaqi (Black Mountain) Khoja followers helped the Qing oppose Jahangir Khoja's Afaqi (White Mountain) Khoja faction.

The Black Mountain Khoja followers (Qarataghliks) supported the Qing against the White Mountain (Aqtaghlik) Khoja invasions. The Qing-Black Mountain Khoja alliance helped bring down Jahangir Khoja's White Mountain rule.

Chinese rule in Xinjiang was supported by the Black Mountain Qarataghlik Turkic Muslims and they were called "Khitai-parast" (China worshippers, or "followers of China") and were based in Artush, while the White Mountain Aqtaghlik Khojas were against China, were called "sayyid parast" (sayyid worshippers or "sayyid-followers") and were based in Kucha, were guided by "Turkic nationalism", the Qarataghliks did not say bismillah before cutting up and eating melons, while the Aqtaghliks said bismillah before eating and cutting melons, and there was no intermarriage between the two parties which were strongly opposed to each other. There was no marriage between adherents of the Artish located pro-Qing Black Mountain and the Kucha located anti-Qing White Mountain sects.

Ishaqi followers mounted opposition to Jahangir Khoja's Kokandi backed forces and the Ishaqis helped Qing loyalists. Ishaqi followers started opposition to the "debauchery" and "pillage" caused by the Afaqi rule under Jahangir Khoja and allied with Qing loyalists to oppose Jahangir.

In the Kokandi invasion and Jahangir's invasion, the Qing were assisted by the "Black Hat Muslims" (the Ishaqiyya) against the Afaqiyya.

The Kokandis planted false information that the local Turkic Muslims were plotting with them in the invasion and this reached the ears of the Chinese merchants in Kashgar.

Yarkand was placed under siege by the Kokandis, and the Chinese merchants and Qing military declined to come out in open battle, instead taking cover inside fortifications and slaughtered the Kokandi troops using guns and cannons and the local Turkic Muslims of Yarkand helped the Qing capture or drive off the remaining Kokandis with some of the prisoners being executed after capture.

The Aksakal was the representative of Kokand posted in Kashgar after the Qing and Kokand signed the treaty ending the conflict.

The Kokandi supported Jahangir Khoja of the White Mountain faction first launched his attack on the Qing in 1825 and slaughtered Chinese civilians and the tiny Chinese military force as he attacked Kashgar, in addition to killing the Turki Muslim pro-Chinese governor of Kashgar, he took Kashgar in 1826. In Ili the Chinese responded by calling up a massive army of northern and eastern steppe nomads and Hui Muslims (Dongans) numbering 80,000 to fight Jahangir. Jahangir brought his 50,000 strong army to fight them at Maralbashi, the two armies began the fight by challenging other to a duel in "single combat" between two champions in their armies. A Khokandi (Kokandi) who used a rifle and sword was the champion of Jahangir while a Calmac (Kalmyk) archer was the champion of the Chinese, the Calmac killed the Khokandi with an arrow and the two armies then confronted each other in battle, the Chinese army butchering Jahangir's army which tried to flee from the scene. Jahangir scrammed and hid out but was turned over to the Chinese by the Kyrgyz and he was tortured and put to death, Yusuf, Jahangir's brother, invaded the Qing in 1830 and besieged Kashgar. The Uyghur Muslim Sayyid and Naqshbandi Sufi rebel of the Afaqi suborder, Jahangir Khoja was sliced to death (Lingchi) in 1828 by the Manchus for leading a rebellion against the Qing. The Kokandis pulled back and retreated from the siege while Turkis were massacred in the city. The Chinese used 3,000 criminals to help crush the "Revolt of the Seven Khojas" broke out in 1846, and the local Turki Muslims refused to help the khojas because the Chinese supporting Muslims had their daughters and wives abducted by the Khojas. Wali Khan, who was reputed for his brutality and tyranny, let a rebellion in 185 and began by attacking Kashgar. Chinese were massacred and the daughters and wives of the subordinates of the loyalist Turki governor were seized. Adolphe Schlagintweit, a German, was executed by beheading by Wali Khan and his head put on display. Wali Khan was infamous for his cruelty and if courtiers "raised their eyes" to him he would murder them, when the call to prayer was made by a muezzin and his voice was too loud the muezzin was murdered by Wali Khan. A 12,000 strong Chinese army crushed and defeated the 20,000 strong army of Wali Khan in 77 days of combat. Wali Khan was abandoned by his "allies" due to his cruelty. The Chinese inflicted harsh reprisals upon Wali Khan's forces and had his son and father in law executed in harsh manners.

Until 1846 the country enjoyed peace under the just and liberal rule of Zahir-ud-din, the Uyghur governor, but in that year a fresh Khojah revolt under Kath Tora led to his making himself master of the city, with circumstances of unbridled license and oppression. His reign was, however, brief, for at the end of seventy-five days, on the approach of the Chinese, he fled back to Khokand amid the jeers of the inhabitants. The last of the Khojah revolts (1857) was of about equal duration with the previous one, and took place under Wali-Khan. The great Tungani revolt, or insurrection of the Chinese Muslims, which broke out in 1862 in Gansu, spread rapidly to Dzungaria and through the line of towns in the Tarim Basin. The Tungani troops in Yarkand rose, and (10 August 1863) massacred some seven thousand Chinese, while the inhabitants of Kashgar, rising in their turn against their masters, invoked the aid of Sadik Beg, a Kyrgyz chief, who was reinforced by Buzurg Khan, the heir of Jahanghir, and Yakub Beg, his general, these being despatched at Sadik's request by the ruler of Khokand to raise what troops they could to aid Muslims in Kashgar. Sadik Beg soon repented of having asked for a Khojah, and eventually marched against Kashgar, which by this time had succumbed to Buzurg Khan and Yakub Beg, but was defeated and driven back to Khokand. Buzurg Khan delivered himself up to indolence and debauchery, but Yakub Beg, with singular energy and perseverance, made himself master of Yangi Shahr, Yangi-Hissar, Yarkand, and other towns, and eventually declared himself the Amir of Kashgaria.

Yakub Beg ruled at the height of The Great Game era when the British, Russians, and Manchu Qing empires were all vying for influence in Central Asia. Kashgaria extended from the capital Kashgar in south-western Xinjiang to Ürümqi, Turfan, and Hami in central and eastern Xinjiang more than a thousand kilometers to the north-east, including a majority of what was known at the time as East Turkestan. Some territories surrounding the Lake Balkhash in northwestern Xinjiang were already ceded by the Qing to the Russians in the 1864 Treaty of Tarbagatai.

Kashgar and the other cities of the Tarim Basin remained under Yakub Beg's rule until December 1877, when the Qing reconquered most of Xinjiang. Yaqub Beg and his Turkic Uyghur Muslims also declared a Jihad against Chinese Muslims in Xinjiang. Yaqub Beg went as far as to enlist Han Chinese to help fight against Chinese Muslim forces during the Battle of Ürümqi (1870). Turkic Muslims also massacred Chinese Muslims in Ili.

=== Qing reconquest of Xinjiang ===
Yakub Beg's rule lasted until Qing General Zuo Zongtang (also known as General Tso) reconquered the region in 1877 for the Qing. The Qing reconquered Xinjiang with the help of Hui Muslims like the Khuffiya Sufi leader and Dungan (Hui) General Ma Anliang, and the Gedimu leaders Hua Dacai and Cui Wei. As Zuo Zongtang moved into Xinjiang to crush the Muslim rebels under Yaqub Beg, he was joined by Ma Anliang and his forces, which were composed entirely out of Muslim Dungan people. Ma Anliang and his Dungan troops fought alongside Zuo Zongtang to attack the Muslim rebel forces. General Dong Fuxiang's army seized the Kashgaria and Khotan area. In addition, General Dong Fuxiang had an army of both Hans and Dungan people, and his army took Khotan. Finally, the Qing recovered the Gulja region through diplomatic negotiations and the Treaty of Saint Petersburg in 1881.

Zuo Zongtang, previously a general in the Xiang Army, was the commander in chief of all Qing troops participating in this counterinsurgency. His subordinates were the Han Chinese General Liu Jintang and Manchu Jin Shun. Liu Jintang's army had modern German artillery, which Jin Shun's forces lacked and neither was Jin's advance as rapid as Liu's. After Liu bombarded Ku-mu-ti, Muslim rebel casualties numbered 6,000 dead while Bai Yanhu was forced to flee for his life. Thereafter Qing forces entered Ürümqi unopposed. Dabancheng was destroyed by Liu's forces in April. Yaqub's subordinates defected to the Qing or fled as his forces started to fall apart. The oasis fell easily to the Qing troops. Toksun fell to Liu's army on April 26.

The mass retreat of the rebel army shrank their sphere of control smaller and smaller. Yaqub Beg lost more than 20,000 men either though desertion or at the hands of the enemy. At Turfan, Yakub Beg was trapped between two armies advancing from Urumqi and Pidjam, and if defeated his line of retreat would be greatly exposed to an enterprising enemy. In October, Jin Shun resumed his forward movement and encountered no serious opposition. The Northern Army under the immediate command of Zuo Zongtang operated in complete secrecy. General Zuo appeared before the walls of Aksu, the bulwark of Kashgaria on the east, and its commandant abandoned his post at the first onset. Qing army then advanced on Uqturpan, which also surrendered without a blow. Early in December all Qing troops began their last attack against the capital city of the Kashgarian regime, and on December 17 the Qing army made a fatal assault. The rebel troops were finally defeated and the residual troops started to withdraw to Yarkant, whence they fled to Russian territory. With the fall of Kashgaria Qing's reconquest of Xinjiang was completed. No further rebellion was encountered, and the reestablished Qing authorities began the task of recovery and reorganization.

=== Xinjiang province (1884–1911) ===
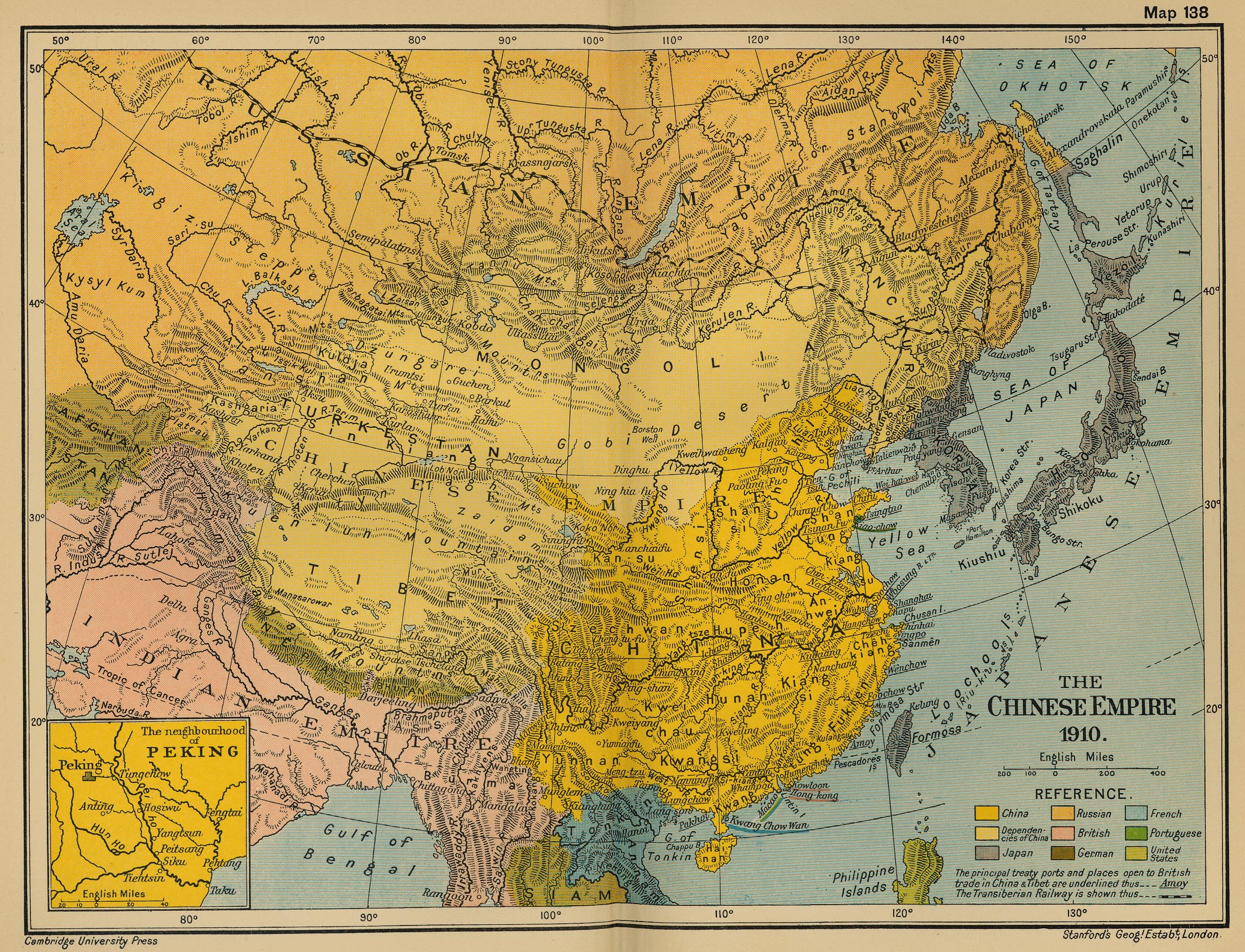
The Qing Empire in 1910 with provinces in deep yellow, military governorates and protectorates in light yellow.

In 1884, Qing China renamed the conquered region, established Xinjiang ("new frontier") as a province, formally applying onto it the political system of China proper. The name "Xinjiang" had officially replaced old historical names such as the "Western Regions", "Chinese Turkestan", "Eastern Turkestan", "Uyghuristan", "Kashgaria", "Uyghuria", "Alter Sheher" and "Yetti Sheher".

The two separate regions, Dzungaria, known as Zhunbu (準部, Dzungar region) or Tianshan Beilu (天山北路, Northern March), and the Tarim Basin, which had been known as Altishahr, Huibu (Muslim region), Huijiang (Muslim-land) or "Tianshan Nanlu (天山南路, southern March), were combined into a single province called Xinjiang by in 1884. Before this, there was never one administrative unit in which North Xinjiang (Zhunbu) and Southern Xinjiang (Huibu) were integrated together.

A lot of the Han Chinese and Chinese Hui Muslim population who had previously settled northern Xinjiang (Dzungaria) after the Qing genocide of the Dzungars, had died in the Dungan Revolt (1862–1877). As a result, new Uyghur colonists from Southern Xinjiang (the Tarim Basin) proceeded to settle in the newly empty lands and spread across all of Xinjiang.

After Xinjiang was converted into a province by the Qing, the provincialisation and reconstruction programs initiated by the Qing resulted in the Chinese government helping Uyghurs migrate from southern Xinjiang to other areas of the province, like the area between Qitai and the capital, which was formerly nearly completely inhabited by Han Chinese, and other areas like Urumqi, Tacheng (Tabarghatai), Yili, Jinghe, Kur Kara Usu, Ruoqiang, Lop Nor, and the Tarim River's lower reaches. It was during Qing times that Uyghurs were settled throughout all of Xinjiang, from their original home cities in the western Tarim Basin. The Qing policies after they created Xinjiang by uniting Dzungaria and Altishahr (Tarim Basin) led Uyghurs to believe that all of the Xinjiang province was their homeland, since the annihilation of the Dzungars by the Qing, populating the Ili valley with Uyghurs from the Tarim Basin, creating one political unit with a single name (Xinjiang) out of the previously separate Dzungaria and the Tarim Basin, the war from 1864 to 1878 which led to the killing of much of the original Han Chinese and Chinese Hui Muslims in Xinjiang, led to areas in Xinjiang which previously had insignificant numbers of Uyghurs, like the southeast, east, and north, to then become settled by Uyghurs who spread through all of Xinjiang from their original home in the southwest area. There was a major and fast growth of the Uyghur population, while the original population of Han Chinese and Hui Muslims from before the war of 155,000 dropped, to the much lower population of 33,114 Tungans (Hui) and 66,000 Han.

A regionalist style nationalism was fostered by the Han Chinese officials who came to rule Xinjiang after its conversion into a province by the Qing, it was from this ideology that the later East Turkestani nationalists appropriated their sense of nationalism centered around Xinjiang as a clearly defined geographic territory.

The British and Russian consuls engaged in counterintelligence against one another at Kashgar during The Great Game.

In August 1902, a magnitude 7.7 earthquake devastated Kashgar and Artux. About 10,000 people died and 30,000 homes were destroyed. The disaster led to the Qing government relieving taxes and providing compensation to the victims.

Qing rule of Xinjiang ended with the 1911 Revolution in Xinjiang that took place in Ili and the fall of the dynasty.

==== List of governors ====
- Liu Jintang (Liu Chin-t'ang) 刘锦棠 1884–1889
- Wei Guangtao Wei Kuang-tao 魏光燾
- Wen Shilin 溫世霖 wēn shì lín
- Yuan Dahua 袁大化 (succeeded after the end of the Qing dynasty by Yang Zengxin)

== Administrative divisions ==
In 1759, the Qing dynasty suppressed the Revolt of the Altishahr Khojas and began its rule over southern Xinjiang, implementing the beg system alongside the military-administrative system. Later, the descendants of the Great Khoja, such as Khoja Yusup and Jahangir Khoja (邁瑪特玉素普), repeatedly returned from abroad to incite uprisings.

Before Qing rule, the Hui region had been under the violent domination of the Dzungar Khanate. The destruction of the Dzungars led to the complete Islamization of Xinjiang and parts of Central Asia (including all of present-day Kyrgyzstan, parts of Tajikistan and Uzbekistan, and eastern Kazakhstan). Previously, the ruling Dzungar Mongols had universally practiced Tibetan Buddhism.

In 1762, the Qing established the office of the General of Ili, who exercised unified military and civil authority over all regions north and south of the Tianshan Mountains.

Administrative Divisions of Xinjiang in 1820

In 1865, Yaqub Beg of the Khanate of Kokand invaded Kashgar, Aksu, Dihua (present-day Ürümqi), and other areas. In 1876, the Governor-General of Shaanxi and Gansu, Zuo Zongtang, led government troops westward from Gansu, entered Dihua in July, and captured Hotan the following January, recovering most of Xinjiang. In 1881, Ili was taken back from Russia.

In 1884, Zuo Zongtang memorialized the throne to establish Xinjiang Province, to be administered under the jurisdiction of the Governor-General of Shaanxi and Gansu, with its administrative center moved from Ili to Dihua. Upon its establishment, Xinjiang Province was divided into four daos (circuits): Zhendidao, Aksudao, Kashgardaо, and Yitadao.

By the end of the Qing dynasty, the traditional beg system had been abolished. The province comprised the following:

- six fus (prefectures): Dihua, Ili, Yanqi, Wensu, Shule, and Shache
- seven directly-administered tings: Turpan, Jinghe, Yingjisha, Tarbagatai, Kurkarusu (庫爾哈喇烏蘇), Hami, and Zhenxi (鎮西)
- three directly-administered zhous: Kuqa, Wushi (烏什), and Hotan

== Society ==
=== Temporary marriage ===
There were eras in Xinjiang's history where intermarriage was common, "laxity" which set upon Uyghur women led them to marry Chinese men and not wear the veil in the period after Yaqub Beg's rule ended, it is also believed by Uyghurs that some Uyghurs have Han Chinese ancestry from historical intermarriage, such as those living in Turpan.

Even though Muslim women are forbidden to marry non-Muslims in Islamic law, from 1880 to 1949 it was frequently violated in Xinjiang since Chinese men married Muslim Turki (Uyghur) women, a reason suggested by foreigners that it was due to the women being poor, while the Turki women who married Chinese were labelled as whores by the Turki community, these marriages were illegitimate according to Islamic law but the women obtained benefits from marrying Chinese men since the Chinese defended them from Islamic authorities so the women were not subjected to the tax on prostitution and were able to save their income for themselves. Chinese men gave their Turki wives privileges which Turki men's wives did not have, since the wives of Chinese did not have to wear a veil and a Chinese man in Kashgar once beat a mullah who tried to force his Turki Kashgari wife to veil. The Turki women also benefited in that they were not subjected to any legal binding to their Chinese husbands so they could make their Chinese husbands provide them with as much their money as she wanted for her relatives and herself since otherwise the women could just leave, and the property of Chinese men was left to their Turki wives after they died. Islamic cemeteries banned the Turki wives of Chinese men from being buried within them, the Turki women got around this problem by giving shrines donations and buying a grave in other towns. Besides Chinese men, other men such as Hindus, Armenians, Jews, Russians and Badakhshanis intermarried with local Turki women. The local society accepted the Turki women and Chinese men's mixed offspring as their own people despite the marriages being in violation of Islamic law. Turki women also conducted temporary marriages with Chinese men such as Chinese soldiers temporarily stationed around them as soldiers for tours of duty, after which the Chinese men returned to their own cities, with the Chinese men selling their mixed daughters with the Turki women to his comrades, taking their sons with them if they could afford it but leaving them if they couldn't, and selling their temporary Turki wife to a comrade or leaving her behind. The basic formalities of normal marriages were maintained as a facade even in temporary marriages. Prostitution by Turki women due to the buying of daughters from impoverished families and divorced women was recorded by Scotsman George Hunter. Mullahs officiated temporary marriages and both the divorce and the marriage proceedings were undertaken by the mullah at the same ceremony if the marriage was only to last for a certain arranged time and there was a temporary marriage bazaar in Yangi Hissar according to Nazaroff. Islamic law was being violated by the temporary marriages which particularly violated Sunni Islam.

Valikhanov claimed that foreigners children in Turkistan were referred to by the name çalğurt. Turki women were bashed as of being negative character by a Kashgari Turki woman's Tibetan husband- racist views of each other's ethnicities between partners in interethnic marriages still persisted sometimes. It was mostly Turki women marrying foreign men with a few cases of the opposite occurring in this era.

Andijani (Kokandi) Turkic Muslim merchants (from modern Uzbekistan), who shared the same religion, a similar culture, cuisine, clothing, and phenotypes with the Altishahri Uyghurs, frequently married local Altishahri women and the name "chalgurt" was applied to their mixed race daughters and sons, the daughters were left behind with their Uyghur Altishahri mothers while the sons were taken by the Kokandi fathers when they returned to their homeland.

The Qing banned Khoqandi merchants from marrying Kashgari women. Due to 'group jealously' disputes broke out due to Chinese and Turki crossing both religious and ethnic differences and engaging and sex. Turki locals viewed fellow Turkic Muslim Andijanis also as competitors for their own women. A Turki proverb said Do not let a man from Andijan into your house.

Turki women were able to inherit the property of their Chinese husbands after they died.

In Xinjiang temporary marriage, marriage de convenance, called "waqitliq toy" in Turki, was one of the prevalent forms of polygamy, "the mulla who performs the ceremony arranging for the divorce at the same time", with women and men marrying for a fixed period of time for several days are a week. While temporary marriage was banned in Russian Turkestan, Chinese ruled Xinjiang permitted the temporary marriage where it was widespread.

Chinese merchants and soldiers, foreigners like Russians, foreign Muslims and other Turki merchants all engaged in temporary marriages with Turki women, since a lot of foreigners lived in Yarkand, temporary marriage flourished there more than it did towards areas with fewer foreigners like areas towards Kucha's east.

Childless, married youthful women were called "chaucan" in Turki, and Forsyth mission participant Dr. Bellew said that "there was the chaucan always ready to contract an alliance for a long or short period with the merchant or traveller visiting the country or with anybody else". Henry Lansdell wrote in 1893 in his book Chinese Central Asia an account of temporary marriage practiced by a Turki Muslim woman, who married three different Chinese officers and a Muslim official. The station of prostitutes was accorded by society to these Muslim women who had sex with Chinese men.

Turkic Muslims in different areas of Xinjiang held derogatory views of each other such as claiming that Chinese men were welcomed by the loose Yamçi girls.

Intermarriage and patronage of prostitutes were among the forms of interaction between the Turki in Xinjiang and visiting Chinese merchants.

Le Coq reported that in his time sometimes Turkis distrusted Tungans (Hui Muslims) more than Han Chinese, so that a Tungan would never be given a Turki woman in marriage by her father, while a (Han) Chinese men could be given a Turki woman in marriage by her father.

Many of the young Kashgari women were most attractive in appearance, and some of the little girls quite lovely, their plaits of long hair falling from under a jaunty little embroidered cap, their big dark eyes, flashing teeth and piquant olive faces reminding me of Italian or Spanish children. One most beautiful boy stands out in my memory. He was clad in a new shirt and trousers of flowered pink, his crimson velvet cap embroidered with gold, and as he smiled and salaamed to us I thought he looked like a fairy prince. The women wear their hair in two or five plaits much thickened and lengthened by the addition of yak's hair, but the children in several tiny plaits.

The peasants are fairly well off, as the soil is rich, the abundant water-supply free, and the taxation comparatively light. It was always interesting to meet them taking their live stock into market. Flocks of sheep with tiny lambs, black and white, pattered along the dusty road; here a goat followed its master like a dog, trotting behind the diminutive ass which the farmer bestrode; or boys, clad in the whity-brown native cloth, shouted incessantly at donkeys almost invisible under enormous loads of forage, or carried fowls and ducks in bunches head downwards, a sight that always made me long to come to the rescue of the luckless birds.

It was pleasant to see the women riding alone on horseback, managing their mounts to perfection. They formed a sharp contrast to their Persian sisters, who either sit behind their husbands or have their steeds led by the bridle; and instead of keeping silence in public, as is the rule for the shrouded women of Iran, these farmers' wives chaffered and haggled with the men in the bazar outside the city, transacting business with their veils thrown back.

Certainly the mullas do their best to keep the fair sex in their place, and are in the habit of beating those who show their faces in the Great Bazar. But I was told that poetic justice had lately been meted out to one of these upholders of the law of Islam, for by mistake he chastised a Kashgari woman married to a Chinaman, whereupon the irate husband set upon him with a big stick and castigated him soundly.

Almost every Chinaman in Yarkand, soldier or civilian, takes unto himself a temporary wife, dispensing entirely with the services of the clergy, as being superfluous, and most of the high officials also give way to the same amiable weakness, their mistresses being in almost all cases natives of Khotan, which city enjoys the unenviable distinction of supplying every large city in Turkestan with courtesans.

When a Chinaman is called back to his own home in China proper, or a Chinese soldier has served his time in Turkestan and has to return to his native city of Pekin or Shanghai, he either leaves his temporary wife behind to shift for herself, or he sells her to a friend. If he has a family he takes the boys with him~—if he can afford it—failing that, the sons are left alone and unprotected to fight the battle of life, While in the case of daughters, he sells them to one of his former companions for a trifling sum.

The natives, although all Mahammadans, have a strong predilection for the Chinese, and seem to like their manners and customs, and never seem to resent this behaviour to their womankind, their own manners, customs, and morals (?) being of the very loosest description.

That a Muslim should take in marriage one of alien faith is not objected to; it is rather deemed a meritorious act thus to bring an unbeliever to the true religion. The Muslim woman, on the other hand, must not be given in marriage to a non-Muslim; such a union is regarded as the most heinous of sins. In this matter, however, compromises are sometimes made with heaven: the marriage of a Turki princess with the emperor Ch'ien-lung has already been referred to; and, when the present writer passed through Minjol (a day's journey west of Kashgar) in 1902, a Chinese with a Turki wife (? concubine) was presented to him.

He procured me a Chinese interpreter, Fong Shi, a pleasant and agreeable young Chinaman, who wrote his mother-tongue with ease and spoke Jagatai Turki fluently, and—did not smoke opium. He left his wife and child behind him in Khotan, Liu Darin making himself answerable for their maintenance. But I also paid Fong Shi three months' salary in advance, and that money he gave to his wife. Whenever I could find leisure he was to give me lessons in Chinese, and we began at once, even before we left Khotan........... Thus the young Chinaman's proud dream of one day riding through the gates of Peking and beholding the palace (yamen) of his fabulously mighty emperor, as well as of perhaps securing, through my recommendation, a lucrative post, and finally, though by no means last in his estimation, of exchanging the Turki wife he had left behind in Khotan for a Chinese bride—this proud dream was pricked at the foot of Arka-tagh. Sadly and silently he stood alone in the desert, gazing after us, as we continued our way towards the far-distant goal of his youthful ambition.

Uyghur prostitutes were encountered by Carl Gustaf Emil Mannerheim who wrote they were especially to be found in Khotan. He commented on "venereal diseases".

While Uyghur Muslim women were oppressed, by comparison Han Chinese women were free and few of them bothered to become maids unlike Uyghur Muslim women. The lack of Han Chinese women led to Uyghur Muslim women marrying Han Chinese men. These women were hated by their families and other Uyghurs. The Uighur Muslims viewed single unmarried women as prostitutes and held them in extreme disregard. Child marriages for girls was very common and the Uyghurs called girls "overripe" if they were not married by 15 or 16 years old. Four wives were allowed along with any number of temporary marriages contracted by Mullahs to "pleasure wives" for a set time period. Some had 60 and 35 wives. Divorces and marrying was rampant with marriages and divorces being conducted by Mullahs simultaneously and some men married hundreds and could divorce women for no reason. Wives were forced to stay in the house and had to be obedient to their husbands and were judged according to how much children they could bear. Unmarried Muslim Uyghur women married non-Muslims like Chinese, Hindus, Armenians, Jews, and Russians if they could not find a Muslim husband while they were calling to Allah to grant them marriage by the shrines of saints. Unmarried women were viewed as whores and many children were born with venereal diseases because of these temporary marriages. The birth of a girl was seen as a terrible calamity by the local Uighur Muslims and boys were worth more to them. The constant stream of marriage and divorces led to children being mistreated by stepparents. A Swedish missionary said "These girls were surely the first girls in Eastern Turkestan who had had a real youth before getting married. The Muslim woman has no youth. Directly from childhood's carefree playing of games she enters life's bitter everyday toil… She is but a child and a wife." The marriage of 9 year old Aisha to the Muhammad was cited by Uyghur Muslims to justify marrying girl children, whom they viewed as mere products. The Muslims also attacked the Swedish Christian mission and Hindus resident in the city.

Xiang Army and other Han Chinese male soldiers and sojourners bought Turki Musulman (Uyghur) girls as wives from their parents after Zuo Zongtang's reconquest of Xinjiang, and the Han and Uyghurs often relied on Hui intermediaries to translate and broker the marriages. A Han Chinese man with the surname Li bought a young Uyghur men from two Uyghur men who kidnapped her in 1880. They were employed by the magistrate of Pichan. A Turpan Uyghur girl named Ruo-zang-le who was 12 was sold for 30 taels in 1889 in Qitai to a young Han Chinese Shanxi man named Liu Yun. She became pregnant with his child in 1892. Han Chinese men viewed the toyluq they paid in silver for their Uyghur brides as a bride price. Uyghur Muslim women married Han Chinese men in Xinjiang in the late 19th and early 20th centuries. Han Chinese men, Hindu men, Armenian men, Jewish men and Russian men were married by Uyghur Muslim women who could not find husbands. Uyghur merchants would harass Hindu usurers by screaming at them asking them if they ate beef or hanging cow skins on their quarters. Uyghur men also rioted and attacked Hindus for marrying Uyghur women in 1907 in Poskam and Yarkand like Ditta Ram calling for their beheading and stoning as they engaged in anti-Hindu violence. Hindu Indian usurers engaging in a religious procession led to violence against them by Muslim Uyghurs. In 1896 two Uyghur Turkis attacked a Hindu merchant and the British consul Macartney demanded the Uyghurs be punished by flogging.

=== Women ===
Among Uyghurs it was thought that God designed women to endure hardship and work, the word for "helpless one", ʿājiza, was used to call women who were not married while women who were married were called mazlūm among Turkic Muslims in Xinjiang, however, divorce and remarriage was facile for the women The modern Uyghur dialect in Turfan uses the Arabic word for oppressed, maẓlum, to refer to "married old woman" and pronounce it as mäzim. Woman were normally referred to as "oppressed person" (mazlum-kishi), 13 or 12 years old was the age of marriage for women in Khotan, Yarkand, and Kashgar. Robert Barkley Shaw wrote that * Mazlúm, lit. "oppressed one," is used in Káshghar, &c., instead of the word "woman." A woman's robe was referred to as mazlúm-cha chappan. Women were used for reproduction, sex, and housework.

There was a very minimum female marriage age. Marriage age for girls was 10 years old and for boys, 12 years old. Before puberty commenced child marriages were practiced with both boys and girls. Cousin marriages were practiced by the wealthy. There was no marriage between adherents of the pro-China Black Mountain in Artish and the anti-China White Mountain sects in Kucha. The label of "overripe" was placed on girls who were between the ages of 14 and 16 so girls were married off far younger with girl as young as age 8, which marked the time when husbands were sought out as suitable matches by parents. The high number of "child marriages" at an extreme young age led to high divorce rates. Sometimes men aged 50 or 40 took young girls as brides in marriages set up by parents and this was criticized by the Uyghur Christian Nur Luke, who abandoned Islam. It was demanded that married girls be confined to the house. Marriages were arranged and arbitrated over due to financial and religious obligations from both parties. Less complicated arrangements were made for widows and divorcees who wanted to marry again. Public shaming was arranged for adulterers. Ceremonies were held after the birth of a child.

=== Turki-Russian clash quelled by the Qing ===
An anti-Russian uproar broke out when Russian customs officials, three Cossacks and a Russian courier invited local Turki Muslim prostitutes to a party in January 1902 in Kashgar. This caused a massive brawl between the local Turki Muslim populace and the Russians with the purpose of protecting Muslim women from prostitution which is viewed as a grotesque moral degradation from an Islamic perspective. This led the local Turki Muslims and the Russians to clash with one another before they were dispersed. The Chinese sought to end to tensions with the purpose of preventing the Russians from using this as a pretext to invade them.

After the riot, the Russians sent troops to Sarikol in Tashkurghan and demanded that the Sarikol postal services be placed under Russian supervision. The locals of Sarikol believed that the Russians would seize the entire district from the Chinese and send more soldiers even after the Russians tried to negotiate with the Begs of Sarikol and sway them to their side. They failed since the Sarikoli officials and authorities demanded in a petition to the Amban of Yarkand that they be evacuated to Yarkand to avoid being harassed by the Russians. They also objected to the Russian presence in Sarikol, as the Sarikolis did not believe Russian claims that they would leave them alone and were only involved in mail service.

== See also ==
- Qing dynasty in Inner Asia
- Manchuria under Qing rule
- Mongolia under Qing rule
- Tibet under Qing rule
- Taiwan under Qing rule
- History of Xinjiang
- Chinese Turkestan
- Western Regions
- Protectorate of the Western Regions
- Protectorate General to Pacify the West
