= Gan Daying Migration =

Gan Daying migration（Chinese：赶大营） refers to a historical phenomenon in the late Qing dynasty, in which inland merchant groups—represented by traders from Yangliuqing in Tianjin—followed the Qing army led by Zuo Zongtang during the westward campaign to Xinjiang, entering the northwestern regions to engage in military supply trade and gradually settling there. This process broadly lasted from the late nineteenth century to the early twentieth century, spanning approximately sixty to seventy years, and constitutes one of the larger-scale waves of civilian migration and commercial development in China’s modern northwestern frontier regions.

== History ==
In the mid-nineteenth century, the situation in China’s northwestern frontier was highly unstable. In the fourth year of the Tongzhi reign (1865), Yakub Beg of Yettishar, a military leader from the Yettishar, invaded Xinjiang and established a regime there. In the first year of the Guangxu reign (1875), the Qing court appointed Zuo Zongtang as Imperial Commissioner to oversee military affairs in Xinjiang. He subsequently launched a westward campaign, which ultimately led to the Qing reconquest of Xinjiang.

At the same time, northern China was plagued by frequent natural disasters, heavy conscription burdens, and widespread livelihood difficulties in Tianjin and its surrounding areas, particularly in Yangliuqing. To address the logistical challenges faced by the expeditionary forces, the Qing government permitted and encouraged inland merchants and civilians to accompany the army and engage in trade to supply military provisions. Against this backdrop, large numbers of merchants from Yangliuqing migrated westward along the army’s route. Because they advanced in close succession with the Qing military camps, this movement came to be known as the “Gan Daying” (literally “following the main camp”), also referred to as “Gan Xi Daying” (“following the western main camp”). Folk artworks, represented by Yangliuqing New Year pictures, were consequently exported to Xinjiang as part of this process.
