= Yettishar =

1865–1877 Turkic state centred around Kashgar

Yettishar یته شهر خانلیگی (Chagatay) يەتتەشەھەر خانلىقى (Uyghur) Yettesheher Khanliqi (ULY)
- 1864–1877
- Flag (1873–1877)

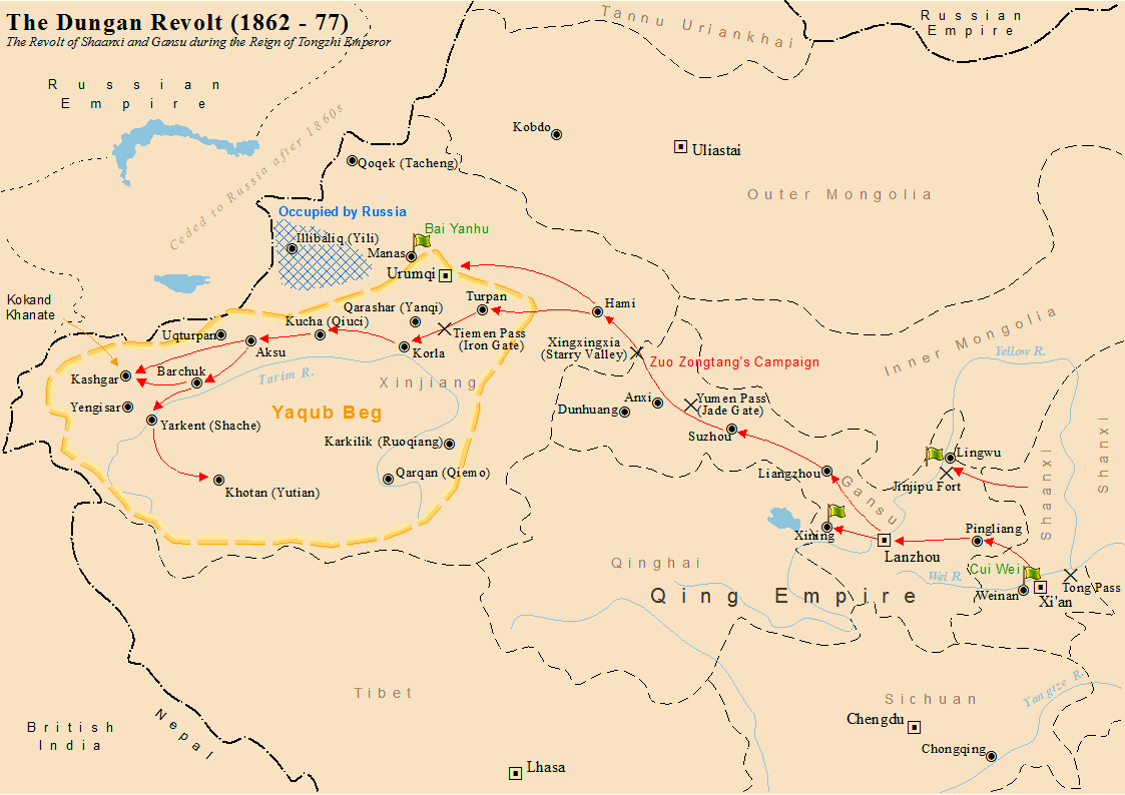
- Map of the Dungan Revolt
- Status: Vassal of the Ottoman Empire (1873–1877)
- Capital: Kashgar
- Religion: Sunni Islam
- Government: Islamic absolute monarchy
- Emir
  - 1864–1865: Ghazi Khatib Khoja
  - 1865–1877: Yakub Beg
- History
  - Established: 12 November 1864
  - Qing reconquest of Xinjiang: 18 December 1877
Preceded by	Succeeded by
Qing Empire	Qing Empire
- Today part of: China

Yettishar

Uyghur name
- Uyghur: يەتتەشەھەر خانلىقى
Transcriptions
- Latin Yëziqi: Yettesheher Khanliqi

Chinese name
- Traditional Chinese: 哲德沙爾汗國
- Simplified Chinese: 哲德沙尔汗国
Transcriptions
Standard Mandarin
- Hanyu Pinyin: Zhédéshā'ěr Hànguó

Chagatay name
- Chagatay: یته شهر خانلیگی

Yettishar (Note: Also spelled Yettesheher or Yettishahr (from Uyghur) or Yättä Shähär (from Chagatai).) (Chagatai: یته شهر; Uyghur: يەتتەشەھەر; lit. 'Seven Cities' or 'Heptapolis'), also known as Kashgaria or the Kashgar Emirate, was a Turkic state in Xinjiang that existed from 1864 to 1877, during the Dungan Revolt against the Qing dynasty. It was an Islamic monarchy ruled by Yakub Beg, a Kokandi who secured power in Kashgar (later made Yettishar's capital) through a series of military and political manoeuvres. Yettishar's eponymous seven cities were Kashgar, Khotan, Yarkand, Yengisar, Aksu, Kucha, and Korla.

In 1873, the Ottoman Empire recognised Yettishar as a vassal state and Yakub Beg as its emir. The Ottoman flag flew over Kashgar from 1873 to 1877.

On 18 December 1877, the Qing army entered Kashgar and brought the state to an end.

== Background ==
By the 1860s, Xinjiang had been under Qing rule for a century. The area had been conquered in 1759 from the Dzungar Khanate whose core population, the Oirats, subsequently became the targets of genocide. However, Xinjiang consisted mostly of semi-arid or desert lands, which were not attractive to potential Han settlers aside from a few traders. Consequently, Turkic peoples such as the Uyghurs settled in the area instead.

The Uyghurs were not known by their present name until the early 20th century. The Uzbeks that dwelled close to present-day Xinjiang were collectively called "Andijanis" or "Kokandis", while the Uyghurs in the Tarim Basin were known as "Turki", likely due to their Turkic language. There were also Uyghur immigrants residing in the Ili area who were called "Taranchi". The modern term "Uyghur" was assigned to the Turki by the then newly created Soviet Union in 1921 at a conference in Tashkent. As a result, sources from the period of the Dungan Revolt make no mentions of Uyghurs. The conflict was mainly an ethnic and religious war fought by Muslims (particularly Hui) in China's Xinjiang, Shaanxi, Ningxia and Gansu provinces, from 1862 to 1877.

Thousands of Muslim refugees from Shaanxi fled to Gansu. Some of them formed significant battalions in eastern Gansu, intending to reconquer their lands in Shaanxi. While the Hui rebels were preparing to attack Gansu and Shaanxi, Yakub Beg, an ethnic Uzbek or Tajik commander from the Kokand Khanate, fled from the Khanate in 1865 after losing Tashkent to the Russians, settled in Kashgar, and soon managed to take complete control of the oasis towns surrounding the Tarim Basin in southern Xinjiang.

== Yakub Beg ==
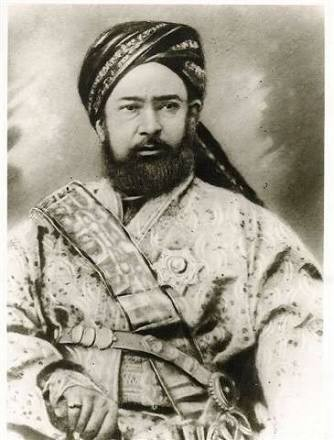
Yakub Beg

Yakub Beg was born in the town of Piskent, in the Khanate of Kokand (present-day Uzbekistan). During the Dungan Revolt, he conquered the Tarim Basin and enthroned himself as the ruler of Yettishar when the Chinese were expelled from the region in 1864. During his short-lived reign, Yakub Beg entered into relations with the British and Russian Empires, and signed respective treaties with each. However, he failed to receive meaningful assistance from the two great powers when he was in need of their support against the Qing.

Yakub Beg was given the title of "Athalik Ghazi" or "Champion Father of the Faithful" by the Emir of Bukhara in 1866. The Ottoman Sultan presented him with the title of Emir.

Yakub Beg's rule was unpopular among the native population of Yettishar. One of his Kashgari subjects, a warrior and the son of a chieftain, described his rule with the following: "During Chinese rule there was everything; now there is nothing." A substantial decrease in trade also ensued during his years in power. Yakub Beg was disliked by his Turkic subjects, who were with heavy taxes and a harsh interpretation of Sharia.

South Korean historian Hodong Kim argues that Yakub Beg's disastrous and inexact commands failed the locals and they in turn welcomed the return of Chinese troops. Qing general Zuo Zongtang wrote that: "The Andijanis are tyrannical to their people; government troops should comfort them with benevolence. The Andijanis are greedy in extorting from the people; government troops should rectify this by being generous."

== Downfall ==
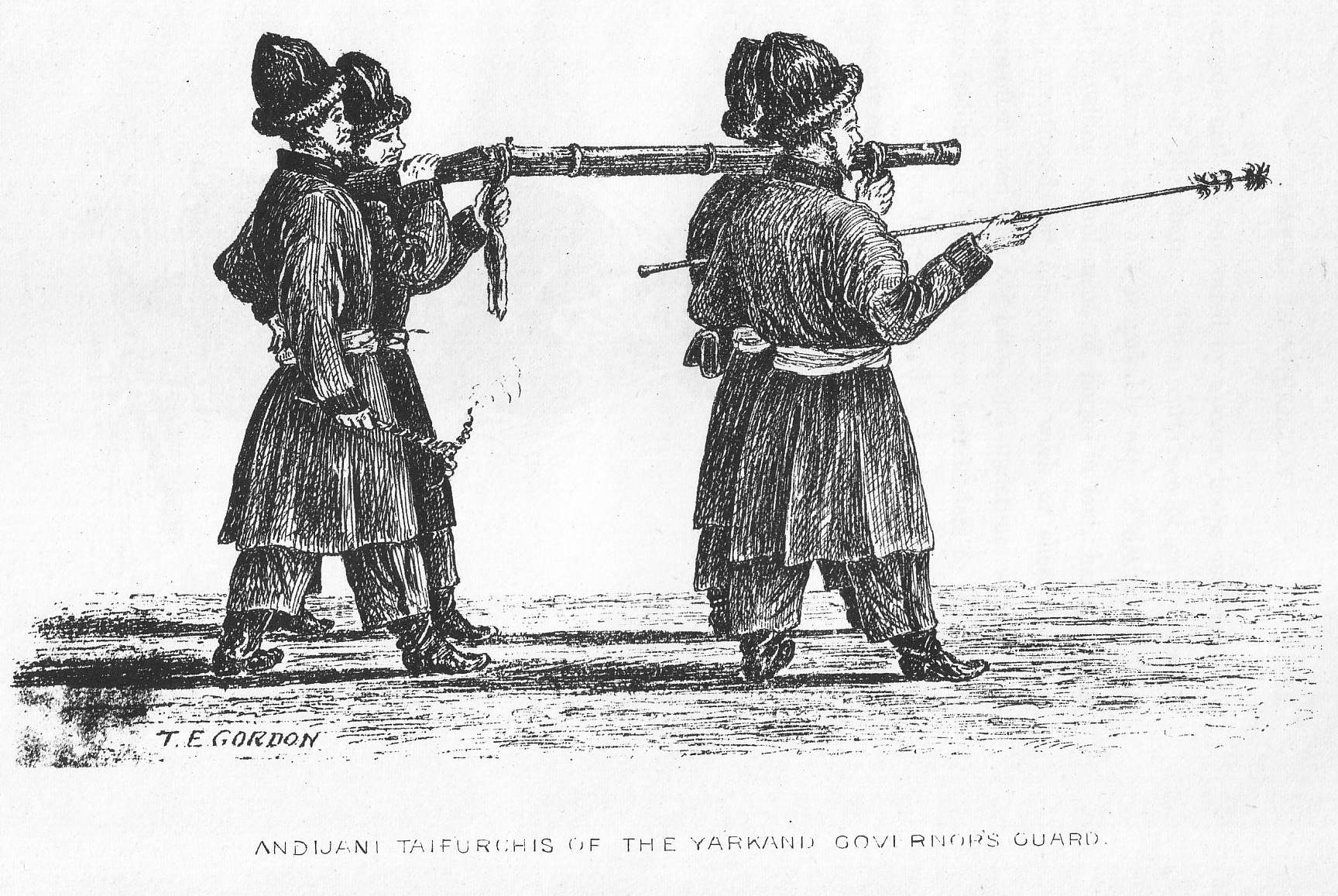
Andijani troops loyal to Yakub Beg

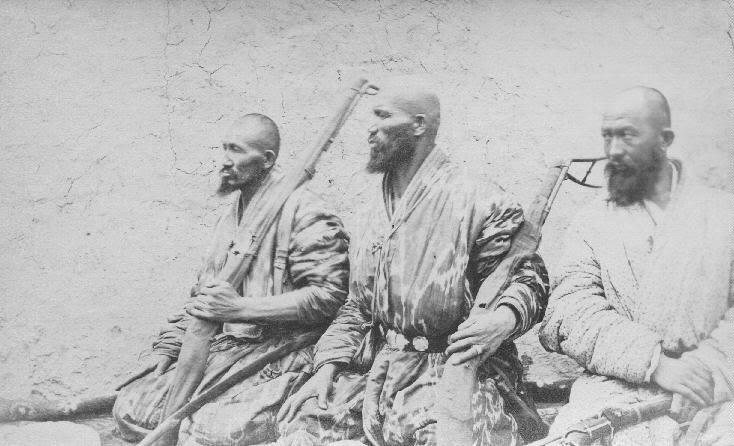
Uyghur troops loyal to Yakub Beg, in Khotan

In the late 1870s, the Qing decided to reconquer Xinjiang with Zuo Zongtang, previously a general in the Xiang Army, as commander-in-chief. His subordinates were the Han General Liu Jintang and Manchu leader Jin Shun. As General Zuo moved into Xinjiang to crush the Muslims under Yakub Beg, he was joined by Dungan Khufiyya Sufi General Ma Anliang and his forces, which were composed entirely of Dungan Muslims. In addition, General Dong Fuxiang had an army of both Han and Dungan people, and his army took the Kashgar and Khotan areas during the reconquest. The Shaanxi Gedimu Dungan Generals Cui Wei and Hua Decai, who had defected back to the Qing, also joined General Zuo's attack on Yakub Beg's forces.

General Zuo implemented a conciliatory policy toward the Muslim rebels, pardoning those who did not rebel and surrendered if they had joined Yakub Beg's forces only for religious reasons. Rebels received rewards for defecting and assisting the Qing against their former compatriots. General Zuo informed General Zhang Yao that the Andijanis (i.e. Yakub Beg's forces) had mistreated the local populace, and he should therefore treat the locals "with benevolence" to win their favour. Zuo wrote that the main targets were only the "die-hard partisans" and their leaders, Yakub Beg and Bai Yanhu. A Russian wrote that soldiers under General Liu "acted very judiciously with regard to the prisoners whom he took ... His treatment of these men was calculated to have a good influence in favour of the Chinese." In contrast to General Zuo, the Manchu commander Dorongga viewed all Muslims as the enemy and sought to indiscriminately massacre them.

General Liu's army had modern German artillery, which Jin's forces lacked; Jin's advance was consequently not as rapid as Liu's. After Liu bombarded Kumuti, rebel casualties numbered 6,000 dead while Bai Yanhu was forced to flee. Thereafter Qing forces entered Ürümqi unopposed. Zuo wrote that Yakub Beg's soldiers had modern Western weapons but were cowardly: "The Andijani chieftain Yakub Beg has fairly good firearms. He has foreign rifles and foreign guns, including cannon using explosive shells [Kai Hua Pao]; but his are not as good nor as effective as those in the possession of our government forces. His men are not good marksmen, and when repulsed they simply ran away."

In December 1877, all of Kashgar was reconquered. Muhammad Ayub and his Dungan detachments took refuge in Russian possessions. Qing rule was restored over all of Xinjiang, except for the Ili region, which was returned by Russia to China under the 1881 Treaty of Saint Petersburg.

== Death of Yakub Beg ==
The manner of Yakub Beg's death is unclear. The Times of London and the Russian Turkestan Gazette both reported that he had died after a short illness. The contemporaneous historian Musa Sayrami (1836–1917) states that he was poisoned on 30 May 1877 in Korla by the former hakim (local city ruler) of Yarkand, Niyaz Hakim Beg, after the latter conspired with Qing forces in Dzungaria. However, Niyaz Beg himself, in a letter to the Qing authorities, denied his involvement in the death of Yakub Beg, and claimed that the Yettishar ruler committed suicide. Some say that he was killed in battle with the Chinese. According to South Korean historian Hodong Kim, most scholars agree that natural death (of a stroke) is the most plausible explanation.
