= Tu-ki Min =

South Korean sinologist (1932–2000)

- Born: November 2, 1932; Haenam County, Zenranan-dō, Korea, Empire of Japan
- Died: May 7, 2000 (aged 67)
- Occupations: historian, educator

Academic background
- Education: Seoul National University

Tu-ki Min (Korean: 민두기; Hanja: 閔斗基; Korean pronunciation : [min.du.gi]; November 2, 1932 – May 7, 2000) was a South Korean scholar, historian, and honorary professor at Seoul National University. He is known as the founder of modern Chinese history in South Korea.

Min was involved in establishing the Society for Asian Historical Studies, a South Korean academic organization focused on East Asian Studies. Min received the Korea Book Award, National Academy of Sciences Award, Kumho Academic Award, and JoongAng Ilbo Academic Award for his research in Chinese history.

In Essays on Modern Chinese History (중국근대사연구, 1973), Min examined modern Chinese history beyond the framework of Korea–China relations that had characterized some earlier South Korean scholarship.The work examined relationships between traditional Chinese political structures, the Xinhai Revolution, and the May Fourth Movement. Min’s book was translated and published by journals in countries such as Germany, China, and Taiwan.

Min gained recognition among scholars in Mainland China. He served as an endowed professor in Nanjing University for studies in the republic history of China. In 1999, he was invited as a keynote speaker to an international conference titled “May Fourth Movement and 21st Century China" held at the University of Beijing, which commemorated the 80th anniversary of the May Fourth Movement of China.

== Life ==
=== Early life and education ===
Tu-ki Min was born in Haenam County, South Jeolla Province, Korea, Empire of Japan, on November 2, 1932, during the period of Japanese rule. He graduated from Simsang Elementary School in 1939 and from Gwangjuseo Middle School (now Gwangju Jeil High School), in 1951. While the classes were taught in Japanese, his mother insisted that he learn the Korean alphabet at home.

Min entered the Department of History at Seoul National University, in 1951, pursuing studies in Korean history, specifically the Donghak Peasant Revolution. However, one of his professors, Byung-Ik Ko, told Min that the Donghak Movement could be interpreted from the perspective of China. Min subsequently developed an interest in Chinese history, including the relationship between Chinese and Korean historical developments. After his graduation from Seoul National University in 1955, he served in the military for a few months and re-entered the school as a graduate student. He earned his master’s degree with his thesis Discourses on Iron and Salt and a doctoral degree with his thesis Study on the Gentry Class of the Qing Dynasty.

=== Death ===
On May 7, 2000, Min died from a chronic illness at the age of 68 while he was serving as an honorary professor at Seoul National University and as an endowed chair professor at Yonsei University. His family revealed that near the end of his life, he insisted that his death should not be known outside of his family. Hence, only a few of his direct students were able to receive the news of his death and attend his funeral.

== Career ==
Tu-ki Min served as a professor at the Department of History at Soongsil University from 1966 to 1969. Then, in 1968, he became a faculty member of Seoul National University, where he continued his career to eventually become the chair of the Department of Asian History in 1977. From 1983 to 1985, he served as the chairman of the Society for Asian Historical Studies (동양사학회), which was founded by several history scholars, including Min himself, in 1965. After retiring from Seoul National University in 1998, Min continued to advise students on their research.

Min also held research appointments outside South Korea. He served as a visiting researcher at Harvard University under the Harvard-Yenching fellowship from 1979 to 1980.During his time at Harvard University, Min's research attracted the interest of an international group of scholars who subsequently translated six of his articles into English. The translations were published by the Harvard-Yenching Institute in 1989 under the title National Polity and Local Power: The Transformation of Late Imperial China. Additionally, he participated as a researcher at University of Hamburg, Germany, and served as an endowed chair professor at Nanjing University, China.

== Achievements ==
Min contributed to the development of Chinese history as a distinct academic field in South Korea. During the period when Korea was under Japanese rule, the field of Chinese History Studies was also influenced by Japan’s Asian Studies. The majority of the resources had to be obtained secondarily from Japanese scholarly works, in which Eastern History was recorded from a stance that emphasized Japanese Imperialism. Even after the liberation, the study of Chinese History was not prominent in Korea as most scholarly works focused on restoring the national identity of Korea and structuring the new postcolonial narrative of Korea’s national history. As a result, much of the historical scholarship in South Korea during this period focused on Korean history. Although there were some studies on Chinese history, they mostly focused on the Korea-China relations rather than the history of China itself. Also, due to the Cold War in the 1950s, China was interpreted as a Communist enemy to Korean society, which made it more challenging for scholars to academically explore Chinese history.

Min pursued research in Chinese history during this period. Studying history at Seoul National University, he started to work on Chinese history with the Salt and Iron Debates of the Han dynasty. His research also addressed Qing dynasty administration and the reforms of the late Qing period. As head of the Department of Asian History, Min supported the development of Chinese historical studies and monographic research on China in South Korea. He also helped establish faculty positions and supervised students specializing in Chinese history.

Following the establishment of the organization, its members began holding monthly presentations aimed at improving the quality of research and published a scholarly journal titled Journal of Asian Historical Studies to encourage students' active participation in research. The society's activities included research on East Asian history beyond the framework of Korea's bilateral historical relations. Korean historians also participated in international academic exchanges during this period.

=== Methodology ===
Min developed an approach to Chinese historical research that has been described as “Min Tu-ki History”. The methodology was derived from the following ideas. First, he stressed that Chinese history should be studied as a professional field of study that is independent from other scholarly fields. Second, he not only emphasized the structural understanding and scientific argument of Chinese history, but also called for the consideration of the distinctive characteristics of history that are different from those of social science. Third, he underlined a value-neutral and objective research attitude in the relationship between politics and academia. Fourth, while he acknowledged the importance of the general population in the relationship between the elite and the people, he viewed Chinese history from the perspective of the elite. Min and his students applied this approach in the series Lectures on Chinese History (강좌중국사, 1989).

== Works ==
Min’s study focused on the Reform Movement and the National Revolution Movements in China. His methodology was to understand the Classical Period of China through the research of early Chinese ancient history and to discover how modern China has transformed through the reinterpretation of traditions based on his study of the Traditional Period. Min argued that internal political and social developments played a significant role in China's modernization, rather than interpreting modernization primarily as a response to Western influence.

=== Essays on Modern Chinese History ===
Published in 1973, Essays on Modern Chinese History focused on Chinese history independently of Korea–China relations. The book differed from earlier approaches that primarily examined Chinese history through Korea–China relations. It led Min to gain academic acknowledgement not only in Korea but also in global contexts. It was translated and introduced in multiple international journals including Germany’s Oriens Extremus (1976), China’s Qing History Research Correspondence (1980), and Taiwan’s Collection of Essays on Modern Chinese History (중국현대사논집 1980). Although Min titled his work as Essays on Modern Chinese History, he did not merely focus on the description of modern events such as the Constitutional Movement, the Xinhai Revolution, or the May Fourth Movement. Rather, in order to discover the essence and causes of these movements, he depicted China’s underlying historical factors in relation to the Traditional Period of China. By understanding the formation of the ideology of the Chinese gentry class, which ruled the Chinese society before the May Fourth Movement, Min described China’s internal agenda set by this gentry class that led to the intrinsic motivation of the modern transformations in Chinese history.

=== National Polity and Local Power: The Transformation of Late Imperial China (1989) ===
From 1979 to 1980, when Min participated in the Harvard-Yenching fellowship program, he became known to American scholars for his articles that dealt with debates regarding classical Chinese governmental values. Through his articles, Min argued that the debate on the Chinese fengian (feudal) and junxian (centralized bureaucratic) systems of government led to the debates on China’s reform in the late nineteenth and early twentieth century. His study revealed a vital link between China’s bureaucratic past and its nationalist present, and raised the concept of intrinsic development of China, which suggested that China’s internal agendas stimulated its modernization. Min’s lecture on his articles inspired a multinational team of professors and researchers to translate and publish six of his major articles in English. The participants in this project include Timothy Brook, Olive Homes, Philip A. Kuhn, Peter C. Perdue, Heije Choe, Hodong Kim, and Hongmyon Kim. In 1989, the Harvard University Press published the translated collection of Min’s articles, titled as National Polity and Local Power: The Transformation of Late Imperial China (1989).

This work served as a useful reference to American scholars since Min, as neither a Chinese nor a Western scholar, maintained the balance between the East and the West and revealed how China’s own internal agenda conditioned Chinese political life throughout its transition to modernity. Therefore, while the majority of American historians focused on the study of Chinese history in relation to Western history or in terms of China’s response to the West, Min shifted the focus of their study to China’s intrinsic motivation for revolution and modernization.

Min was one of the first Korean scholars to have his previously published articles fully translated into English and published as a book in the US. Several scholars welcomed the publication of Min’s articles and wrote book reviews in academic journals. Amongst them, Jonathan K. Ocko of Duke University underlined the significance of this work by saying, “although five essays in this volume of translations first appeared in 1978, they have not been superseded by subsequent scholarship and remain instructive, stimulating reading.”

== Notable works ==
Academic works

Essays on Modern Chinese History (중국근대사연구, 1973)

Contemporary China and Modern Chinese History (현대중국과 중국 근대사, 1981)

The Periodization of Chinese History (중국사 시대구분론, 1984)

A Study of Modern Chinese Reform Movements (중국근대개혁운동의 연구, 1985)

Lectures on Chinese History (강좌중국사, 1989)

National Polity and Local Power: The Transformation of Late Imperial China, 1989

The Historical Awareness of China (중국의 역사인식, 1993)

The History of Xinhai Revolution (신해혁명사, 1994)

A Study of China’s Modern Revolution Movement (중국 초기혁명운동의 연구, 1997)

Experiment of Liberalism in China (중국에서의 자유주의 실험, 1997)

Autobiographical Essay

When I Meet a Bunch of Wild Flowers (한 송이 들꽃과 만날 때, 1985)

== Criticism ==
Hee-gyeo Kim, a professor of History at Kwangwoon University, criticized the historical objectivism, archaeologicalism, and political objectivity asserted by Min and his students, as nothing more than myths.

Kim pointed out the fact that while Min advocated for a strict depiction of historical evidence claiming that historical records tell everything, he did not contain any independent papers on the Chinese communist party in his and his students' masterpiece, Lectures on Chinese History. Kim argued that Min and his students had settled an incomplete Chinese modern history by turning a blind eye to Communism, selectively collecting historical records and excluding certain research subjects.

Furthermore, Kim argued that the true factors that Min used for his studies were liberalism and elitism, not archaeologicalism and objectivism as Min claimed. Kim condemned Min for using liberalism to replace the socialist revolution and the communist party with unnecessary elements of Chinese modern history, and for using elitism to define the general public as merely mobilized beings without identifying them as subjects of history. Kim evaluated that Min and his students failed to provide an objective analysis of Chinese history by neglecting the communist history and claimed that their published work is rather an elitist attempt to flaunt their superiority in the field of Sinology.
