= Nikolai Petrovsky =

Russian politician (1837–1908)

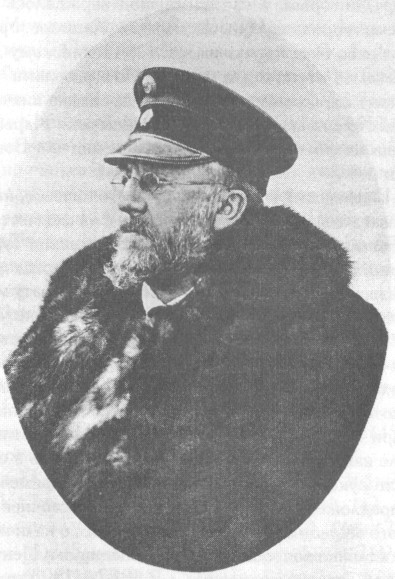
Nikolai Petrovsky

Nikolay Fyodorovich Petrovsky (Russian: Николай Фёдорович Петровский; 1837–1908) was the Russian consul-general in Kashgar from 1882 until 1902.

Petrovsky's main adversary during his time in Central Asia was George Macartney, his British counterpart. The competition between their two countries for influence in Central Asia is known as the Great Game. Between 1899 and June 1902 the two did not speak to each other, although both were on friendly terms with visiting travellers such as Sven Hedin.

Petrovsky was very interested in collecting materials on the history of Xinjiang. The Soviet scholar A.F. Usmanov suggested that he may have been instrumental in encouraging the veteran of Yaqub Beg's regime, Mulla Musa Sayrami, to write his Tārīkh-i amniyya ("History of Peace"), which to this day remains one of the best sources on the events in the region in the 19th century.

By the end of the 19th century, Petrovsky's personal collection included some texts in the then-unknown Tocharian languages, among other obscure dialects. The bulk of his collection was donated by Petrovsky to the Asiatic Museum in St. Petersburg.

== See also ==
- Mikhail Nikolayevich Muravyov
- Pyotr Kuzmich Kozlov
