= Musa Sayrami =

Uyghur Chinese historican (1836–1917)

- Born: 1836
- Died: 1917 (aged 80–81)
- Occupation: Historian
- Notable work: Tārīkh-i amniyya ("History of Peace")

Mulla Musa Sayrami (Chagatay: ملا موسی سیرامی, romanized: Mullā Mūsā Säyrāmī; Uyghur: موللا مۇسا سايرامى, romanized: Molla Musa Sayrami; 1836–1917) was a historian from Xinjiang, known for his account of the events in that region in the 19th century, in particular the Dungan Rebellion of 1864–1877. While the ethnonym Uyghurs, with its modern meaning, was not yet used in Musa Sayrami's day, he probably would be called a Uyghur if he lived a few decades later, based on his place of birth and the language of his literary works.

== Biography ==
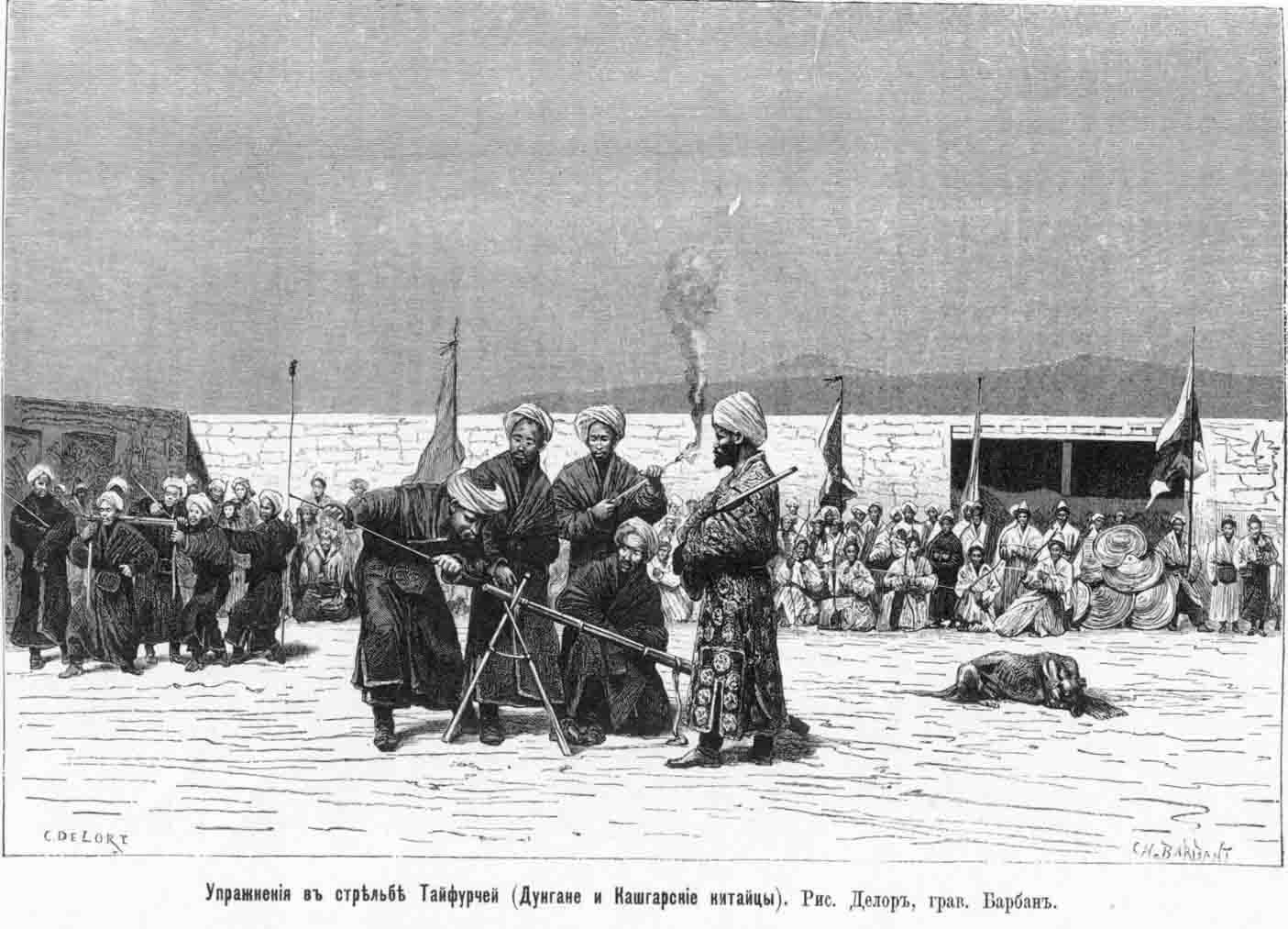
Yaqub Beg's gunners' exercises

Musa was originally from the village of Sayram, located northwest of Kuqa in what is today Baicheng County, Xinjiang. The place should not be confused with the larger city of the same name in Kazakhstan. In his youth he was sent to Kuqa to study at the madrassah of Mulla Osman Akhund. He became a close friend of one of his classmates, named Mahmudin (Muḥammad al-Dīn), a son of Burhān al-Dīn Khoja, an important member of the Khoja clan. Musa later referred to Mahmudin as "Khojam Padishah".

In the summer 1864, during the early days of the Dungan Rebellion in Xinjiang, Musa joined the army of the rebel Khoja Burhān al-Dīn when it passed through Sayram. Along with Burhan's son Mahmudin, Musa was among Burhan's rebels at Aksu and Uqturpan, and became Burhan's right-hand man there.

After the people of Uqturpan overthrew the Khojas in 1867, Musa Sayrami escorted the arrested Khojas to the headquarters of the new ruler of the region, Yaqub Beg. He then found a place for himself in Yaqub Beg's government apparatus, where he served under Mirza Baba Beg, the zakatchi (chief revenue officer) in Aksu.

Musa survived the death of Yaqub Beg and the reconquest of Xinjiang by Zuo Zongtang's Qing armies in 1877. He lived the rest of his days in Aksu, writing and re-writing his Tarikh-i amniyya, which he completed in 1903.

== Tārīkh-i amniyya and Tārīkh-i ḥamīdi ==
Tārīkh-i amniyya ("History of Peace") was written in the Chagatai language—the old literary language of Central Asia, which can be thought of as an ancestral form of today's Uyghur and Uzbek languages. According to modern scholars, the Chagatai of Musa Sayrami's manuscripts had been influenced by "modern" Uyghur language (i.e., the vernacular of Sayrami's own era).

Soviet researchers suggested that the title of Musa's work also alludes to the name of one of his friends, Dadhah Muhammad Amin Bai Aqsaqal; thus, it can also be read as "History dedicated to Amin". Amin was the elder (aqsaqal) of the Russian subjects in Aksu and Uqturpan, and maintained correspondence with the Russian consul in Kashgar, Nikolai Petrovsky. The Soviet researcher K.A. Usmanov thus suggested that Petrovsky, known as an avid collector of materials related to the history of the region, may have been instrumental in encouraging Musa to undertake his work.

Tārīkh-i amniyya, which has survived in several manuscripts, consists of the following parts:

- the introduction, which surveys the history of Xinjiang from Noah to Chengiz Khan to the beginning of the Dungan Rebellion
- Part 1, which discusses the early stages of the rebellion, under leadership of the Khojas
- Part 2, which discusses the Yaqub Beg's regime, and the reconquest of the region by the Chinese troops in 1877.
- Conclusion

Tārīkh-i amniyya was first published by the Russian scholar N.N. Pantusov in Kazan in 1905. (Pantusov had apparently a special interest in the history of the region; he had earlier published a Russian translation of another work on the same topic, Mullā Bilāl's Ghazāt dar mulk-i Chín ("Holy War in China"), originally written in 1876.)

A modern Uyghur translation was published in Urumqi in 1988 as Tärikhi äminiyä.

Tārīkh-i ḥamīdi (History of Ḥamid) is a revised version of Tārīkh-i amniyya, completed in 1908. A modern Uyghur translation by Enver Baytur was published in Beijing in 1986. An English translation by Eric Schluessel has been published by Columbia University Press.

== Modern assessment ==
In the view of the modern expert on the period's history, Kim Hodong, Sayrami is "one of the best historians that Central Asia has ever produced", and his books are the most important locally produced source on the Dungan Rebellion and the Yaqub Beg regime.
