= Piskent District =

Coordinates: 40.8972°N 69.3503°E

Piskent
- District
- Piskent tumani
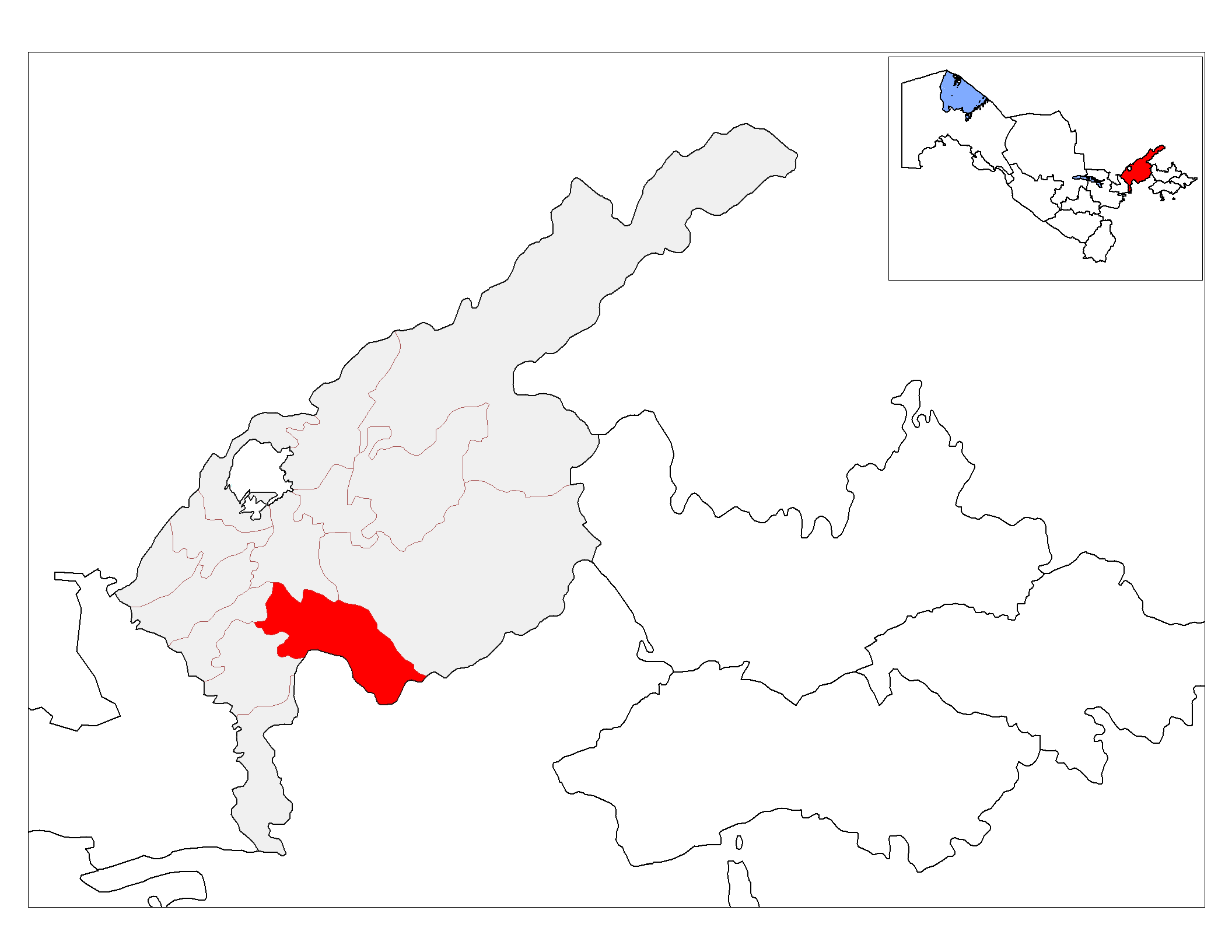
- Country: Uzbekistan
- Region: Tashkent Region
- Capital: Piskent
- Established: 1926

Area
  - Total: 790 km^{2} (310 sq mi)

Population (2021)
  - Total: 102,000
  - Density: 130/km^{2} (330/sq mi)
- Time zone: UTC+5 (UZT)

Piskent (Uzbek: Piskent tumani, Пискент тумани or Pskent tumani / Пскент тумани) is a district of Tashkent Region in Uzbekistan. The capital lies at the city Piskent. It has an area of 790 km^{2} (310 sq mi) and it had 102,000 inhabitants in 2021. The district consists of one city (Piskent), 2 urban-type settlements (Muratali, Said) and 6 rural communities (Oq tepa, Dungqoʻrgʻon, Kelovchi, Murotali, Koriz, Said).
