= Piskent =

- Town
- Location in Uzbekistan
- Coordinates: 40°53′57″N 69°20′33″E
- Country: Uzbekistan
- Region: Tashkent Region
- District: Piskent District
- Town status: 1966

Population (2016)
  - Total: 34,900
- Time zone: UTC+5 (UZT)

Piskent (Uzbek: Piskent) is a city in Tashkent Region, Uzbekistan. It is the capital of Piskent District. The town population was 24,405 people in 1989, and 34,900 in 2016.

== Notable people ==
- Yakub Beg (1820–1877), emir of Yettishar
