= Yangliuqing New Year pictures =

Chinese folk art from Tianjin

Yangliuqing New Year picture
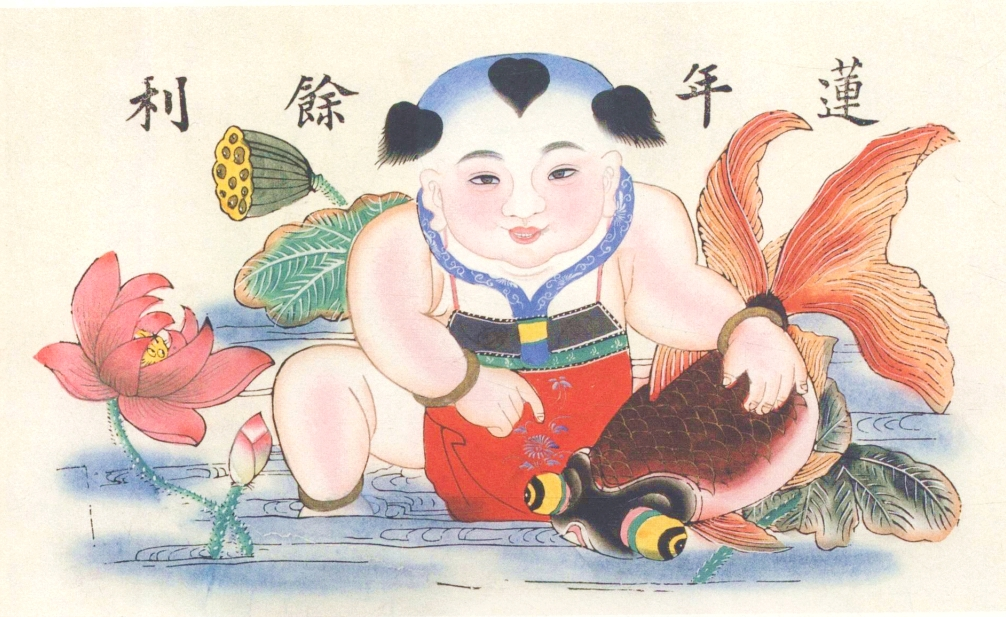
- Artist: Various folk artists
- Year: Late Ming dynasty (origin), peak in Qing dynasty
- Medium: Woodblock printing with hand coloring
- Movement: Chinese folk art
- Subject: New Year themes, folklore, opera scenes, daily life
- Location: Yangliuqing, Xiqing District, Tianjin, China

Yangliuqing New Year pictures (Chinese: 杨柳青年画), also known as Yangliuqing woodblock colored New Year pictures, are a form of Chinese folk art originating from Yangliuqing Town, in the Xiqing District, in Tianjin.

The origins of pictures can be traced back to the late Northern Song period, and a legend that artisans and court painters were taken north during the Jin invasion, giving rise to the saying "Northern Song painting tradition passed to Yangliuqing". The exact formation of the woodblock printing and hand-coloring technique is uncertain; scholars generally date it to the Ming dynasty (Wanli period at the earliest), and no later than the Chongzhen period. The art reached its peak during the Yongzheng, Qianlong, and Guangxu reigns of the Qing dynasty. Supported by Tianjin's developed canal transport system, these prints were distributed along major waterways across China and later spread to Xinjiang through merchant expeditions during the Qing-era "Ganging to the Great Northern Campaign" (赶大营) movement associated with Zuo Zongtang's reconquest of Xinjiang.

Artistically, Yangliuqing New Year pictures inherit traditions from Song and Yuan painting, especially the fine brushwork and heavy-color figure painting style of imperial court painting since the Northern Song dynasty. They also incorporate techniques from Ming dynasty woodblock printing, forming a hybrid production system combining woodblock printing with hand painting. In Chinese printmaking history, Yangliuqing New Year pictures are often paired with Suzhou Taohuawu New Year paintings, jointly referred to as the "South Taohuawu, North Yangliuqing" tradition.

In 2006, Yangliuqing woodblock New Year paintings were inscribed on China's National Intangible Cultural Heritage list.

== Origins ==
The artistic origins of Yangliuqing New Year pictures can be traced back to the late Northern Song period. According to legend, during the Jin invasion, court painters and artisans from the Song capital were taken north, giving rise to the saying “Northern Song painting tradition passed to Yangliuqing”. The exact emergence of Yangliuqing New Year pictures as an independent folk art form is difficult to determine due to the scarcity of written records and surviving early works. On the one hand, traditional literati rarely documented such folk artistic practices; on the other hand, New Year paintings were seasonal consumables, typically replaced annually, resulting in very few surviving early examples. Most extant studies rely on a limited number of surviving prints and oral accounts of artisans, and scholars generally date its formation to the Wanli period of the Ming dynasty, at the latest by the late Ming period.

According to tradition, during the late Yuan dynasty, a craftsman skilled in wood carving fled to the region amid warfare. Observing the abundance of pear and jujube trees suitable for woodblock carving, he began producing prints of door gods, Kitchen Gods, Zhong Kui, Eight Trigrams talismans, Moon Palace images, and other subjects for sale during festivals.

In the thirteenth year of the Yongle reign (1415), the Grand Canal (大运河) was fully completed. Improved transportation facilitated the influx of higher-quality paper and pigments from southern China. As a result, Yangliuqing New Year pictures developed further, with subjects such as winter cold calendars, promotion charts, revolving snake charts, images of the Hehe Erxian (Two Immortals of Harmony), Shouxing (God of Longevity), and “Three Blessings” compositions. However, early prints remained mostly monochrome, often using yellow paper printed with black or red outlines, with a maximum size of a single folio sheet.

== Development in the Ming dynasty ==
With continued development, printing techniques improved significantly. In the mid-to-late Ming dynasty, artisan Dai Lianzeng introduced color woodblock printing and enhanced hand-coloring techniques, including powdering faces, outlining facial features, and adding gold or lead-white decorations to clothing and floral patterns. These innovations produced more vivid, elegant, and refined compositions, expanding the market reach of the paintings.

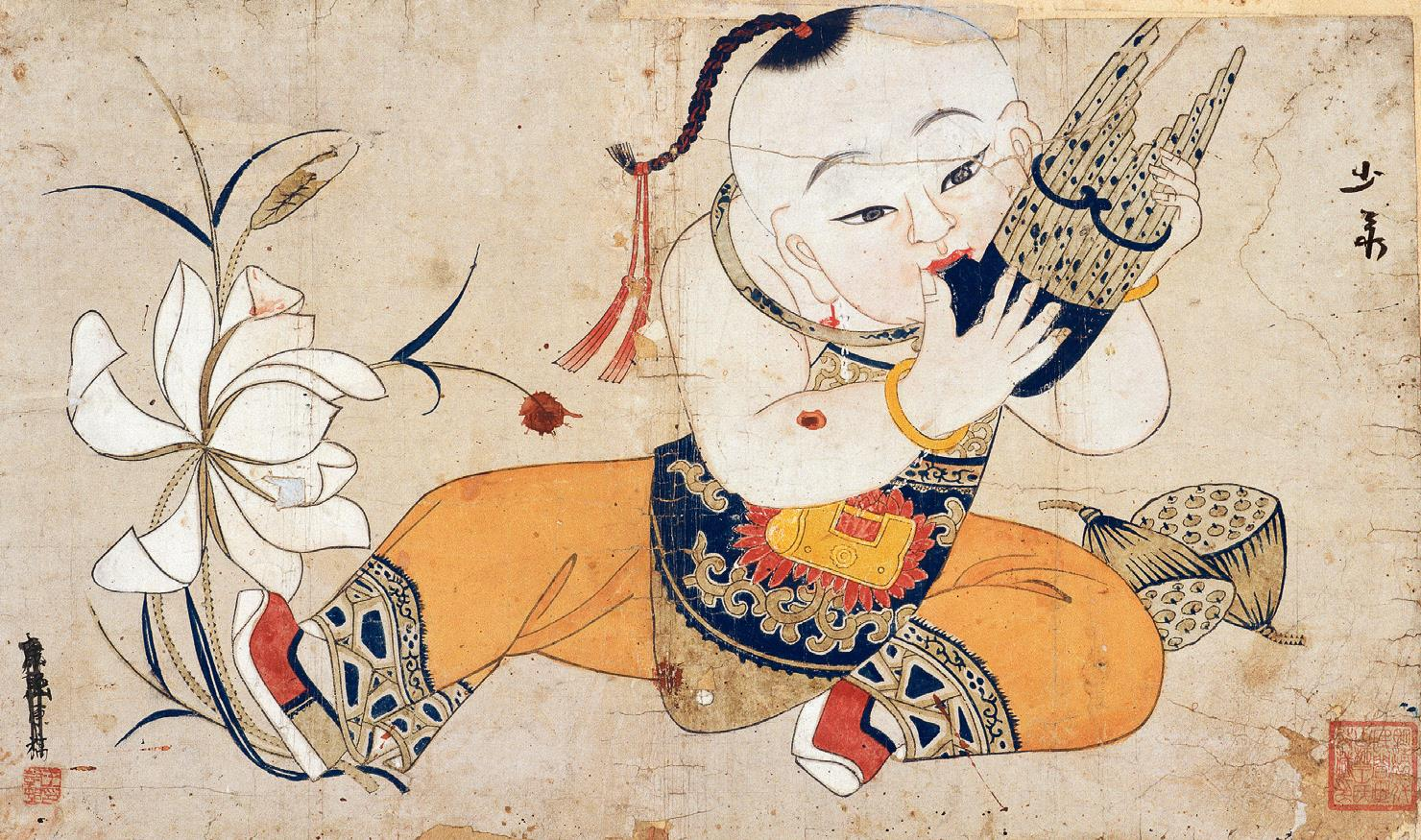
Liansheng Guizi Qing dynasty

As production expanded, Dai Lianzeng established workshops that became prominent workshops in Yangliuqing. These workshops implemented specialized divisions of labor across carving, printing, coloring, and finishing processes. During peak demand, coloring and detailing work was often outsourced to workers’ families in surrounding villages, paid per piece. This practice gradually spread across more than thirty nearby villages, forming a regional painting industry culture described as “every household capable of coloring, every village skilled in painting”.. Later, other workshops such as Qijianlong and Lishengxing also emerged, contributing to the expansion of the industry and its commercial distribution.

== Qing dynasty prosperity ==
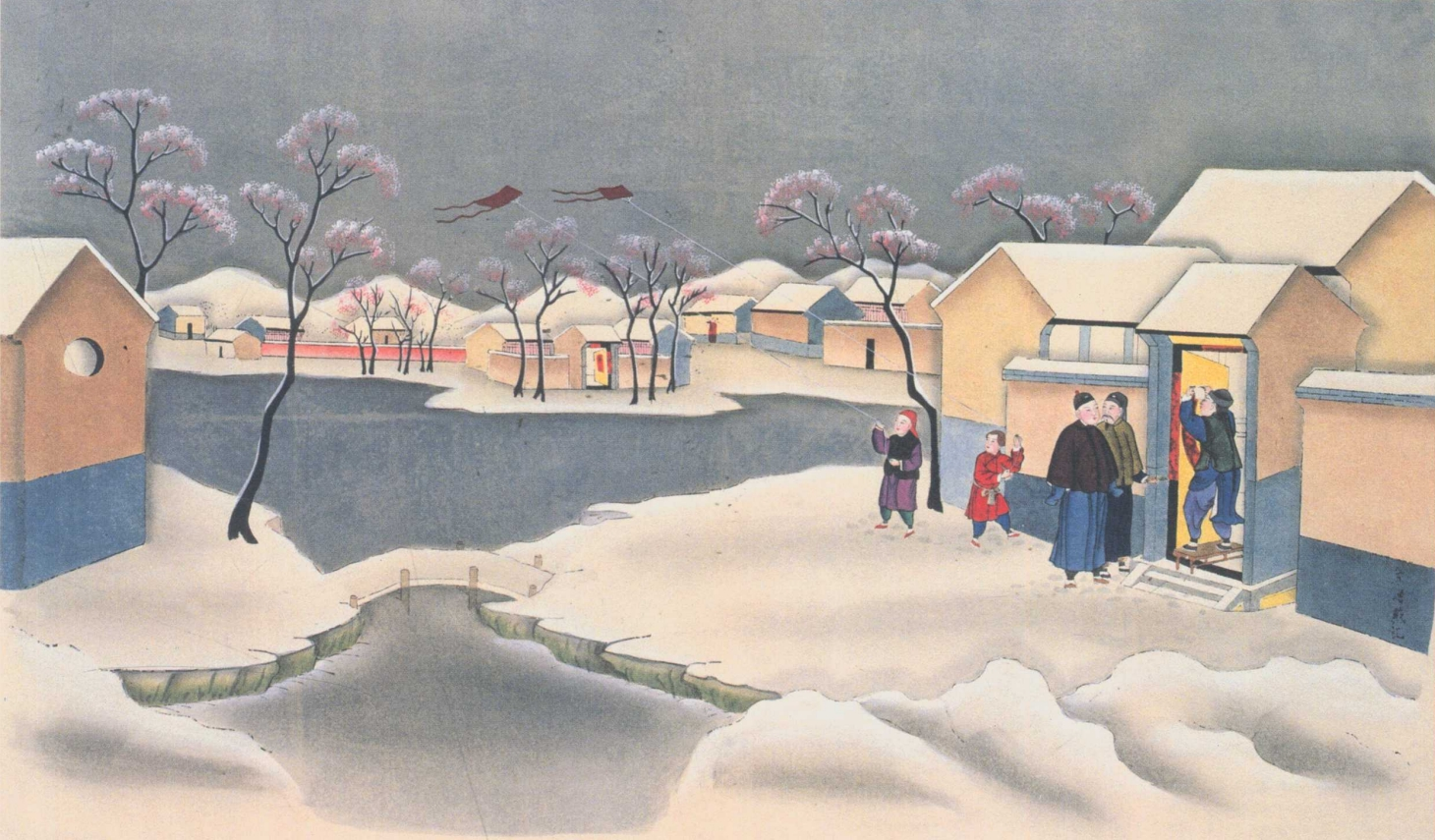
A Bountiful Snow Year, Qing dynasty

During the Kangxi period of the Qing dynasty, Yangliuqing New Year pictures were distributed via water transport networks including the Grand Canal, Daqing River, Yongding River, South Canal, North Canal, and Jiyun River systems, reaching major markets such as Beijing. Dai Lianzeng established a shop outside Chongwenmen in Beijing and a workshop in Wenshan Hutong, transporting woodblocks for on-site printing and wholesale distribution.

Around the 1750s (Qianlong period), Dai Lianzeng also established workshops in Dongfengtai (modern Fengtai Town, Ninghe District, Tianjin), recruiting local workers and training artisans. Distribution networks were also established in Shenyang, extending market reach to Northeast China.

Workshops such as Dai, Qi Jianlong, and Chongxing expanded operations in Beijing. Among them, Chongxing’s production capacity was relatively limited and relied primarily on fan paintings and silk decorations for income. According to local accounts, during the late Qianlong period, imperial patronage contributed to the reputation of these workshops. However, during the Xianfeng period of wartime unrest, some workshops were looted and later relocated back to Tianjin.

Subsequently, workshop lineages diversified. By the late Jiaqing period, painter Qian Zhesheng from the south introduced painting drafts (pounces). During the Daoguang period, distribution expanded from North China to Northwest China and Xinjiang . Despite disruptions during the Tongzhi period, the industry still comprised more than thirty workshops with diverse themes.

During the late Qing Guangxu period, following the Xinjiang campaigns led by Zuo Zongtang, the “Going to the Great Northern Campaign” (赶大营) movement led to the migration of more than 3,000 people from Yangliuqing. Through trade and settlement, Yangliuqing New Year pictures spread widely in Xinjiang markets.. A 1936 issue of Yi Shi Bao also recorded Yangliuqing New Year pictures as popular goods in this trade network.

== Post Qing dynasty ==
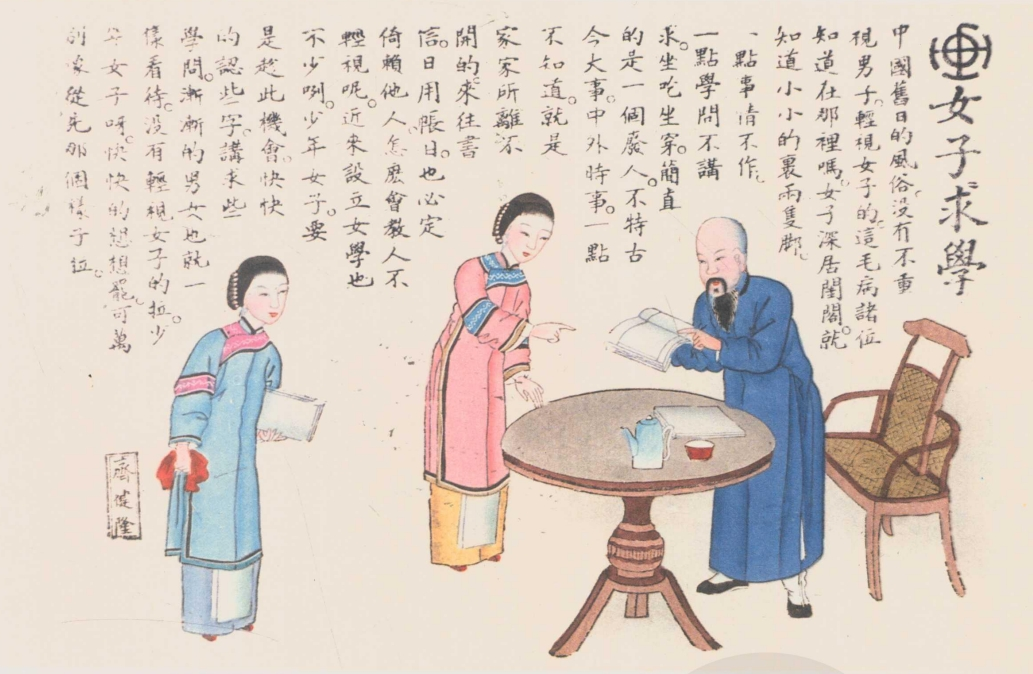
Female Education, late Qing dynasty

By the late Qing and early Republican period, economic decline, the rise of lithographic printing, and repeated conflicts led to the gradual decline of the woodblock New Year painting industry. By the 1920s, only a few workshops remained, primarily relying on northeastern markets. After the outbreak of the Second Sino-Japanese War , production largely ceased.

In 1943, artisans established the "Yuchenghao" workshop., which ceased operation in 1948 due to financial constraints. By 1953, only one workshop reportedly remained in operation. Subsequently, production was reorganized into cooperative forms, eventually forming the Tianjin Yangliuqing New Year Picture Society in the late 1950s.

An article in January, 1957 of the People's Daily reportedly claimed that there were two thousand different block designs of Qing-dynasty woodblocks preserved among the folk of the Yangliuqing around that time. During the Cultural Revolution period, many woodblocks were destroyed. After 1976, training programs were established at Tianjin Academy of Fine Arts, and production gradually resumed during the Reform and Opening-up period. In 1979, the Yangliuqing New Year Picture Society became independent and resumed production of traditional works. In 1992, selected works were distributed to Chinese embassies abroad.

Around 2000, urban redevelopment in Yangliuqing led to the demolition of many traditional residences, and numerous woodblocks preserved in private collections were lost or discarded, affecting the cultural ecology of the craft. In 2006, Yangliuqing woodblock New Year paintings were inscribed on the National Intangible Cultural Heritage list of China.
