= Yakub Beg of Yettishar =

Emir of Yettishar (1820–1877)

Yakub Beg
- Champion Father of the Faithful (اتالیق غازی)
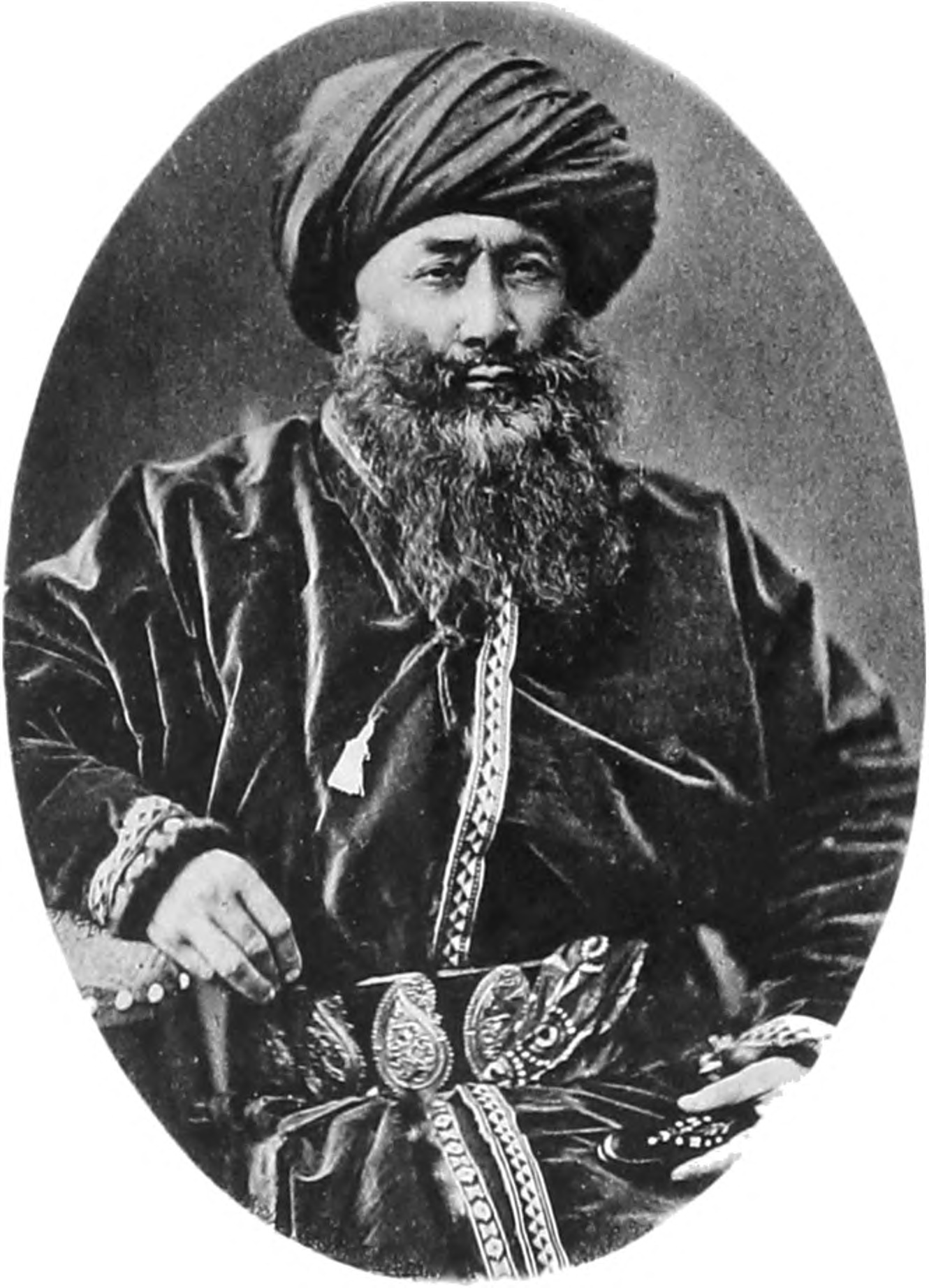

Emir of Yettishar
- Reign: 1865–1877
- Predecessor: Ghazi Khatib Khoja
- Successor: Emirate abolished
- Born: 1820; Piskent, Kokand (present-day Uzbekistan)
- Died: May 1877 (aged 56–57); Korla, Yettishar (present-day China)
- Religion: Sunni Islam

Chinese name
- Chinese: 穆罕默德·雅霍甫伯克
Transcriptions
Standard Mandarin
- Hanyu Pinyin: Mùhǎnmòdé Yǎhuòfǔbókè
- Wade–Giles: Mu^{4}-han^{3}-mo^{4}-te^{2} Ya^{3}-huo^{4}-fu^{3}-po^{2}-k'ei^{4}

Alternative Chinese name
- Chinese: 阿古柏(·帕夏)
Transcriptions
Standard Mandarin
- Hanyu Pinyin: Āgǔbó (Pàxià)
- Wade–Giles: A^{1}-ku^{3}-po^{2} (P'a^{4}-hsia^{4})

Uyghur name
- Uyghur: مۇھەممەت ياقۇپ بېك

Persian name
- Persian: محمد یعقوب بیگ

Uzbek name
- Uzbek: Ёқуб Бек / Yoqub Bek

Muhammad Yakub Beg (Note: Persian: محمد یعقوب بیگ, romanized: Muḥammad Ya'qūb Bēg; Uyghur: مۇھەممەت ياقۇپ بېك, romanized: Muhämmät Yaqup Bek) (c. 1820 – 30 May 1877), later known as Yakub Padishah, (Note: Persian: یعقوب پادشاه, romanized: Ya'qūb Pādishāh; Uyghur: ياقۇپ پادىشاھ, romanized: Yaqup Padishah) was the Kokandi ruler of Yettishar (Kashgaria), a state he established in Xinjiang from 1865 to 1877. He was recognized as Emir of Yettishar by the Ottoman Empire and held the title of "Champion Father of the Faithful".

== Spelling variants ==
In English-language literature, the name Yakub Beg has also been spelt as Yaqub Beg, Yakoob Beg or Yaʿqūb Beg. Authors using Russian sources have also used the spelling Yakub-bek. A few publications in English written by Chinese authors transcribe his name as Āgǔbó, which is the pinyin transcription his name in Chinese, 阿古柏, a shortened form of Chinese: 阿古柏帕夏; pinyin: Āgǔbó Pàxià.

The first name, Muhammad, is subject to the usual variations in spelling. Yaʿqūb is an Arabic analogue of Jacob, and Beg is a Turkic noble title. His noble title Beg was later elevated to Padishah after his rise to power. He was also given the title Atalıq Ghazi (Chagatay: اتالیق غازی, romanized: Ataliq Ghazi, lit. 'Champion Father of the Faithful') by the Emir of Bukhara in 1866, and the Ottoman Sultan granted him the title of Emir.

== Background ==
Beg's ethnic background is uncertain. According to his biographer D. C. Boulger, Beg was a Tajik and a descendant of Timur. Timur himself was not a Tajik, but rather a Turco-Mongol of the Barlas tribe. Korean historian Hodong Kim suggests the claim of descent from Timur was an unsupported fabrication intended to glorify Beg's genealogy by ascribing his descent to both Timur and Genghis Khan.

According to the Great Soviet Encyclopedia, Yakub Beg was ethnically a Tajik. British surveyor Thomas George Montgomerie stated that, although he was a Tajik whose native tongue was Tajiki Neo-Persian, he rarely spoke anything but the local Turkic dialect once his rule over Kashgaria began.

Beg's forefathers had lived in the mountainous part of Karategin before moving to Dahbed, near Samarkand. Beg's father, Pur Muhhammad, (Note: he was also known as Muhhammad Lațit) was born in Samarkand and completed his education in Khojent, later working as a qadi (a judge) at Piskent. He married a local qadi as his second wife. She gave birth to his son Yakub Beg in 1820.

== Life ==
=== Early life ===
Yakub Beg was born in the town of Pskent, in the Khanate of Kokand (now in Uzbekistan). At a young age, he was orphaned, and was thereafter raised by his uncle.

=== Career ===
Yakub's lax lifestyle worried his uncle who sent him to Tashkent to become a weaver. However, Yakub quickly became bored and returned to Piskent where he obtained a minor job under the general Ghadai Bai.

He later worked under the governor of Khojent, Muhhammad Karim Khaska. When Aziz Bacha was appointed as the governor of Tashkent, Muhhammad Karim Khaska was transferred to the Khanate of Kokand along with Beg, but Kashka was soon assassinated by Musulman Quli. This juncture caused Beg to seek service in cavalry under Bacha. Kilauchi's governor Nar Muhhammad married Beg's sister around this time. In 1847, Nar Muhhammad succeeded Kashka as governor of Tashkent, and Beg was appointed as Beg of Chinaz. Around 1849, he was transferred and appointed as commander of Ak-Mechet, primarily owing to his brother-in-law's influence. Beg soon amassed a large fortune. He was involved in the complex factional shifts of the Khanate of Kokand. The internal rivalry between Musalman Quli who was the Mingbashi at the time and Nar Muhhammad led to a clash in 1852 where Quli fled, and one of Nar's allies Utambai became Mingbashi. Beg was subsequently recalled to Tashkent where he was promoted to the rank of military officer with the title of Baturbashi.

=== Qipchaq massacre ===
In late 1852, Muhammad Khudayar Khan, taking advantage of the disunity between the nomadic Qipchaqs and wishing to end their interference in the politics of the Khanate, attempted a coup. The rival Qipchaqs, Nar Muhhammad and Quli, were both captured and executed. According to Vladimir Nalivkin, Beg conspired against the Nar and allied himself with Khudayar, however the veracity of this claim is doubtful. Many Qipchaqs were massacred, and this led to an end of the domination of the Qipchaqs over Khokand. There is some uncertainty as to the whereabouts of Beg between 1852 and 1864. In 1864, however, he helped defend Tashkent during the first Russian attack.

== Rule over Yettishar ==
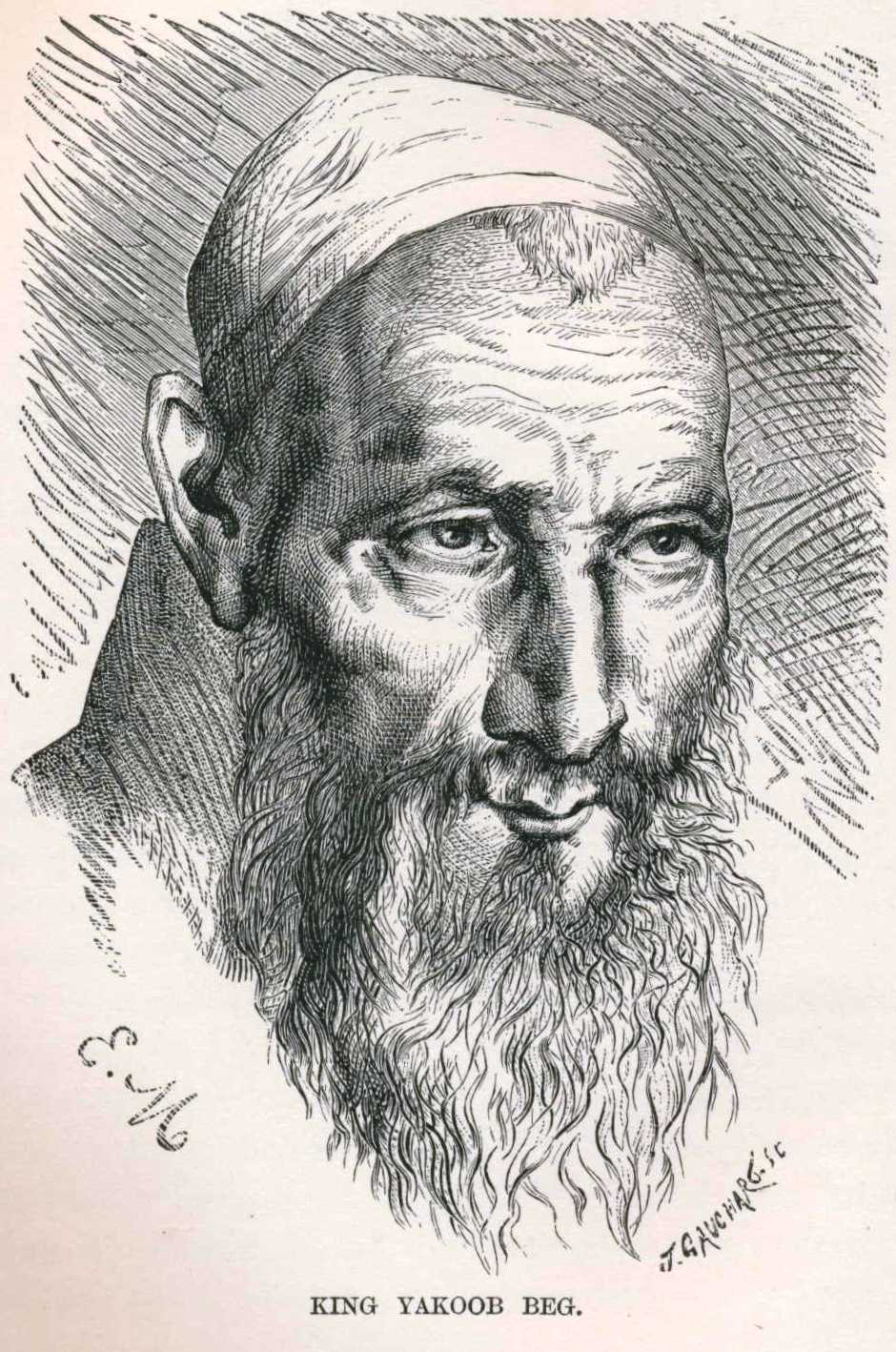
Yakub Beg

=== Establishment of Yettishar (1865) ===
As a result of the Dungan Revolt (1862–77), by 1864, the Chinese held only the citadels of Kashgar and a few other places. The Kyrgyz, Sidik Beg, entered Kashgar but were unable to take the citadel and were sent to Tashkent as a Khoja to become ruler. Burzug Khan, the only surviving son of Jahangir Khoja, left Tashkent with six men. He joined Yakub Beg, left Kokand with 68 men, and crossed the border of China in January 1865. Sadic Beg, defeated by Yakub Beg, was driven beyond the mountains. Yakub went southeast to Yarkand, the largest town in the region, and was driven out by an army from Kucha. He next besieged the Chinese at Yangi Hissar for 40 days and massacred the garrison. Sadic Beg reappeared, was defeated, and talked into becoming an ally. Invaders from Badakshan were also talked into an alliance. A Dungan force from Kucha and eastward arrived at Maralbeshi and was defeated with 1,000 of the Dungans joining Yakub Beg. Yarkand had decided to submit to Burzug Khan and his great vizier. In September 1865, the second in command and 3,000 men surrendered, converted to Islam, and joined Yakub Beg. The commander refused and blew himself up along with his family; the commanders of Yarkand and Kulja had done the same. An army of rebels from Kokand arrived and joined Yakub. Later in the year, Burzug Khan and Yakub went to Yarkand to deal with a disturbance. The Dungan faction suborned Yakub's Dungans and he was reduced to a few hundred men. Burzug drew off to a separate camp, Yakub defeated the Dungans, Burzug Khan fled to Kashgar and declared Yakub a traitor. The religious leaders supported Yakub, and Burzug was seized in his palace. He was confined for 18 months, exiled to Tibet, and later found his way to Kokand. In little more than a year, Yakub had become master of Kashgar, Yarkand, and Maralbashi, areas stretching roughly from the western end of the Tarim Basin to as far as the Yarkand River.

The Tarim Basin was conquered by Beg, who was viewed as a Khoqandi foreigner and not as a local.

Map of places of Yakub Beg, about 800 miles wide.

=== Later reign ===
The Khan of Kokand had some claim over Barzug Khan as a subject, but did nothing in practice. Yakub entered into relations and signed treaties with the Russian Empire and Great Britain, but failed in trying to get their support against China.

==== Popularity ====
Yakub Beg's rule was unpopular among the natives, with one of the local Kashgaris, a warrior and a chieftain's son, commenting: "During the Chinese rule there was everything; there is nothing now." Trade also declined. Yakub was disliked by his Turkic Muslim subjects, burdening them with heavy taxes and subjecting them to a harsh interpretation of Islamic Sharia law.

Korean historian Kim Hodong points out the fact that his disastrous and inexact commands failed the locals and they, in turn, welcomed the return of Chinese troops. Qing dynasty general Zuo Zongtang wrote that "The Andijanis are tyrannical to their people; government troops should comfort them with benevolence. The Andijanis are greedy in extorting from the people; government troops should rectify this by being generous."

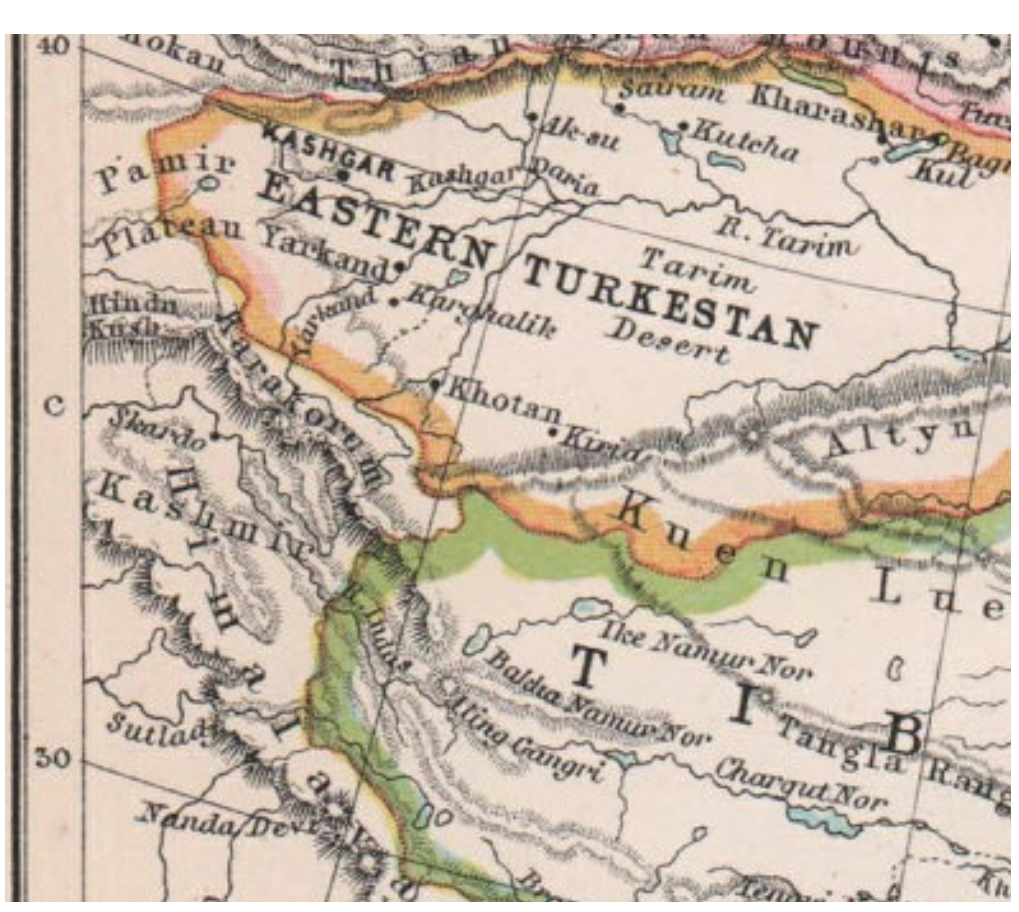
Map titled Chinese Empire & Japan by John Bartholomew & published, in 1893 by John Walker and Co Ltd, London in The Handy Reference Atlas of the World depicting the International Boundary of India with East Turkistan on the Kuen Lun Range & depicting Kukalang & Hindutash Passes, & the Raskam Tract adjoining the Kuen Lun Range in northern Kashmir & the Karakash River in Kashmir as part of India and depicting the provinces of Bengal, Nepal, Assam including the Assam Himalaya, and Kashmir as part of India prior to 1947

== Death ==
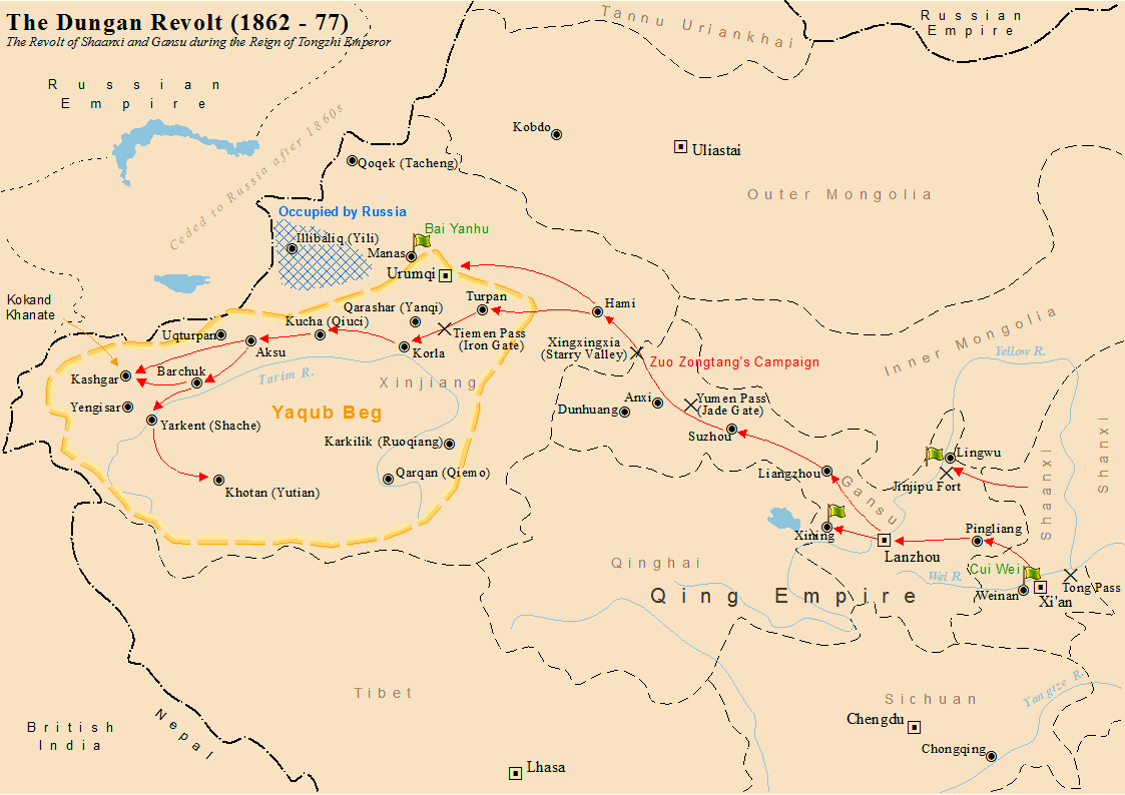
Qing dynasty's campaign against Yakub Beg and his allies

His precise manner of death is unclear. The Times of London and the Russian Turkestan Gazette both reported that he had died after a short illness. Historian Musa Sayrami stated that he was poisoned on 30 May 1877, in Korla by the former hakim (local city ruler) of Yarkand, Niyaz Hakim Beg, as part of a conspiracy with Qing Dynasty forces in Jungaria. However, in a letter to the Qing authorities, Niyaz denied any involvement in the death of Yakub, claiming that the Kashgarian ruler had committed suicide. Other sources also state that he was killed in battle with the Chinese.

While contemporaneous Muslim writers usually explained Yakub Beg's death by poisoning, and the suicide theory was the accepted truth among the Qing generals of the time, modern historians, according to Kim Hodong, think that natural death (of a stroke) is the most plausible explanation. Contemporary Western sources claim that the Chinese had him poisoned or killed via some other subversive act.

The exact date of Yakub's death is uncertain. Although Sayrami claimed that he died on April 28, 1877, modern historians think that this is impossible, as Przewalski met him on May 9. Chinese sources usually give May 22 as the date of his death, while Aleksey Kuropatkin thought it to be May 29. Late May, 1877 is therefore thought to be the most likely time period.

Yaqub and his son Ishana Beg's corpses were "burned to cinders" in public, which angered the population in Kashgar, and Chinese troops had to quell an attempted rebellion by Hakim Khan. Four of his sons and two grandsons were captured by the Chinese; one son was beheaded, one grandson died, and the rest were sentenced to be castrated and enslaved to soldiers. Surviving members of Yaqub's family included his four sons, four grandchildren (two grandsons and two granddaughters) and four wives. They either died in prison in Lanzhou, Gansu, or were killed by the Chinese. His sons Yima Kuli, K'ati Kuli, Maiti Kuli, and grandson Aisan Ahung were the only survivors by 1879; they were all underage children put on trial and sentenced to an agonizing death if they were complicit in their father's rebellious "sedition", or if they were innocent of their father's crimes, were to be sentenced to castration and serving as a eunuch slave to Chinese troops when they became 11 years old. Although some sources assert that the sentence of castration was carried out, official sources from the US State Department and activists involved in the incident state that Yaqub's sons and grandson had their sentences commuted to life imprisonment with a fund provided for their support.

== Legacy ==
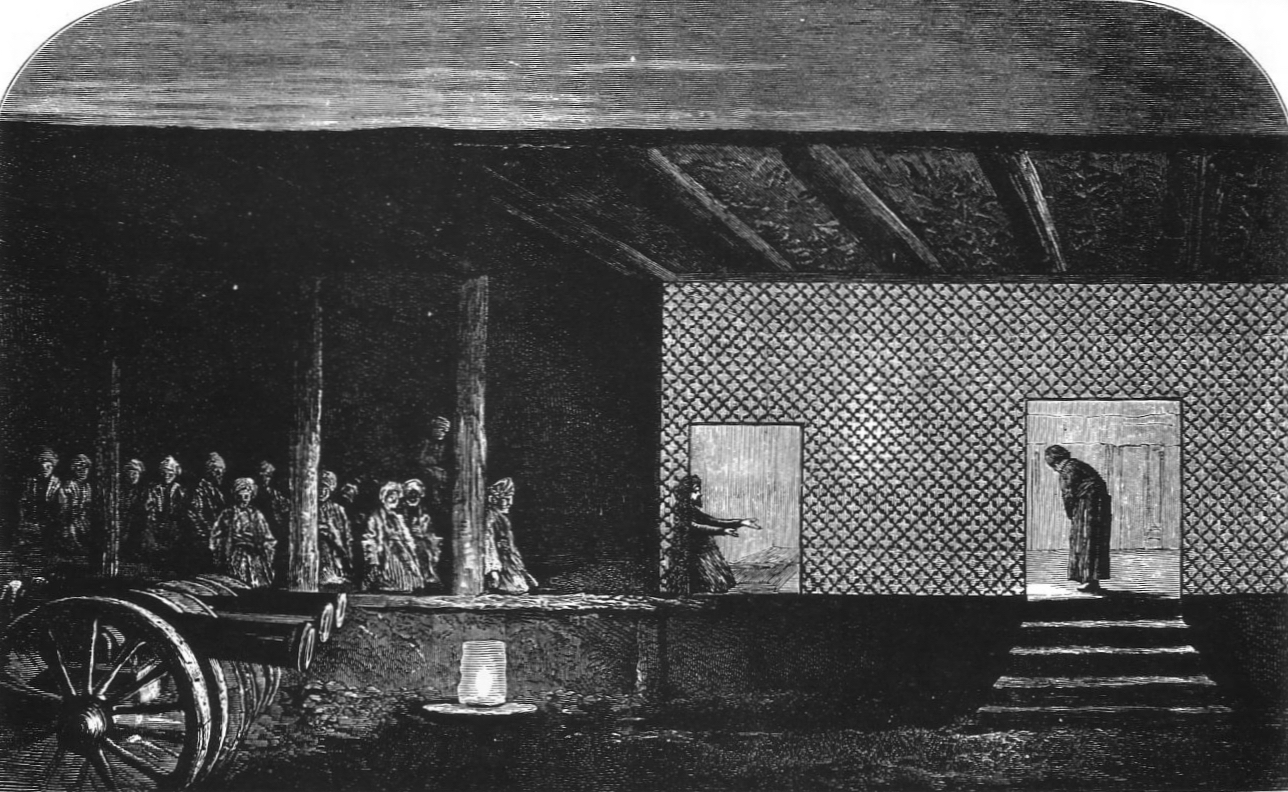
Night interview with Yakub Beg, King of Kashgaria, 1868

Rebiya Kadeer claimed Yakub Beg was a "Uyghur hero".

=== Tributes ===
One source says that his tomb was at Kashgar but was razed by the Chinese in 1878.

A son of general and politician Yulbars Khan was named after Yaqub Beg.

==== In media ====
Poems were written about the victories of Yaqub's forces over the Chinese and the Dungans (Chinese Muslims).

Yaqub makes an appearance in the second half of George Macdonald Fraser's novel Flashman at the Charge.

=== Al Qaeda ===
Al-Qaeda ideologue Mustafa Setmariam Nasar praised Yakub and his establishment of educational institutions for Islam, and mosques called him "Attalik Ghazi" and a "good man" for his war against Buddhists and the Chinese.

The Doğu Türkistan Haber Ajansı (East Turkestan News Agency) published an article from Al-Qaeda branch Al-Nusra Front's English language Al-Risalah magazine (مجلة الرسالة), second issue (العدد الثاني), translated from English into Turkish and titled Al Risale: "Türkistan Dağları" 2. Bölüm (The Message: "Turkistan Mountains" Part 2), which praised the Sharia implemented by Yakub and cited him as an upholder of Jihad, attacking the Qing.

== See also ==
- Xinjiang under Qing rule
- Dungan Revolt (1862–77)
- Qing reconquest of Xinjiang

== In literature ==
- Yakub Beg is a secondary character in the novel Flashman at the Charge, published in 1973.
- Demetrius Charles Boulger, The life of Yakoob Beg; Athalik Ghazi, and Badaulet; Ameer of Kashgar , London: Wm.H. Allen & Co., 1878 (From the Open Library)
- A fictionalization of Yakub Beg's life appears in the novel Tales of Inner Asia by Todd Gibson
