= Qing reconquest of Xinjiang =

Reconquest of Xinjiang by the Qing dynasty after the Dungan revolt (19th century)

- Part of the Dungan Revolt (1862–1877)
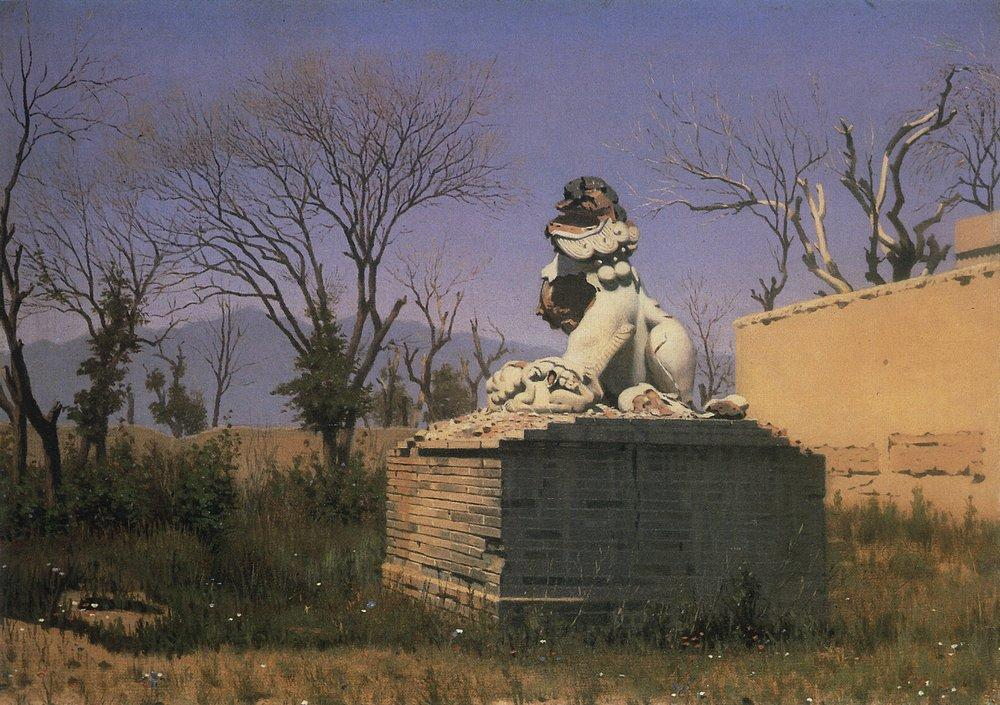
- Ruins in Tacheng in the 1870s
Date	1876–1877
Location	Xinjiang
Result	Qing victory
Territorial changes	Xinjiang returned to the Qing Empire

Belligerents
Qing dynasty	Yettishar (Kokandi Uzbek Andijanis under Yaqub Beg)

Commanders and leaders
Zuo Zongtang; Liu Jintang; Ma Anliang; Cui Wei; Hua Decai	Yaqub Beg †; Bai Yanhu

Units involved
Han Chinese Xiang Army; Khufiyya Sufi Hui Muslims (Dungans) from Gansu; Gedimu Sunni Hui Muslims from Shaanxi	Kokandi Uzbek Andijanis

Qing reconquest of Xinjiang
- Traditional Chinese: 清軍收復新疆
- Simplified Chinese: 清军收复新疆
Transcriptions

General Zuo's reconquest of Xinjiang
- Traditional Chinese: 左宗棠收復新疆
- Simplified Chinese: 左宗棠收复新疆
Transcriptions

The Qing dynasty reconquered Xinjiang after the Dungan Revolt in the late 19th century. After a century of Qing rule, the Uzbek adventurer Yakub Beg conquered almost all of Xinjiang during the revolt, but was eventually defeated by the Qing General Zuo Zongtang (also known as General Tso). Furthermore, the Qing recovered the Gulja region through diplomatic negotiations with the Russian Empire and the Treaty of Saint Petersburg in 1881. Xinjiang was converted into a province in 1884.

== Background ==
The Qing dynasty under the Qianlong Emperor conquered Xinjiang from the Dzungar Khanate during the final stage of the Dzungar–Qing Wars in the late 1750s and put Xinjiang under its rule. However, the Qing dynasty declined in the late 19th century following the Opium War. A major revolt known as the Dungan Revolt occurred in the 1860s and 1870s in Northwest China, and Qing rule almost collapsed in all of Xinjiang except for places such as Tacheng. Taking advantage of this revolt, Yakub Beg, commander-in-chief of the army of Kokand occupied most of Xinjiang and declared himself the Amir of Kashgaria. Yakub Beg ruled at the height of The Great Game era when the British, Russian, and Qing empires were all vying for Central Asia.

== Campaign ==
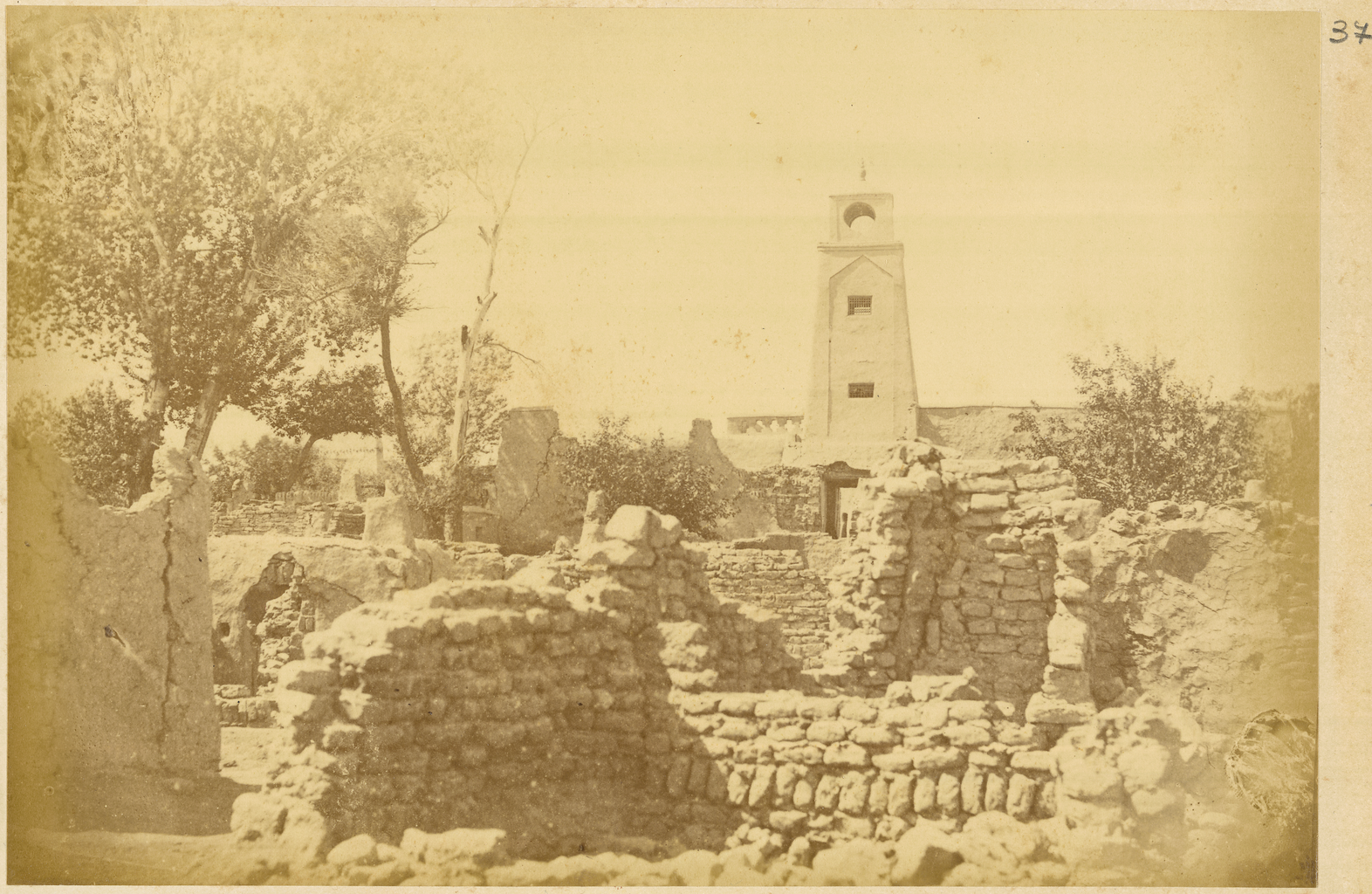
Ruins of a mosque in Hami destroyed by rebels in 1872.

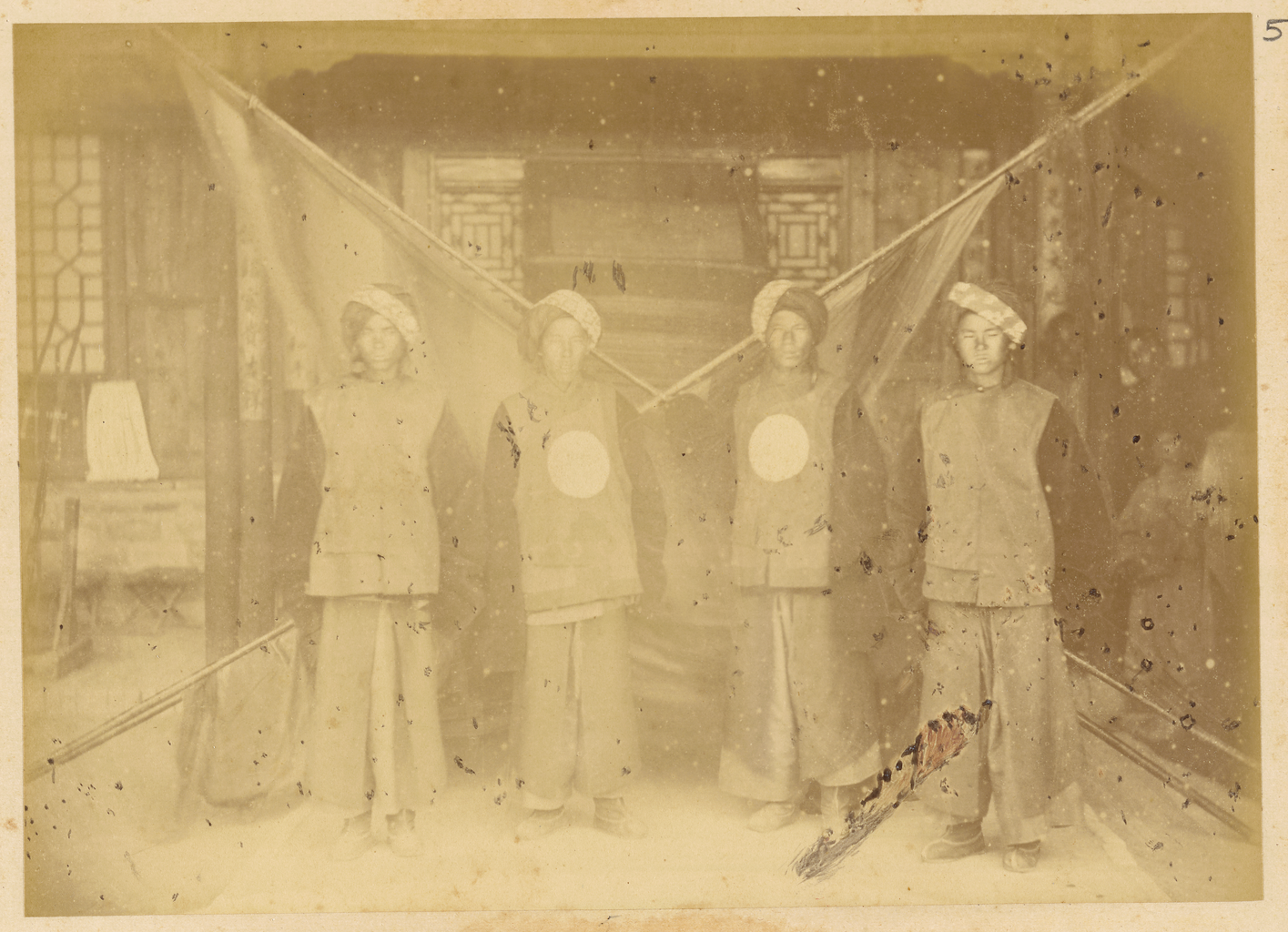
Chinese Soldiers in uniform of wool jackets, velveteen trousers covered with a wrapped skirt, hair wrapped in turbans in Hami, 1875.

In the late 1870s, the Qing decided to reconquer Xinjiang with General Zuo Zongtang as its commander. As Zuo Zongtang moved into Xinjiang to crush the Muslim rebels under Yaqub Beg, he was joined by Dungan Khufiyya Sufi (Hui) General Ma Anliang and his forces, which were composed entirely out of Muslim Dungan people. Ma Anliang and his Dungan troops fought alongside Zuo Zongtang to attack the Muslim rebel forces. In addition, General Dong Fuxiang had an army of both Hans and Dungan people, and his army took Kashgaria and Khotan area during the reconquest. Also, the Shaanxi Gedimu Hui Muslim (Dungan) Generals Cui Wei and Hua Decai, who had defected back to the Qing, joined Zuo Zongtang and led the attack on Yaqub Beg's forces in Xinjiang.

General Zuo implemented a conciliatory policy toward the Muslim rebels, pardoning those who did not rebel and those who surrendered if they had joined in only for religious reasons. If rebels assisted the government against the rebel Muslims they received rewards. In contrast to General Zuo, the Manchu leader Dorongga sought to massacre all the Muslims and saw them all as the enemy. Zuo also instructed General Zhang Yao that "The Andijanis are tyrannical to their people; government troops should comfort them with benevolence. The Andijanis are greedy in extorting from the people; the government troops should rectify this by being generous", telling him to not mistreat the Turkic Muslim natives of Xinjiang. Zuo wrote that the main targets were only the "die-hard partisans" and their leaders, Yaqub Beg and Bai Yanhu. The natives were not blamed or mistreated by the Qing troops, a Russian wrote that soldiers under General Liu "acted very judiciously with regard to the prisoners whom he took . . . His treatment of these men was calculated to have a good influence in favour of the Chinese."

Zuo Zongtang, previously a general in the Xiang Army, was the commander in chief of all Qing troops participating in this counterinsurgency. His subordinates were the Han Chinese General Liu Jintang and Manchu Jin Shun. Liu Jintang's army had modern German artillery, which Jin Shun's forces lacked and neither was Jin's advance as rapid as Liu's. After Liu bombarded Ku-mu-ti, Muslim rebel casualties numbered 6,000 dead while Bai Yanhu was forced to flee for his life. Thereafter Qing forces entered Ürümqi unopposed. Zuo Zongtang wrote that Yaqub Beg's soldiers had modern western weapons but were cowardly: "The Andijani chieftain Yaqub Beg has fairly good firearms. He has foreign rifles and foreign guns, including cannon using explosive shells [Kai Hua Pao]; but his are not as good nor as effective as those in the possession of our government forces. His men are not good marksmen, and when repulsed they simply ran away."

=== Timeline ===
Places for Yakub Beg

Phase 1: 1876: From about 1874, with the end of the Panthay rebellion and most of the Dungan Revolt (1862–1877), the Qing were able to turn their attention to Yakub Beg in the far west. In 1875 Zuo Zongtang was given responsibility. It took a long time to collect men and supplies and move them 800 miles west along the Gansu corridor. In August 1876, the Qing appeared at Urumchi. The place soon surrendered and the garrison was massacred. On 2 September they began the siege of Manas which was a much stronger place. On 6 November it surrendered. The garrison left town in marching order with their weapons. It appeared that they might be planning an armed break-out, so they were attacked and slaughtered. Every able-bodied man in the vicinity was also killed, but the women and children were spared. A headquarters was established at Gucheng about 100 miles east of Urumchi (?). They had about 50,000 men at Gucheng and another 10,000 under Chang Yao at Hami. The Qing army had now been trained by French and German officers, had Krupp cannon, at least 10,000 Berdan rifles and were supplied, unofficially, by Russian merchants from Kulja. In September Russia annexed the Khanate of Kokand northwest of Kashgar, thereby tightening the noose around Yakub Beg.

Phase 2: 1877, spring: In September 1876 Yakub learned that a Qing army was 700 miles to the east. He spent the winter making preparations and by February 1877 he was at Turfan building forts. Aleksey Kuropatkin visited Yakub at Turfan and reported that he had 17000 troops spread over a large area, that there were many desertions and that Yakub had little hope. In the spring, the Qing attacked the fort of 'Davanchi' (probably Dabancheng on the road from Urumchi to Turfan). Meanwhile, in mid-April Chang Yao marched from Hami and took Pichuan 50 miles east of Turfan. Yakub fought near Turfan and lost, withdrew to Toksun, was defeated, withdrew to Karashar, stayed there a few days and moved to Korla. This withdrawal demoralized the troops and there were many desertions. In April or May Yakub met Nikolay Przhevalsky near Korla. In May 1877, Yakub Beg died near Korla, possibly murdered.

Phase 3: 1877, autumn: The Qing halted near Turfan for a few months, possibly to bring up supplies or avoid the summer heat. The death of Yakub Beg had disorganized the rebels. There were various conflicts which need not be listed and no single leader arose to organize resistance. In August an advance party left Turfan and the main body left on 27 September. In early October Karashar and Korla were occupied. The rebels dammed the Kaidu River and flooded part of Karashar, but this did not stop the advance. Bayen Hu adopted a scorched earth policy, burning houses and crops and driving the people westward with his army. Kin Shun (Jin Shun) made a forced march and somewhere near Luntai sighted a mob, said to be some tens of thousands of people. The rebel soldiers drew off from the civilians, a battle was fought and the Kashgaris fled to Kucha. When the Qing reached Kucha they found the townspeople fighting the rebels, having no wish to accompany them westward. The Kashgaris fought the Qing with some success, were defeated and fled, leaving 1000 dead on the battlefield. A depot was set up at Kucha and some effort was made to clean up the mess left by Bayan Hu. By the end of October Chang Yao brought up the rear guard and the advance was resumed toward Aksu. During this time, General Zuo with the main army had been inactive north of the mountains. He somehow crossed the Tien Shan and joined the advance. The Qing now had so many men and the rebels had been defeated so many times that Aksu and Uqturpan surrendered without a fight. (The commander of Aksu abandoned his post, was captured by the rebels, and executed.) On 17 December, Kashgar was easily taken. Yarkand, Khotan and other places then submitted.

== Aftermath ==
=== Xinjiang incorporated as a province ===
No further rebellion was encountered afterwards, and the reestablished Qing authorities began the task of recovery and reorganization. The Qing forces beheaded Turkic rebel commanders, and also tortured Ottoman Turkish military officers who served with the rebels. When the city of Kashgaria fell, the greater portion of the army, knowing that they could expect no mercy at the hands of Qing authorities, fled to Russian territory, and then spread reports of fresh Chinese massacres, which probably only existed in their own imagination.

Qing forces captured the grandchildren and sons of Yaqub Beg after his death. Aisan Ahung was among his grandson, while the sons who were captured were K'ati Kuli, Yima Kuli, and Maiti Kuli. Yakuub Beg's 4 wives, 2 granddaughters, 2 grandsons and 4 sons fell into Qing hands. 5 year old Aisan Ahung, six year old K'ati Kuli, 10 year old Yima Kuli, and 14 year old Maiti Kuli were sent to Lanzhou jail. A disinterment of the graves and incineration of Ishana Beg's and his father Yaqub's Beg's corpses took place at the orders of the Qing. The Qing crushed an attempted revolt by Hakim Khan Tufl. Beijing received Yaqub Beg's cremated remains.

Zuo Zongtang proposed establishing Xinjiang as a formal province, and this recommendation led to the creation of the Xinjiang Province in November 1884.

=== Management of local Muslim affairs ===
The use of Muslims in the Qing armies against the revolt was noted by Yang Zengxin.

The third reason is that at the time that Turkic Muslims were waging rebellion in the early years of the Guangxu reign, the ‘five elite divisions’ that governor general Liu Jintang led out of the Pass were all Dungan troops [Hui dui 回隊]. Back then, Dungan military commanders such as Cui Wei and Hua Dacai were surrendered troops who had been redeployed. These are undoubtedly cases of pawns who went on to achieve great merit. When Cen Shuying was in charge of military affairs in Yunnan, the Muslim troops and generals that he used included many rebels, and it was because of them that the Muslim rebellion in Yunnan was pacified. These are examples to show that Muslim troops can be used effectively even while Muslim uprisings are still in progress. What is more, since the establishment of the Republic, Dungan have demonstrated not the slightest hint of errant behaviour to suggest that they may prove to be unreliable.

Xiang Army and other Han Chinese male soldiers and sojourners bought Turki Musulman (Uyghur) girls as wives from their parents after Zuo Zongtang's reconquest of Xinjiang, and the Han and Uyghurs often relied on Hui intermediaries to translate and broker the marriages. A Han Chinese man with the surname Li bought a young Uyghur men from two Uyghur men who kidnapped her in 1880. They were employed by the magistrate of Pichan. A Turpan Uyghur girl named Ruo-zang-le who was 12 was sold for 30 taels in 1889 in Qitai to a young Han Chinese Shanxi man named Liu Yun. She became pregnant with his child in 1892. Han Chinese men viewed the toyluq they paid in silver for their Uyghur brides as a bride price. Uyghur Muslim women married Han Chinese men in Xinjiang in the late 19th and early 20th centuries. Han Chinese men, Hindu men, Armenian men, Jewish men and Russian men were married by Uyghur Muslim women who could not find husbands.

== Local reaction ==
Yaqub Beg's rule was unpopular among the natives with one of the local Kashgaris, a warrior and a chieftain's son, commenting: "During the Chinese rule there was everything; there is nothing now." There was also a falling-off in trade.

The local Uyghurs of Altishahr came to view Yaqub Beg as a Kokandi foreigner and his Kokandi associates behaved ruthlessly to the local Uyghurs, an anti Yaqub Beg poem was written by the Uyghur:

From Peking the Chinese came, like stars in the heaven.
The Andijanis rose and fled, like pigs in the forest.
They came in vain and left in vain, the Andijanis!
They went away scared and languidly, the Andijanis!
Every day they took a virgin, and
They went hunting for beauties.
They played with the dancing boys,
Which the Holy Law has forbidden.

== British reaction ==
Demetrius Charles Boulger stated at the time that the strength of the Qing has been thoroughly demonstrated and that her prestige remained unsullied.

== See also ==
- Ten Great Campaigns
- Dzungar–Qing Wars
- Xinjiang under Qing rule
- Dungan Revolt (1862–1877)
