= Kim Ho-dong =

South Korean historian (born 1954)

- Hangul: 김호동
- Hanja: 金浩東
- RR: Gim Hodong
- MR: Kim Hodong

Kim Ho-dong (Korean: 김호동; born 1954; often written in English-language literature as Hodong Kim or Ho-dong Kim) is a Korean historian, professor emeritus at Seoul National University and member of The National Academy of Sciences, Republic of Korea. His research interests include nomadic societies of Central Asia and their interaction with the Chinese state, as well as the history of the Mongol Empire. Drawing on sources in various languages, he writes the history of nomadic peoples from their own perspectives. In the field of Mongol Empire studies, he is regarded as one of the leading scholars who have sought to overcome the traditional fragmentationist approach and examine the Mongol Empire as a whole through a holistic approach.

== Life ==
Kim Ho-dong was born on 20 November 1954. He graduated from Seoul National University with a B.A. in Asian History and studied with Min Tuki. He earned his doctoral degree in Inner Asian and Altaic Studies from Harvard University, where he was a student of Joseph Fletcher, Jr. Omeljan Pritsak, Philip A. Kuhn, and Thomas Barfield were on his dissertation committee as well.

He served as a full professor in the Department of Asian History at Seoul National University from 26 November 1986 until his retirement on 29 February 2020. In recognition of his scholarly contributions, he was appointed as a distinguished (emeritus) professor at Seoul National University on 1 March 2018. He also served as the president of the Korean Association for Central Asian Studies from 2003 to 2006.

He held visiting appointments and research fellowships at LMU Munich (Alexander von Humboldt Foundation, 1994), Harvard University (Harvard-Yenching Institute, 2000–2001), the Swedish Collegium for Advanced Study (2007–2008), and the Institute for Advanced Study in Princeton (2015–2016).

Currently, he is a member of The National Academy of Sciences, Republic of Korea within the Humanities and Social Sciences Division.

== Works ==
Kim’s doctoral dissertation examined the Muslim uprising against Qing rule that broke out in Xinjiang in 1864. It was first published in Korean in 1999 and later in English as Holy War in China: The Muslim Rebellion and State in Chinese Central Asia, 1864–1877 (2004). In this book, Kim challenges the conventional view that the Xinjiang Muslim rebellion was inevitably crushed by the Qing army because of Qing military superiority or the inherent weakness of the Muslim forces. Instead, he argues that the outcome of the conflict was far from predetermined and that the rebels’ defeat resulted primarily from the political miscalculations of their leader, Yaqub Beg.

Afterward, Kim expanded his research beyond nineteenth-century Xinjiang to earlier periods of Central Eurasian history. His studies during this period, published primarily in Korean, covered a broad chronological range from the Tang dynasty's Jimi (loose-rein) system to the Moghul Khanate period, addressing various topics including nomadic sovereignty and the Muslim cult of saints. Around the turn of the twenty-first century, his research increasingly focused on the history of the Mongol Empire, on which he has continued to publish numerous articles.

Kim’s scholarship is characterized by a broad perspective on the Mongol Empire based on the use of sources written in multiple languages. In particular, his expertise in Classical Chinese and Persian, two of the most important languages for the study of Mongol history, has enabled him to move beyond the traditional division of the field into separate studies of the Ilkhanate and the Yuan dynasty. His work has contributed to the recent trend of emphasizing the unity and interconnectedness of the Mongol Empire. His article “The Unity of the Mongol Empire and Continental Exchanges over Eurasia” well represents this approach.

Kim also emphasizes the Mongol perspective in his studies, challenging earlier approaches to Yuan history that relied primarily on Chinese-language sources. By incorporating sources in other languages, he seeks to restore the Mongol perspective in the study of the Yuan dynasty. This approach is exemplified in his articles “Qubilai’s Commanders (Amīrs): A Mongol Perspective” and “Was ‘Da Yuan’ a Chinese Dynasty?” In the former, he argues that political power under Qubilai Khan was largely held by Mongols and that the role of Han Chinese in the political and military affairs of the Mongol Empire was limited, while in the latter he argues that Da Yuan referred not to a Chinese-centered dynasty but to the Mongol Empire (Yeke Mongγol Ulus) itself.

Kim co-edited The Cambridge History of the Mongol Empire (2024) with Michal Biran, a work that brings together recent scholarship on the history of the Mongol Empire. He has also actively contributed to the translation and annotation of historical sources into Korean, most notably through his complete Korean translation of Rashid al-Din’s Jāmiʿ al-Tawārīkh (Compendium of Chronicles).

== Selected publications in English ==
- “Iranian Groups in Sinkiang since the 1750s” (1991), in Encyclopaedia Iranica, vol. 5, fasc. 5. Leiden: E. J. Brill
- “The Cult of Saints in Eastern Turkestan: The Case of Alp Ata in Turfan” (1991), Proceedings of the 35th Permanent International Altaistic Conference, pp. 199–226
- “Muslim Saints in the 14th to the 16th Centuries of Eastern Turkestan” (1996), International Journal of Central Asian Studies, vol. 1, pp. 285–322
- “The Study of Inner Asian History in Korea: From 1945 to the Present” (1998), Asian Research Trends, vol. 8, pp. 1–19
- “The Early History of the Moghul Nomads: The Legacy of the Chaghatai Khanate” (1999), in The Mongol Empire and Its Legacy, edited by Reuven Amitai and David O. Morgan, Leiden: E. J. Brill, pp. 290–318
- Holy War in China: The Muslim Rebellion and State in Chinese Central Asia, 1864–1877 (2004). Stanford: Stanford University Press
- “A Reappraisal of Güyüg Khan” (2005), in Mongols, Turks, and Others, edited by Reuven Amitai and Michal Biran, Leiden: E. J. Brill, pp. 309–398
- “The Unity of the Mongol Empire and Continental Exchanges over Eurasia” (2010), Journal of Central Eurasian Studies, vol. 1, pp. 15–42
- “Eastern Turki Royal Decrees of the 17th Century in the Jarring Collection” (2010), in Studies on Xinjiang Historical Sources in 17–20th Centuries, edited by James A. Millward, Y. Shinmen, and J. Sugawara, pp. 59–119
- “A Re-Examination of the ‘Register of Thousands (Hazāra)’ in the Jāmiʿ al-Tawārīkh” (2013), in Rashīd al-Dīn: Agent and Mediator of Cultural Exchanges in Ilkhanid Iran, edited by Anna Akasoy, Charles Burnett, and Ronit Yoeli-Tlalim, London: The Warburg Institute, pp. 89–114
- “Qubilai’s Commanders (Amīrs): A Mongol Perspective” (2014), Archivum Eurasiae Medii Aevi, vol. 21, pp. 147–160
- “Was ‘Da Yuan’ a Chinese Dynasty?” (2015), Journal of Song and Yuan Studies, vol. 45, pp. 279–305
- “Mongol Perceptions of ‘China’ and the Yuan Dynasty” (2018), in Sacred Mandates: Asian International Relations since Chinggis Khan, edited by Timothy Brook, Michael van Walt van Praag, and M. Bletjes, Chicago: University of Chicago Press, pp. 45–48
- “Formation and Changes of Uluses in the Mongol Empire” (2019), Journal of the Economic and Social History of the Orient, vol. 62, nos. 2–3, pp. 269–317
- “‛Īsa Kelemechi: A Translator Turned Envoy between Asia and Europe” (2020), in Along the Silk Roads in Mongol Eurasia, Berkeley: University of California Press, pp. 255–269
- The Cambridge History of the Mongol Empire (2 vols., 2024), edited by Michal Biran and Ho-dong Kim. Cambridge: Cambridge University Press
- “‘Rex Corum’ and the Archbishop of Khanbaliq in the Letter of Pope John XXII (1333)” (2024), Mamlūk Studies Review, vol. 27, pp. 91–107
